= List of mosses of Great Britain and Ireland =

A list of the mosses of Britain and Ireland.

== List ==
- Abietinella abietina – fir tamarisk-moss
- Acaulon muticum – rounded pygmy-moss
- Acaulon triquetrum – triangular pygmy-moss
- Alleniella complanata – flat Neckera
- Aloina aloides – common aloe-moss
- Aloina ambigua – tall aloe-moss
- Aloina brevirostris – short-beaked aloe-moss
- Aloina rigida – rigid aloe-moss
- Amblyodon dealbatus – short-tooth hump-moss
- Amblystegium confervoides – tiny feather-moss
- Amblystegium humile – constricted feather-moss
- Amblystegium radicale – swamp feather-moss
- Amblystegium serpens – creeping feather-moss
- Amphidium lapponicum – Lapland yoke-moss
- Amphidium mougeotii – Mougeot's yoke-moss
- Andreaea alpestris – slender rock-moss
- Andreaea blyttii – Blytt's rock-moss
- Andreaea frigida – icy rock-moss
- Andreaea megistospora – big-spored rock-moss
- Andreaea mutabilis – changeable rock-moss
- Andreaea nivalis – snow rock-moss
- Andreaea rothii – dusky rock-moss
- Andreaea rupestris – black rock-moss
- Andreaea sinuosa – small-spored rock-moss
- Anoectangium aestivum – summer-moss
- Anomobryum julaceum – slender silver-moss
- Anomodon longifolius – long-leaved tail-moss
- Anomodon viticulosus – rambling tail-moss
- Antitrichia curtipendula – pendulous wing-moss
- Aongstroemia longipes – sprig-moss
- Aplodon wormskjoldii – carrion-moss
- Archidium alternifolium – clay earth-moss
- Arctoa blyttii – Blytt's fork-moss
- Arctoa fulvella – Arctic fork-moss
- Atrichum angustatum – lesser smoothcap
- Atrichum crispum – fountain smoothcap
- Atrichum tenellum – slender smoothcap
- Atrichum undulatum – common smoothcap
- Aulacomnium androgynum – bud-headed groove-moss
- Aulacomnium palustre – bog groove-moss
- Aulacomnium turgidum – mountain groove-moss
- Barbula convoluta – lesser bird's-claw beard-moss
- Barbula unguiculata – bird's-claw beard-moss
- Bartramia halleriana – Haller's apple-moss
- Bartramia ithyphylla – straight-leaved apple-moss
- Bartramia pomiformis – common apple-moss
- Bartramia stricta – upright apple-moss
- Blindia acuta – sharp-leaved blindia
- Blindia caespiticia – dwarf blindia
- Brachydontium trichodes – bristle-leaf
- Brachythecium albicans – whitish feather-moss
- Brachythecium appleyardiae – Appleyard's feather-moss
- Brachythecium erythrorrhizon – redfoot feather-moss
- Brachythecium glaciale – snow feather-moss
- Brachythecium glareosum – streaky feather-moss
- Brachythecium mildeanum – sand feather-moss
- Brachythecium plumosum – rusty feather-moss
- Brachythecium populeum – matted feather-moss
- Brachythecium reflexum – reflexed feather-moss
- Brachythecium rivulare – river feather-moss
- Brachythecium rutabulum – rough-stalked feather-moss
- Brachythecium salebrosum – smooth-stalk feather-moss
- Brachythecium starkei – Starke's feather-moss
- Brachythecium trachypodium – Lawers feather-moss
- Brachythecium velutinum – velvet feather-moss
- Breutelia chrysocoma – golden-head moss
- Bryoerythrophyllum caledonicum – Scottish beard-moss
- Bryoerythrophyllum ferruginascens – rufous beard-moss
- Bryoerythrophyllum recurvirostrum – red beard-moss
- Bryum alpinum – alpine thread-moss
- Bryum argenteum – silver-moss
- Bryum dixonii – Dixon's thread-moss
- Bryum gemmiparum – Welsh thread-moss
- Bryum imbricatum – small-mouthed thread-moss
- Bryum radiculosum – wall thread-moss
- Bryum riparium – river thread-moss
- Buxbaumia aphylla – brown shield-moss
- Buxbaumia viridis – green shield-moss
- Callicladium imponens – pellucid plait-moss
- Calliergon cordifolium – heart-leaved spear-moss
- Calliergon giganteum – giant spear-moss
- Calliergonella cuspidata – pointed spear-moss
- Calliergonella lindbergii – lindberg's plait-moss
- Calyptrochaeta apiculata – southern Hookeria
- Campyliadelphus chrysophyllus – golden feather-moss
- Campyliadelphus elodes – fine-leaved marsh feather-moss
- Campylium protensum – dull starry feather-moss
- Campylium stellatum – yellow starry feather-moss
- Campylophyllum calcareum – chalk feather-moss
- Campylophyllum halleri – haller's feather-moss
- Campylopus atrovirens – bristly swan-neck moss
- Campylopus brevipilus – compact swan-neck moss
- Campylopus flexuosus – rusty swan-neck moss
- Campylopus fragilis – brittle swan-neck moss
- Campylopus gracilis – Schwarz's swan-neck moss
- Campylopus introflexus – heath star moss
- Campylopus pilifer – stiff swan-neck moss
- Campylopus pyriformis – dwarf swan-neck moss
- Campylopus schimperi – Schimper's swan-neck moss
- Campylopus setifolius – silky swan-neck moss
- Campylopus shawii – Shaw's swan-neck moss
- Campylopus subporodictyon – rusty bow-moss
- Campylopus subulatus – awl-leaved swan-neck moss
- Campylostelium saxicola – bent-moss
- Catoscopium nigritum – down-looking moss
- Ceratodon conicus – scarce redshank
- Ceratodon purpureus – redshank
- Cheilothela chloropus – rabbit moss
- Cinclidium stygium – lurid cupola-moss
- Cinclidotus fontinaloides – smaller lattice-moss
- Cinclidotus riparius – fountain lattice-moss
- Cirriphyllum cirrosum – tendril feather-moss
- Cirriphyllum crassinervium – beech feather-moss
- Cirriphyllum piliferum – hair-pointed feather-moss
- Climacium dendroides – tree-moss
- Conardia compacta – compact feather-moss
- Conostomum tetragonum – helmet-moss
- Coscinodon cribrosus – sieve-tooth moss
- Cratoneuron curvicaule – bent-stem hook-moss
- Cratoneuron filicinum – fern-leaved hook-moss
- Cryphaea heteromalla – lateral cryphaea
- Ctenidium molluscum – chalk comb-moss
- Ctenidium procerrimum – alpine comb-moss
- Cyclodictyon laetevirens – bright-green cave-moss
- Cynodontium fallax – false dog-tooth
- Cynodontium jenneri – Jenner's dog-tooth
- Cynodontium polycarpon – many-fruited dog-tooth
- Cynodontium strumiferum – strumose dog-tooth
- Cynodontium tenellum – delicate dog-tooth
- Daltonia splachnoides – Irish Daltonia
- Dendrocryphaea lamyana – multi-fruited cryphaea
- Dialytrichia mucronata – pointed lattice-moss
- Dichodontium flavescens – yellowish fork-moss
- Dichodontium palustre – marsh forklet-moss
- Dichodontium pellucidum – transparent fork-moss
- Dicranella cerviculata – red-neck forklet-moss
- Dicranella crispa – curl-leaved forklet-moss
- Dicranella grevilleana – Greville's forklet-moss
- Dicranella heteromalla – silky forklet-moss
- Dicranella rufescens – rufous forklet-moss
- Dicranella schreberiana – Schreber's forklet-moss
- Dicranella staphylina – field forklet-moss
- Dicranella subulata – awl-leaved forklet-moss
- Dicranella varia – variable forklet-moss
- Dicranodontium asperulum – orange bow-moss
- Dicranodontium denudatum – beaked bow-moss
- Dicranodontium uncinatum – curve-leaved bow-moss
- Dicranoweisia cirrata – common pincushion
- Dicranoweisia crispula – mountain pincushion
- Dicranum bergeri – waved fork-moss
- Dicranum bonjeanii – crisped fork-moss
- Dicranum elongatum – dense fork-moss
- Dicranum flagellare – whip fork-moss
- Dicranum flexicaule – bendy fork-moss
- Dicranum fuscescens – dusky fork-moss
- Dicranum leioneuron – fuzzy fork-moss
- Dicranum majus – greater fork-moss
- Dicranum montanum – mountain fork-moss
- Dicranum polysetum – rugose fork-moss
- Dicranum scoparium – broom fork-moss
- Dicranum scottianum – Scott's fork-moss
- Dicranum spurium – rusty fork-moss
- Dicranum tauricum – fragile fork-moss
- Didymodon acutus – pointed beard-moss
- Didymodon australasiae – shady beard-moss
- Didymodon cordatus – cordate beard-moss
- Didymodon fallax – fallacious beard-moss
- Didymodon ferrugineus – rusty beard-moss
- Didymodon glaucus – glaucous beard-moss
- Didymodon icmadophilus – slender beard-moss
- Didymodon insulanus – cylindric beard-moss
- Didymodon luridus – dusky beard-moss
- Didymodon mamillosus – Perthshire beard-moss
- Didymodon maximus – Irish beard-moss
- Didymodon nicholsonii – Nicholson's beard-moss
- Didymodon rigidulus – rigid beard-moss
- Didymodon sinuosus – wavy beard-moss
- Didymodon spadiceus – brown beard-moss
- Didymodon tomaculosus – sausage beard-moss
- Didymodon tophaceus – olive beard-moss
- Didymodon vinealis – soft-tufted beard-moss
- Diphyscium foliosum – nut-moss
- Discelium nudum – flag-moss
- Distichium capillaceum – fine Distichium
- Distichium inclinatum – inclined Distichium
- Ditrichum cornubicum – Cornish path-moss
- Ditrichum flexicaule – bendy ditrichum
- Ditrichum gracile – slender ditrichum
- Ditrichum heteromallum – curve-leaved ditrichum
- Ditrichum lineare – dark ditrichum
- Ditrichum plumbicola – lead-moss
- Ditrichum pusillum – brown ditrichum
- Ditrichum subulatum – awl-leaved ditrichum
- Ditrichum zonatum – alpine ditrichum
- Drepanocladus aduncus – Kneiff's hook-moss
- Drepanocladus lycopodioides – large hook-moss
- Drepanocladus polygamus – fertile feather-moss
- Drepanocladus sendtneri – chalk hook-moss
- Drepanocladus trifarius – three-ranked spear-moss
- Encalypta alpina – alpine extinguisher-moss
- Encalypta brevicollis – white-mouthed extinguisher-moss
- Encalypta ciliata – fringed extinguisher-moss
- Encalypta rhaptocarpa – ribbed extinguisher-moss
- Encalypta streptocarpa – spiral extinguisher-moss
- Encalypta vulgaris – common extinguisher-moss
- Entodon concinnus – Montagne's cylinder-moss
- Entosthodon attenuatus – thin cord-moss
- Entosthodon fascicularis – Hasselquist's hyssop
- Entosthodon muhlenbergii – Muhlenberg's cord-moss
- Entosthodon obtusus – blunt cord-moss
- Entosthodon pulchellus – pretty cord-moss
- Ephemerum cohaerens – clustered earth-moss
- Ephemerum minutissimum – minute earth-moss
- Ephemerum recurvifolium – strap-leaved earth-moss
- Ephemerum serratum – serrated earth-moss
- Ephemerum sessile – sessile earth-moss
- Ephemerum stellatum – starry earth-moss
- Epipterygium tozeri – Tozer's thread-moss
- Eucladium verticillatum – whorled tufa-moss
- Eurhynchium meridionale – Portland feather-moss
- Eurhynchium pulchellum – elegant feather-moss
- Eurhynchium striatulum – lesser striated feather-moss
- Eurhynchium striatum – common striated feather-moss
- Fissidens adianthoides – maidenhair pocket-moss
- Fissidens bryoides – lesser pocket-moss
- Fissidens celticus – Welsh pocket-moss
- Fissidens crassipes – fatfoot pocket-moss
- Fissidens curnovii – Curnow's pocket-moss
- Fissidens curvatus – Portuguese pocket-moss
- Fissidens dubius – rock pocket-moss
- Fissidens exiguus – tiny pocket-moss
- Fissidens exilis – slender pocket-moss
- Fissidens gracilifolius – narrow-leaved pocket-moss
- Fissidens incurvus – short-leaved pocket-moss
- Fissidens limbatus – Herzog's pocket-moss
- Fissidens monguillonii – Atlantic pocket-moss
- Fissidens osmundoides – purple-stalked pocket-moss
- Fissidens polyphyllus – many-leaved pocket-moss
- Fissidens pusillus – petty pocket-moss
- Fissidens rivularis – river pocket-moss
- Fissidens rufulus – beck pocket-moss
- Fissidens serrulatus – large Atlantic pocket-moss
- Fissidens taxifolius – common pocket-moss
- Fissidens viridulus – green pocket-moss
- Fontinalis antipyretica – greater water-moss
- Fontinalis squamosa – alpine water-moss
- Funaria hygrometrica – common cord-moss
- Gemmabryum dichotomum – bicoloured Bryum
- Gemmabryum gemmiferum – small-bud Bryum
- Gemmabryum gemmilucens – yellow-bud Bryum
- Gemmabryum klinggraeffii – raspberry Bryum
- Gemmabryum ruderale – pea Bryum
- Gemmabryum sauteri – Sauter's thread-moss
- Gemmabryum violaceum – pill Bryum
- Glyphomitrium daviesii – black-tufted moss
- Grimmia anodon – toothless Grimmia
- Grimmia arenaria – sand Grimmia
- Grimmia atrata – copper Grimmia
- Grimmia crinita – hedgehog Grimmia
- Grimmia decipiens – great Grimmia
- Grimmia donniana – Donn's Grimmia
- Grimmia elatior – large Grimmia
- Grimmia elongata – brown Grimmia
- Grimmia funalis – string Grimmia
- Grimmia hartmanii – hartman's Grimmia
- Grimmia incurva – black Grimmia
- Grimmia laevigata – hoary Grimmia
- Grimmia longirostris – north Grimmia
- Grimmia montana – sun Grimmia
- Grimmia orbicularis – round-fruited Grimmia
- Grimmia ovalis – flat-rock Grimmia
- Grimmia pulvinata – grey-cushioned Grimmia
- Grimmia ramondii – spreading-leaved Grimmia
- Grimmia tergestina – dapple-mouthed Grimmia
- Grimmia torquata – twisted Grimmia
- Grimmia trichophylla – hair-pointed Grimmia
- Grimmia ungeri – alpine Grimmia
- Grimmia unicolor – dingy Grimmia
- Gymnostomum aeruginosum – verdigris tufa-moss
- Gymnostomum calcareum – blunt-leaf tufa-moss
- Gymnostomum viridulum – Luisier's tufa-moss
- Gyroweisia reflexa – reflexed beardless-moss
- Gyroweisia tenuis – slender stubble-moss
- Habrodon perpusillus – lesser squirrel-tail moss
- Hamatocaulis vernicosus – varnished hook-moss
- Hedwigia ciliata – fringed hoar-moss
- Hedwigia integrifolia – green hoar-moss
- Hedwigia stellata – starry hoar-moss
- Helodium blandowii – Blandow's tamarisk-moss
- Hennediella heimii – Heim's Pottia
- Hennediella macrophylla – short Pottia
- Hennediella stanfordensis – Stanford screw-moss
- Herzogiella seligeri – Silesian feather-moss
- Herzogiella striatella – Muhlenbeck's feather-moss
- Heterocladium dimorphum – dimorphous tamarisk-moss
- Heterocladium heteropterum – wry-leaved tamarisk-moss
- Heterocladium wulfsbergii – wulfsberg's tamarisk-moss
- Homalia trichomanoides – blunt feather-moss
- Homalothecium lutescens – yellow feather-moss
- Homalothecium sericeum – silky wall feather-moss
- Homomallium incurvatum – incurved feather-moss
- Hookeria lucens – shining Hookeria
- Hygroamblystegium fluviatile – brook-side feather-moss
- Hygroamblystegium tenax – fountain feather-moss
- Hygroamblystegium varium – willow feather-moss
- Hygrohypnum duriusculum – broad-leaved brook-moss
- Hygrohypnum eugyrium – western brook-moss
- Hygrohypnum luridum – drab brook-moss
- Hygrohypnum ochraceum – claw brook-moss
- Hygrohypnum polare – polar brook-moss
- Hygrohypnum smithii – Arctic brook-moss
- Hygrohypnum styriacum – snow brook-moss
- Hylocomiastrum pyrenaicum – Oake's wood-moss
- Hylocomiastrum umbratum – shaded wood-moss
- Hylocomium splendens – glittering wood-moss
- Hymenostylium insigne – robust tufa-moss
- Hymenostylium recurvirostrum – hook-beak tufa-moss
- Hyocomium armoricum – flagellate feather-moss
- Hypnum andoi – mamillate plait-moss
- Hypnum bambergeri – golden plait-moss
- Hypnum callichroum – downy plait-moss
- Hypnum cupressiforme – cypress-leaved plait-moss
- Hypnum hamulosum – hook-leaved plait-moss
- Hypnum jutlandicum – heath plait-moss
- Hypnum lacunosum – great plait-moss
- Hypnum resupinatum – supine plait-moss
- Hypnum revolutum – revolute plait-moss
- Hypnum uncinulatum – hooked plait-moss
- Hypnum vaucheri – Vaucher's plait-moss
- Imbribryum mildeanum – Milde's thread-moss
- Imbribryum muehlenbeckii – Muehlenbeck's thread-moss
- Imbribryum subapiculatum – lesser potato Bryum
- Imbribryum tenuisetum – yellow-tuber thread-moss
- Isopterygiopsis muelleriana – Mueller's silk-moss
- Isopterygiopsis pulchella – neat silk-moss
- Isothecium alopecuroides – larger mouse-tail moss
- Isothecium holtii – Holt's mouse-tail moss
- Isothecium myosuroides – slender mouse-tail moss
- Kiaeria falcata – sickle-leaved fork-moss
- Kiaeria glacialis – snow fork-moss
- Kiaeria starkei – Starke's fork-moss
- Kindbergia praelonga – common feather-moss
- Leptobarbula berica – beric beard-moss
- Leptobryum pyriforme – golden thread-moss
- Leptodictyum riparium – Kneiff's feather-moss
- Leptodon smithii – Prince-of-Wales feather-moss
- Leptodontium flexifolium – bent-leaved beard-moss
- Leptodontium gemmascens – thatch-moss
- Leptophascum leptophyllum – vectis-moss
- Lescuraea saxicola – rock feather-moss
- Leskea polycarpa – many-fruited Leskea
- Leucobryum glaucum – large white-moss
- Leucobryum juniperoideum – smaller white-moss
- Leucodon sciuroides – squirrel-tail moss
- Loeskeobryum brevirostre – short-beaked wood-moss
- Meesia triquetra – three-ranked hump-moss
- Meesia uliginosa – broad-nerved hump-moss
- Microbryum curvicolle – swan-necked earth-moss
- Microbryum davallianum – smallest Pottia
- Microbryum floerkeanum – Floerke's phascum
- Microbryum rectum – upright Pottia
- Micromitrium tenerum – millimetre moss
- Mielichhoferia elongata – elongate copper-moss
- Mielichhoferia mielichhoferiana – alpine copper-moss
- Mnium ambiguum – ambiguous thyme-moss
- Mnium hornum – swan's-neck thyme-moss
- Mnium marginatum – bordered thyme-moss
- Mnium spinosum – spinose thyme-moss
- Mnium stellare – starry thyme-moss
- Mnium thomsonii – short-beaked thyme-moss
- Molendoa warburgii – Warburg's moss
- Myrinia pulvinata – flood-moss
- Myurella julacea – small mouse-tail moss
- Myurella tenerrima – dwarf mouse-tail moss
- Myurium hochstetteri – hare-tail moss
- Neckera crispa – crisped Neckera
- Neckera pennata – feathered Neckera
- Neckera pumila – dwarf Neckera
- Octodiceras fontanum – fountain pocket-moss
- Oedipodium griffithianum – gouty-moss
- Oligotrichum hercynicum – Hercynian haircap
- Oncophorus virens – green spur-moss
- Oncophorus wahlenbergii – wahlenberg's spur-moss
- Oreoweisia bruntonii – Brunton's dog-tooth
- Orthodontium gracile – slender thread-moss
- Orthodontium lineare – cape thread-moss
- Orthothecium intricatum – fine-leaved Leskea
- Orthothecium rufescens – red Leskea
- Orthotrichum affine – wood bristle-moss
- Orthotrichum anomalum – anomalous bristle-moss
- Orthotrichum cupulatum – hooded bristle-moss
- Orthotrichum diaphanum – white-tipped bristle-moss
- Orthotrichum gymnostomum – aspen bristle-moss
- Orthotrichum lyellii – Lyell's bristle-moss
- Orthotrichum obtusifolium – blunt-leaved bristle-moss
- Orthotrichum pallens – pale bristle-moss
- Orthotrichum pulchellum – elegant bristle-moss
- Orthotrichum pumilum – dwarf bristle-moss
- Orthotrichum rivulare – river bristle-moss
- Orthotrichum rupestre – rock bristle-moss
- Orthotrichum speciosum – showy bristle-moss
- Orthotrichum sprucei – Spruce's bristle-moss
- Orthotrichum stramineum – straw bristle-moss
- Orthotrichum striatum – Shaw's bristle-moss
- Orthotrichum tenellum – slender bristle-moss
- Oxyrrhynchium hians – Swartz's feather-moss
- Oxyrrhynchium schleicheri – twist-tip feather-moss
- Oxyrrhynchium speciosum – showy feather-moss
- Paludella squarrosa – tufted fen-moss
- Palustriella commutata – curled hook-moss
- Palustriella decipiens – lesser curled hook-moss
- Palustriella falcata – claw-leaved hook-moss
- Paraleptodontium recurvifolium – drooping-leaved beard-moss
- Paraleucobryum longifolium – long-leaved fork-moss
- Philonotis arnellii – Arnell's apple-moss
- Philonotis caespitosa – tufted apple-moss
- Philonotis calcarea – thick-nerved apple-moss
- Philonotis cernua – swan-necked apple-moss
- Philonotis fontana – fountain apple-moss
- Philonotis marchica – bog apple-moss
- Philonotis rigida – rigid apple-moss
- Philonotis seriata – spiral apple-moss
- Philonotis tomentella – woolly apple-moss
- Physcomitrella patens – spreading earth-moss
- Physcomitrium eurystomum – Norfolk bladder-moss
- Physcomitrium pyriforme – common bladder-moss
- Physcomitrium sphaericum – dwarf bladder-moss
- Pictus scoticus – pict-moss
- Plagiobryum demissum – alpine hump-moss
- Plagiobryum zieri – zierian hump-moss
- Plagiomnium affine – many-fruited thyme-moss
- Plagiomnium cuspidatum – woodsy thyme-moss
- Plagiomnium elatum – tall thyme-moss
- Plagiomnium ellipticum – marsh thyme-moss
- Plagiomnium medium – alpine thyme-moss
- Plagiomnium rostratum – long-beaked thyme-moss
- Plagiomnium undulatum – hart's-tongue thyme-moss
- Plagiopus oederianus – Oeder's apple-moss
- Plagiothecium cavifolium – round silk-moss
- Plagiothecium curvifolium – curved silk-moss
- Plagiothecium denticulatum – dented silk-moss
- Plagiothecium laetum – bright silk-moss
- Plagiothecium latebricola – alder silk-moss
- Plagiothecium nemorale – woodsy silk-moss
- Plagiothecium piliferum – hair silk-moss
- Plagiothecium platyphyllum – alpine silk-moss
- Plagiothecium succulentum – juicy silk-moss
- Plagiothecium undulatum – waved silk-moss
- Platydictya jungermannioides – Spruce's Leskea
- Platygyrium repens – flat-brocade moss
- Platyhypnidium alopecuroides – Portuguese feather-moss
- Platyhypnidium riparioides – long-beaked water feather-moss
- Platyhypnum molle – soft brook-moss
- Pleuridium acuminatum – taper-leaved earth-moss
- Pleuridium subulatum – awl-leaved earth-moss
- Pleurochaete squarrosa – side-fruited crisp-moss
- Pleurozium schreberi – red-stemmed feather-moss
- Pogonatum aloides – aloe haircap
- Pogonatum nanum – dwarf haircap
- Pogonatum urnigerum – urn haircap
- Pohlia andalusica – gravel thread-moss
- Pohlia annotina – pale-fruited thread-moss
- Pohlia bulbifera – blunt-bud thread-moss
- Pohlia camptotrachela – crookneck nodding-moss
- Pohlia cruda – opal thread-moss
- Pohlia crudoides – Lapland thread-moss
- Pohlia drummondii – Drummond's thread-moss
- Pohlia elongata – long-fruited thread-moss
- Pohlia filum – fat-bud thread-moss
- Pohlia flexuosa – orange-bud thread-moss
- Pohlia lescuriana – pretty nodding-moss
- Pohlia ludwigii – Ludwig's thread-moss
- Pohlia lutescens – yellow thread-moss
- Pohlia melanodon – pink-fruited thread-moss
- Pohlia nutans – nodding thread-moss
- Pohlia obtusifolia – blunt-leaved thread-moss
- Pohlia proligera – bent-bud thread-moss
- Pohlia scotica – Scottish thread-moss
- Pohlia wahlenbergii – pale glaucous thread-moss
- Polytrichastrum alpinum – alpine haircap
- Polytrichastrum formosum – bank haircap
- Polytrichastrum longisetum – slender haircap
- Polytrichastrum sexangulare – northern haircap
- Polytrichum commune – common haircap
- Polytrichum juniperinum – juniper haircap
- Polytrichum piliferum – bristly haircap
- Polytrichum strictum – strict haircap
- Pottia starkeana – Starke's Pottia
- Pottiopsis caespitosa – round-fruited Pottia
- Protobryum bryoides – tall Pottia
- Pseudanomodon attenuatus – slender tail-moss
- Pseudephemerum nitidum – delicate earth-moss
- Pseudobryum cinclidioides – river thyme-moss
- Pseudocalliergon turgescens – turgid scorpion-moss
- Pseudocrossidium hornschuchianum – Hornschuch's beard-moss
- Pseudocrossidium revolutum – revolute beard-moss
- Pseudoleskea incurvata – brown mountain Leskea
- Pseudoleskea patens – patent Leskea
- Pseudoleskeella catenulata – chained Leskea
- Pseudoleskeella nervosa – nerved Leskea
- Pseudoleskeella rupestris – wispy Leskea
- Pseudoscleropodium purum – neat feather-moss
- Pseudotaxiphyllum elegans – elegant silk-moss
- Pterigynandrum filiforme – capillary wing-moss
- Pterogonium gracile – bird's-foot wing-moss
- Pterygoneurum lamellatum – spiral chalk-moss
- Pterygoneurum ovatum – oval-leaved Pottia
- Ptilium crista-castrensis – ostrich-plume feather-moss
- Ptychodium plicatum – plaited Leskea
- Ptychomitrium polyphyllum – long-shanked pincushion
- Ptychostomum archangelicum – archangelic thread-moss
- Ptychostomum arcticum – Arctic thread-moss
- Ptychostomum bimum – bimous marsh Bryum
- Ptychostomum calophyllum – blunt Bryum
- Ptychostomum cernuum – cernuous thread-moss
- Ptychostomum compactum – drooping thread-moss
- Ptychostomum creberrimum – tight-tufted thread-moss
- Ptychostomum cyclophyllum – round-leaved Bryum
- Ptychostomum funkii – Funck's thread-moss
- Ptychostomum imbricatulum – tufted thread-moss
- Ptychostomum intermedium – many-seasoned thread-moss
- Ptychostomum knowltonii – Knowlton's thread-moss
- Ptychostomum marratii – Baltic Bryum
- Ptychostomum neodamense – long-leaved thread-moss
- Ptychostomum pallens – pale thread-moss
- Ptychostomum pallescens – tall-clustered thread-moss
- Ptychostomum pseudotriquetrum – marsh Bryum
- Ptychostomum salinum – saltmarsh thread-moss
- Ptychostomum schleicheri – Schleicher's thread-moss
- Ptychostomum turbinatum – topshape thread-moss
- Ptychostomum warneum – warne's thread-moss
- Ptychostomum weigelii – duval's thread-moss
- Pylaisia polyantha – many-flowered Leskea
- Racomitrium aciculare – yellow fringe-moss
- Racomitrium affine – lesser fringe-moss
- Racomitrium aquaticum – narrow-leaved fringe-moss
- Racomitrium canescens – hoary fringe-moss
- Racomitrium ellipticum – oval-fruited fringe-moss
- Racomitrium elongatum – long fringe-moss
- Racomitrium ericoides – dense fringe-moss
- Racomitrium fasciculare – green mountain fringe-moss
- Racomitrium heterostichum – bristly fringe-moss
- Racomitrium himalayanum – Himalayan fringe-moss
- Racomitrium lanuginosum – woolly fringe-moss
- Racomitrium macounii – Macoun's fringe-moss
- Racomitrium sudeticum – slender fringe-moss
- Rhabdoweisia crenulata – greater streak-moss
- Rhabdoweisia crispata – toothed streak-moss
- Rhabdoweisia fugax – dwarf streak-moss
- Rhizomnium magnifolium – large-leaf thyme-moss
- Rhizomnium pseudopunctatum – felted thyme-moss
- Rhizomnium punctatum – dotted thyme-moss
- Rhodobryum roseum – rose-moss
- Rhynchostegiella curviseta – curve-stalked feather-moss
- Rhynchostegiella litorea – scabrous feather-moss
- Rhynchostegiella pumila – dwarf feather-moss
- Rhynchostegiella tenella – tender feather-moss
- Rhynchostegiella teneriffae – Teesdale feather-moss
- Rhynchostegium confertum – clustered feather-moss
- Rhynchostegium megapolitanum – megapolitan feather-moss
- Rhynchostegium murale – wall feather-moss
- Rhynchostegium rotundifolium – round-leaved feather-moss
- Rhytidiadelphus loreus – little shaggy-moss
- Rhytidiadelphus squarrosus – springy turf-moss
- Rhytidiadelphus subpinnatus – scarce turf-moss
- Rhytidiadelphus triquetrus – big shaggy-moss
- Rhytidium rugosum – wrinkle-leaved feather-moss
- Rosulabryum bornholmense – potato Bryum
- Rosulabryum canariense – canary thread-moss
- Rosulabryum capillare – capillary thread-moss
- Rosulabryum donianum – Don's thread-moss
- Rosulabryum elegans – blushing Bryum
- Rosulabryum moravicum – flabby thread-moss
- Rosulabryum rubens – crimson-tuber thread-moss
- Rosulabryum torquescens – twisting thread-moss
- Saelania glaucescens – blue dew-moss
- Sanionia orthothecioides – St Kilda hook-moss
- Sanionia uncinata – sickle-leaved hook-moss
- Schistidium agassizii – water Grimmia
- Schistidium atrofuscum – black mountain Grimmia
- Schistidium confertum – compact Grimmia
- Schistidium crassipilum – thickpoint Grimmia
- Schistidium dupretii – Dupret's Grimmia
- Schistidium elegantulum – elegant Grimmia
- Schistidium flaccidum – goblet Grimmia
- Schistidium frigidum – frigid Grimmia
- Schistidium maritimum – seaside Grimmia
- Schistidium papillosum – rough Grimmia
- Schistidium platyphyllum – broadleaf Grimmia
- Schistidium pruinosum – mealy Grimmia
- Schistidium rivulare – river Grimmia
- Schistidium robustum – robust Grimmia
- Schistidium strictum – upright brown Grimmia
- Schistidium trichodon – stook Grimmia
- Schistostega pennata – luminous moss
- Scleropodium cespitans – tufted feather-moss
- Scleropodium tourettii – glass-wort feather-moss
- Scopelophila cataractae – tongue-leaf copper-moss
- Scorpidium cossonii – intermediate hook-moss
- Scorpidium revolvens – rusty hook-moss
- Scorpidium scorpioides – hooked scorpion-moss
- Scorpiurium circinatum – curving feather-moss
- Seligeria acutifolia – sharp rock-bristle
- Seligeria brevifolia – short rock-bristle
- Seligeria calcarea – chalk rock-bristle
- Seligeria calycina – English rock-bristle
- Seligeria campylopoda – bentfoot rock-bristle
- Seligeria carniolica – water rock-bristle
- Seligeria diversifolia – long rock-bristle
- Seligeria donniana – Donn's rock-bristle
- Seligeria oelandica – Irish rock-bristle
- Seligeria pusilla – dwarf rock-bristle
- Seligeria recurvata – recurved rock-bristle
- Sematophyllum demissum – prostrate signal-moss
- Sematophyllum micans – sparkling signal-moss
- Sematophyllum substrumulosum – bark signal-moss
- Sphagnum affine – imbricate bog-moss
- Sphagnum angustifolium – fine bog-moss
- Sphagnum austinii – Austin's bog-moss
- Sphagnum balticum – Baltic bog-moss
- Sphagnum capillifolium – red bog-moss
- Sphagnum compactum – compact bog-moss
- Sphagnum contortum – twisted bog-moss
- Sphagnum cuspidatum – feathery bog-moss
- Sphagnum denticulatum – cow-horn bog-moss
- Sphagnum fallax – flat-topped bog-moss
- Sphagnum fimbriatum – fringed bog-moss
- Sphagnum flexuosum – flexuous bog-moss
- Sphagnum fuscum – rusty bog-moss
- Sphagnum girgensohnii – Girgensohn's bog-moss
- Sphagnum inundatum – lesser cow-horn bog-moss
- Sphagnum lindbergii – Lindberg's bog-moss
- Sphagnum magellanicum – Magellanic bog-moss
- Sphagnum majus – olive bog-moss
- Sphagnum molle – blushing bog-moss
- Sphagnum obtusum – obtuse bog-moss
- Sphagnum palustre – blunt-leaved bog-moss
- Sphagnum papillosum – papillose bog-moss
- Sphagnum platyphyllum – flat-leaved bog-moss
- Sphagnum pulchrum – golden bog-moss
- Sphagnum quinquefarium – five-ranked bog-moss
- Sphagnum riparium – cleft bog-moss
- Sphagnum russowii – Russow's bog-moss
- Sphagnum skyense – Skye bog-moss
- Sphagnum squarrosum – spiky bog-moss
- Sphagnum strictum – pale bog-moss
- Sphagnum subnitens – lustrous bog-moss
- Sphagnum subsecundum – slender cow-horn bog-moss
- Sphagnum tenellum – soft bog-moss
- Sphagnum teres – rigid bog-moss
- Sphagnum warnstorfii – Warnstorf's bog-moss
- Splachnum ampullaceum – cruet collar-moss
- Splachnum sphaericum – round-fruited collar-moss
- Splachnum vasculosum – rugged collar-moss
- Stegonia latifolia – hood-leaved screw-moss
- Straminergon stramineum – straw spear-moss
- Syntrichia amplexa – clay screw-moss
- Syntrichia intermedia – intermediate screw-moss
- Syntrichia laevipila – small hairy screw-moss
- Syntrichia latifolia – water screw-moss
- Syntrichia norvegica – Norway screw-moss
- Syntrichia papillosa – marble screw-moss
- Syntrichia princeps – brown screw-moss
- Syntrichia ruralis – great hairy screw-moss
- Syntrichia virescens – lesser screw-moss
- Taxiphyllum wissgrillii – depressed feather-moss
- Tayloria lingulata – tongue-leaved gland-moss
- Tayloria tenuis – slender gland-moss
- Tetraphis pellucida – pellucid four-tooth moss
- Tetraplodon angustatus – narrow cruet-moss
- Tetraplodon mnioides – slender cruet-moss
- Tetrodontium brownianum – brown's four-tooth moss
- Tetrodontium repandum – small four-tooth moss
- Thamnobryum alopecurum – fox-tail feather-moss
- Thamnobryum angustifolium – Derbyshire feather-moss
- Thamnobryum cataractarum – Yorkshire feather-moss
- Thuidium assimile – Philibert's tamarisk-moss
- Thuidium delicatulum – delicate tamarisk-moss
- Thuidium recognitum – lesser tamarisk-moss
- Thuidium tamariscinum – common tamarisk-moss
- Timmia austriaca – sheathed Timmia
- Timmia norvegica – Norway Timmia
- Tomentypnum nitens – woolly feather-moss
- Tortella densa – clint crisp-moss
- Tortella flavovirens – yellow crisp-moss
- Tortella fragilis – brittle crisp-moss
- Tortella inclinata – bent crisp-moss
- Tortella inflexa – Sassari crisp-moss
- Tortella limosella – Arisaig crisp-moss
- Tortella nitida – neat crisp-moss
- Tortella tortuosa – frizzled crisp-moss
- Tortula acaulon – cuspidate earth-moss
- Tortula atrovirens – rib-leaf moss
- Tortula canescens – dog screw-moss
- Tortula cernua – flamingo-moss
- Tortula cuneifolia – wedge-leaved screw-moss
- Tortula freibergii – Freiberg's screw-moss
- Tortula lanceola – lance-leaved Pottia
- Tortula leucostoma – alpine Pottia
- Tortula marginata – bordered screw-moss
- Tortula modica – blunt-fruited Pottia
- Tortula muralis – wall screw-moss
- Tortula solmsii – solms' screw-moss
- Tortula subulata – awl-leaved screw-moss
- Tortula truncata – common Pottia
- Tortula vahliana – chalk screw-moss
- Tortula viridifolia – bristly Pottia
- Tortula wilsonii – Wilson's Pottia
- Trematodon ambiguus – ambiguous long-necked moss
- Trichodon cylindricus – cylindric ditrichum
- Trichostomum brachydontium – variable crisp-moss
- Trichostomum crispulum – curly crisp-moss
- Trichostomum hibernicum – Irish crisp-moss
- Trichostomum tenuirostre – narrow-fruited crisp-moss
- Ulota bruchii – Bruch's pincushion
- Ulota calvescens – balding pincushion
- Ulota coarctata – club pincushion
- Ulota crispa – crisped pincushion
- Ulota drummondii – Drummond's pincushion
- Ulota hutchinsiae – Hutchins' pincushion
- Ulota phyllantha – frizzled pincushion
- Warnstorfia exannulata – ringless hook-moss
- Warnstorfia fluitans – floating hook-moss
- Warnstorfia sarmentosa – twiggy spear-moss
- Weissia brachycarpa – small-mouthed beardless-moss
- Weissia condensa – curly beardless-moss
- Weissia controversa – green-tufted stubble-moss
- Weissia levieri – levier's beardless-moss
- Weissia longifolia – crisp beardless-moss
- Weissia multicapsularis – many-fruited beardless-moss
- Weissia perssonii – Persson's stubble-moss
- Weissia rostellata – beaked beardless-moss
- Weissia rutilans – pointed-leaved stubble-moss
- Weissia squarrosa – spreading-leaved beardless-moss
- Weissia sterilis – sterile beardless-moss
- Weissia x mittenii – Mitten's beardless-moss
- Zygodon conoideus – lesser yoke-moss
- Zygodon forsteri – knothole yoke-moss
- Zygodon gracilis – slender yoke-moss
- Zygodon rupestris – park yoke-moss
- Zygodon stirtonii – Stirton's yoke-moss
- Zygodon viridissimus – green yoke-moss
