= Redshank =

Redshank may refer to:

- Redshank (soldier), 16th-century Scottish mercenaries

== Birds ==
- Common redshank Tringa totanus, a shorebird
- Spotted redshank Tringa erythropus, a shorebird

== Plants ==
- Redshanks Adenostoma sparsifolium, a shrub
- Redshank Persicaria maculosa, a plant in the buckwheat family
- Redshank Ceratodon purpureus, a moss
- Scarce redshank Ceratodon conicus, a moss of Britain and Ireland
