= Dicranella =

Dicranella may refer to:

- Dicranella (plant), a plant genus in the family Dicranaceae
- Dicranella (crustacean), a fossil ostracod genus in the family Tvaerenellidae
