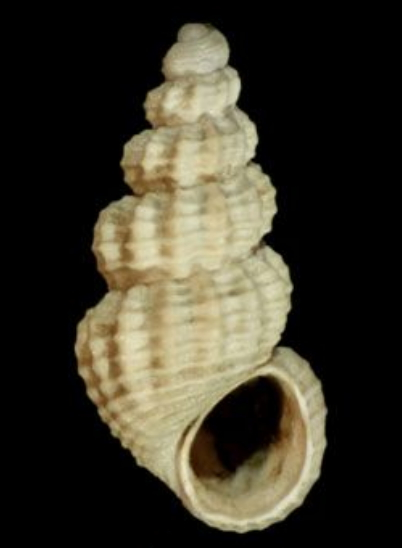
- Shell of Alvania internodula (specimen at the Natural History Museum, Rotterdam)

Scientific classification
- Kingdom: Animalia
- Phylum: Mollusca
- Class: Gastropoda
- Subclass: Caenogastropoda
- Order: Littorinimorpha
- Family: Rissoidae
- Genus: Alvania
- Species: A. internodula

Binomial name
- Alvania internodula Hoenselaar & Goud, 1998

= Alvania internodula =

Species of gastropod

Alvania internodula is a species of minute sea snail, a marine gastropod mollusk or micromollusk in the family Rissoidae.

== Description ==
The shell of Alvania internodula is biconical, solid, and features a protruding apex. The shell is characterized by prominent spiral ribs that intersect with less conspicuous axial ribs. Its color is highly variable, ranging from opaque white to totally brown. Some specimens exhibit partial brown coloring on the upper whorls (specifically the protoconch and first teleoconch whorl) or a single subsutural brown spot just before the final varix.

=== Shell morphology ===
The shell structure can be divided into two main growth phases:

- Protoconch (larval shell): Averages 0.32 mm in diameter and consists of approximately 1.1 convex whorls. It is sculptured with five thin spiral ridges, with the interstices (spaces between them) being four times as wide as the ridges themselves.
- Teleoconch (adult shell): Consists of 3.5 convex whorls, with the body whorl featuring a sharp angle at its periphery.

The ribbing of the adult shell grows progressively more complex:

- First whorl: Two spiral ribs begin immediately at the demarcation between the protoconch and teleoconch.
- Second whorl: Develops three spiral ribs.
- Body whorl: Features 11 strong, prominent spiral ribs. The interstices are equal to the width of the spiral ribs.

About half a whorl after the protoconch-teleoconch border, faint axial subsutural costae (vertical ribs) begin to form. These gradually increase in size but remain less pronounced than the spiral ribs, ending just below the periphery. Where the spiral ribs and costae cross, they form strong nodules. The body whorl features 10 to 12 of these radial costae, ending in a strong varix that is overrun by the spiral ribs.

At a microscopic level, the interstices between the spiral ribs are covered by numerous neatly aligned, very small nodules that run over the axial costae. The shell's aperture is semicircular with a simple peristome. The inner lip is coated with a very thin glaze of callus that reflects over the umbilical area.

=== Dimensions ===
Based on a sample size of 53 specimens, the shell dimensions are:

- Height: 1.50–2.10 mm
- Width: 0.90–1.15 mm
- Holotype: 1.60 mm (height) × 0.90 mm (width)

== Etymology ==
The specific name internodula is derived from the microscopic nodules located in the interspaces of the shell's spiral ribs.

== Similar species ==
Alvania internodula is morphologically similar to Manzonia spreta (Watson, 1873). It can be differentiated from M. spreta by observing the spaces between the spiral ribs: A. internodula features aligned nodules, whereas M. spreta features spiral threads. Additionally, M. spreta possesses a double peristome around its aperture and seven spiral threads on its protoconch.

== Distribution ==
Alvania internodula is a marine species endemic to the Northeast Atlantic Ocean. Its distribution is documented off the coast of the Azores, which serves as the species' type locality (originally collected at a depth of 88 meters). Its range also extends south along the western coast of Africa, with populations recorded off the coast of Mauritania.
