= D. crispa =

D. crispa may refer to:

- Danaea crispa, a fern species in the genus Danaea
- Dicranella crispa, a moss species in the genus Dicranella

== See also ==
- Crispa (disambiguation)
