= Weissia bizotii =

Scientific classification
- Kingdom: Plantae
- Division: Bryophyta
- Class: Bryopsida
- Subclass: Dicranidae
- Order: Pottiales
- Family: Pottiaceae
- Genus: Weissia
- Species: W. bizotii

Binomial name
- Weissia bizotii Zander (1993)

Species of plant

Weissia bizotii is a species of moss in the Pottiaceae family.

== Distribution ==
Weissia bizotii is found in Tanzania.
