= Oncophorus =

Scientific classification
- Kingdom: Plantae
- Clade: Embryophytes
- Division: Bryophyta
- Class: Bryopsida
- Subclass: Dicranidae
- Order: Dicranales
- Family: Dicranaceae
- Genus: Oncophorus (Brid.) Brid.

Genus of mosses

Oncophorus is a genus of mosses belonging to the family Dicranaceae.

The genus has almost cosmopolitan distribution.

There are 17 species, including:

- Oncophorus conglomeratus Brid.
- Oncophorus crenulatus (Mitt.) Braithw.
- Oncophorus gracilentus S.Y. Zeng
- Oncophorus integerrimus Hedenäs
- Oncophorus virens (Hedw.)
- Oncophorus wahlenbergii Brid.
