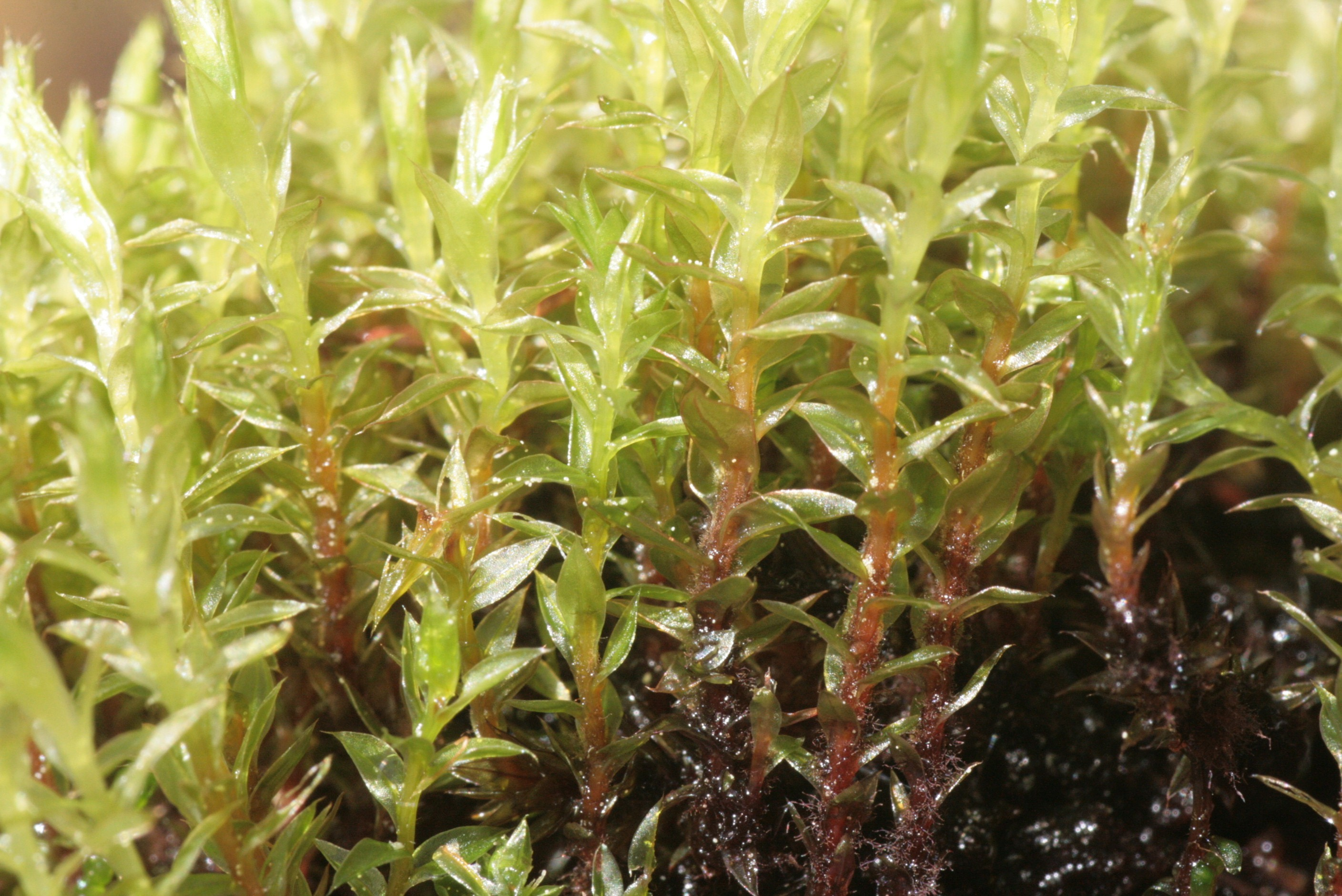

Scientific classification
- Kingdom: Plantae
- Division: Bryophyta
- Class: Bryopsida
- Subclass: Bryidae
- Order: Bryales
- Family: Bryaceae
- Genus: Ptychostomum
- Subgenus: Ptychostomum subg. Cladodium
- Species: P. pseudotriquetrum

Binomial name
- Ptychostomum pseudotriquetrum (Hedw.) J.R. Spence & H.P. Ramsay ex Holyoak & N. Pedersen

Synonyms
- List: Bryum bimum subsp. pseudotriquetrum (Hedw.) Dixon; Bryum pseudotriquetrum (Hedw.) G. Gaertn., B. Mey. & Scherb.; Bryum ventricosum var. pseudotriquetrum (Hedw.) Hampe; Hypnum pseudotriquetrum (Hedw.) F; . Weber & D. Mohr Mnium pseudotriquetrum; Hedw. Plagiobryum pseudotriquetrum; (Hedw.) N. Pedersen Bryum aciculinum; Kindb. Bryum algens; Cardot Bryum alpiniforme; Kindb. Bryum pseudotriquetrum f. alpiniforme; (Kindb.) Podp. Bryum alpinum subsp. haematocarpum; (Müll. Hal. & Kindb.) Podp. Bryum haematocarpum; Müll. Hal. & Kindb. Bryum amoenum; (Warnst.) Podp. Bryum bimum subsp. amoenum; (Warnst.) J.J. Amann Bryum bimum var. amoenum; Warnst. Bryum pseudotriquetrum var. amoenum; (Warnst.) Wijk Bryum ventricosum subsp. amoenum; (Warnst.) Giacom. Bryum amoenum var. cavifolium; Podp. Bryum aulacomnioides; Müll. Hal. Bryum aulacomnioides var. limbatum; Sim Bryum austroaffine; Broth. Bryum austrocaespiticium; Müll. Hal. Bryum austropolare; Cardot Bryum austroventricosum; Renauld Bryum bimoideum; De Not. Bryum pseudotriquetrum subsp. bimoideum; (De Not.) Podp. Bryum pseudotriquetrum var. bimoideum; (De Not.) Podp. Bryum ventricosum subsp. bimoideum; (De Not.) Kindb. Bryum ventricosum var. bimoideum; (De Not.) Mönk. Bryum bimum var. compactum; (Bruch & Schimp.) Dixon Bryum pseudotriquetrum var. compactum; Bruch & Schimp. Bryum ventricosum var. compactum; (Bruch & Schimp.) Lindb. Bryum brachycarpum; E.B. Bartram Bryum brachychaete; Cardot & Broth. Bryum brachymeniaceum Müll. Hal.; Bryum bujukuense P. de la Varde; Bryum bujukuense f. aristatum P. de la Varde; Bryum capillare var. norvegicum (Kaurin & Arnell) I. Hagen; Bryum elegans var. norvegicum Kaurin & Arnell; Bryum pseudotriquetrum f. norvegicum (Kaurin & Arnell) Podp.; Bryum crassirameum Renauld & Cardot; Bryum provinciale subsp. crassirameum (Renauld & Cardot) Kindb.; Bryum pseudotriquetrum subsp. crassirameum (Renauld & Cardot) Podp.; Bryum pseudotriquetrum var. crassirameum (Renauld & Cardot) E. Lawton; Bryum crassirameum var. covillei Renauld & Cardot; Bryum pseudotriquetrum f. covillei (Renauld & Cardot) Podp.; Bryum crispulum Hampe ex I. Hagen; Bryum crispulum f. majus Schljakov; Bryum crispulum f. propaguliferum Arnell & C.E.O. Jensen; Bryum pseudotriquetrum f. propaguliferum (Arnell & C.E.O. Jensen) Podp.; Bryum crispulum var. densifolium Bryhn & Ryan; Bryum pseudotriquetrum f. densifolium (Bryhn & Ryan) Podp.; Bryum cubitale Dicks.; Bryum pseudotriquetrum var. cubitale (Dicks.) Brid.; Mnium cubitale (Dicks.) P. Beauv.; Bryum decurrens Müll. Hal.; Bryum decurrentinervium Müll. Hal.; Bryum dimorphophyllum Cardot & Thér.; Bryum pseudotriquetrum f. dimorphophyllum (Cardot & Thér.) Podp.; Bryum duvalioides (Itzigs.) Warnst.; Bryum pseudotriquetrum var. duvalioides Itzigs.; Bryum ventricosum subsp. duvalioides (Itzigs.) J.J. Amann; Bryum ventricosum var. duvalioides (Itzigs.) Głow.; Bryum duvalioides var. brevifolium Mikut.; Bryum pseudotriquetrum f. brevifolium (Mikut.) Podp.; Bryum duvalioides var. cuspidatum Mikut.; Bryum pseudotriquetrum f. cuspidatum (Mikut.) Podp.; Bryum duvalioides var. elatum Hamm.; Bryum pseudotriquetrum f. elatum (Hamm.) Podp.; Bryum ellipticum Sande Lac.; Bryum euryloma Cardot & Thér.; Bryum pseudotriquetrum f. euryloma (Cardot & Thér.) Podp.; Bryum filicaule Broth.; Bryum geniculatum Vill. ex Brid.; Mnium geniculatum (Vill. ex Brid.) P. Beauv.; Bryum gerlachei (Cardot) Cardot; Webera gerlachei Cardot; Bryum gracilens Cardot; Bryum pseudotriquetrum f. gracilens (Cardot) Podp.; Bryum pseudotriquetrum var. gracilens (Cardot) Ochi; Bryum hickenii Herzog (acceptable); Bryum hyalodontium (Müll. Hal. & Kindb.) Müll. Hal.; Bryum pseudotriquetrum f. hyalodontium (Müll. Hal. & Kindb.) Podp.; Bryum pseudotriquetrum var. hyalodontium Müll. Hal. & Kindb.; Bryum ventricosum subsp. hyalodontium (Müll. Hal. & Kindb.) Kindb.; Bryum inclusum Müll. Hal.; Bryum inconnexum var. fragile Horik. & Ando; Bryum intortulum Stirt.; Bryum jackii Müll. Hal.; Bryum pseudotriquetrum subsp. jackii (Müll. Hal.) Podp.; Bryum korotkevicziae L.I. Savicz & Smirnova; Bryum korotkevicziae var. hollerbachii L.I. Savicz & Smirnova; Bryum macrochaete Cardot; Bryum macropelma Müll. Hal.; Bryum malacophyllum Broth.; Bryum maudii R. Br. bis; Bryum muehlenbeckii subsp. subpercurrentinerve (Kindb.) Podp.; Bryum subpercurrentinerve Kindb.; Bryum neodamense var. crispulum G. Roth; Bryum pseudotriquetrum subsp. crispulum (G. Roth) C.E.O. Jensen; Bryum ventricosum var. crispulum (G. Roth) C.E.O. Jensen; Bryum neodamense var. turgens (I. Hagen) G. Roth; Bryum pseudotriquetrum subsp. turgens (I. Hagen) C.E.O. Jensen; Bryum turgens I. Hagen; Bryum ventricosum var. turgens (I. Hagen) C.E.O. Jensen; Bryum nevadense Warnst.; Bryum obesothecium R. Br. bis; Bryum ongulense Horik. & Ando; Bryum ovatum var. uncinatulum Latzel; Bryum pseudotriquetrum f. uncinatulum (Latzel) Podp.; Bryum pallens var. greisigerae Podp.; Bryum perangustidens Cardot; Bryum percomatum J.J. Amann; Bryum pseudotriquetrum subsp. percomatum (J.J. Amann) Podp.; Bryum planomarginatum Dixon; Bryum possessionis Broth.; Bryum pseudocrispulum L.I. Savicz; Bryum pseudofallax Cardot & Broth.; Bryum pseudotriquetriforme Cardot; Bryum pseudotriquetriforme var. densum Cardot; Bryum pseudotriquetrum f. acutatum Broth. ex Podp.; Bryum pseudotriquetrum f. acutum Podp.; Bryum pseudotriquetrum f. alaricola Podp.; Bryum pseudotriquetrum f. alpinum Podp. ex Györffy; Bryum pseudotriquetrum f. anacamptum Podp.; Bryum pseudotriquetrum f. angustatum (Cardot) Podp.; Bryum pseudotriquetrum var. angustatum Cardot; Bryum ventricosum var. angustatum (Cardot) Ihsiba; Bryum pseudotriquetrum f. angustifolium (Lindb.) Podp.; Bryum pseudotriquetrum var. angustifolium (Lindb.) Limpr.; Bryum ventricosum var. angustifolium Lindb.; Bryum pseudotriquetrum f. anomalum (Mikut.) Podp.; Bryum pseudotriquetrum var. anomalum Mikut.; Bryum ventricosum var. anomalum (Mikut.) Warnst.; Bryum pseudotriquetrum f. apiociden Podp.; Bryum pseudotriquetrum f. aquilanum (Bott.) Podp.; Bryum ventricosum var. aquilanum Bott.; Bryum pseudotriquetrum f. arcticum Müll. Hal.; Bryum pseudotriquetrum var. arcticum (Müll. Hal.) C.E.O. Jensen; Bryum pseudotriquetrum f. aristulatum Podp.; Bryum pseudotriquetrum f. atheroferum (Podp.) Podp.; Bryum ventricosum var. atheroferum Podp.; Bryum pseudotriquetrum f. atropurpureum Podp.; Bryum pseudotriquetrum f. bornmuelleri (Schiffn.) Podp.; Bryum pseudotriquetrum var. bornmuelleri Schiffn.; Bryum pseudotriquetrum f. borosii Podp.; Bryum pseudotriquetrum f. brachycarpum Broth. ex Podp.; Bryum pseudotriquetrum f. breidleri Podp.; Bryum pseudotriquetrum f. brevirete Podp.; Bryum pseudotriquetrum f. catabaptistum Podp.; Bryum pseudotriquetrum f. cavifrons Podp.; Bryum pseudotriquetrum f. cephalophorum Podp.; Bryum pseudotriquetrum f. colymbetes Podp.; Bryum pseudotriquetrum f. crassinervium Podp.; Bryum pseudotriquetrum f. crispatum Podp.; Bryum pseudotriquetrum f. cylindricum Podp.; Bryum pseudotriquetrum f. dasyphyum Podp.; Bryum pseudotriquetrum f. densiusculum Podp.; Bryum pseudotriquetrum f. densum Boros ex Podp.; Bryum pseudotriquetrum f. drivaecolum Podp.; Bryum pseudotriquetrum f. filum Podp.; Bryum pseudotriquetrum f. flagellare Arnell ex Podp.; Bryum pseudotriquetrum f. furcotae Podp.; Bryum pseudotriquetrum f. glaciale (Podp.) Podp.; Bryum pseudotriquetrum var. glaciale Podp.; Bryum pseudotriquetrum f. gracillimum (Arnell) Podp.; Bryum ventricosum f. gracillimum Arnell; Bryum pseudotriquetrum f. gravetii Podp.; Bryum pseudotriquetrum f. humile-operculatum (H. Winter) Podp.; Bryum ventricosum var. humile-operculatum H. Winter; Bryum pseudotriquetrum f. immarginatum Tosco; Bryum pseudotriquetrum f. inflatum Podp.; Bryum pseudotriquetrum f. inundatum (Warnst.) Podp.; Bryum pseudotriquetrum var. inundatum (Warnst.) Mikut.; Bryum ventricosum var. inundatum Warnst.; Bryum pseudotriquetrum f. latelimbatum Podp.; Bryum pseudotriquetrum f. latifolium (Lindb.) Podp.; Bryum pseudotriquetrum var. latifolium (Lindb.) Limpr.; Bryum ventricosum var. latifolium Lindb. (acceptable); Bryum pseudotriquetrum f. latifrons Podp.; Bryum pseudotriquetrum f. laxum (Podp.) Podp.; Bryum ventricosum f. laxum Podp. (acceptable); Bryum pseudotriquetrum f. leptoderma Podp.; Bryum pseudotriquetrum f. leptomerum Podp.; Bryum pseudotriquetrum f. limbatum Podp.; Bryum pseudotriquetrum f. longedecurrens (Mikut.) Podp.; Bryum ventricosum var. longedecurrens Mikut.; Bryum pseudotriquetrum f. longicollum Podp.; Bryum pseudotriquetrum f. longipes Podp.; Bryum pseudotriquetrum f. longipilum Podp.; Bryum pseudotriquetrum var. longipilum (Podp.) Podp.; Bryum ventricosum var. longipilum (Podp.) J.J. Amann; Bryum pseudotriquetrum f. longirete Podp.; Bryum pseudotriquetrum f. longisetum Podp.; Bryum pseudotriquetrum f. lorentzii Podp.; Bryum pseudotriquetrum f. macropyndax Podp.; Bryum pseudotriquetrum f. malochii Podp.; Bryum pseudotriquetrum f. margittaianum Podp.; Bryum pseudotriquetrum f. microalpinum Podp.; Bryum pseudotriquetrum f. minus Podp.; Bryum pseudotriquetrum f. molle Podp.; Bryum pseudotriquetrum f. montanum (Bom.) Podp.; Bryum pseudotriquetrum var. montanum (Bom.) C.E.O. Jensen; Bryum ventricosum var. montanum Bom.; Bryum pseudotriquetrum f. mucronatum Podp.; Bryum pseudotriquetrum f. nematophorum Podp.; Bryum pseudotriquetrum f. neomarchicum (Warnst.) Podp.; Bryum pseudotriquetrum var. neomarchicum Warnst.; Bryum ventricosum var. neomarchicum (Warnst.) Warnst.; Bryum pseudotriquetrum f. nevadense (Podp.) Podp.; Bryum pseudotriquetrum var. nevadense Podp.; Bryum pseudotriquetrum f. obtusomucronatum (Cardot) Podp.; Bryum pseudotriquetrum var. obtusomucronatum Cardot; Bryum ventricosum var. obtusomucronatum (Cardot) Ihsiba; Bryum pseudotriquetrum f. ovatulum Podp.; Bryum pseudotriquetrum f. ovoideum (Podp.) Podp.; Bryum ventricosum var. ovoideum Podp.; Bryum pseudotriquetrum f. oxycentrum Podp.; Bryum pseudotriquetrum f. perdensum Podp.; Bryum pseudotriquetrum f. piriforme Podp.; Bryum pseudotriquetrum f. planiusculum Podp.; Bryum pseudotriquetrum f. platydictyum Podp.; Bryum pseudotriquetrum f. platyphyllum (Podp.) Podp.; Bryum pseudotriquetrum platyphyllum Podp.; Bryum pseudotriquetrum f. propaguliferum (J.J. Amann) Podp.; Bryum ventricosum var. propaguliferum J.J. Amann; Bryum pseudotriquetrum f. psathyrum Podp.; Bryum pseudotriquetrum f. pseudoduvalii (Podp.) Podp.; Bryum pseudotriquetrum subsp. pseudoduvalii Podp.; Bryum pseudotriquetrum var. pseudoduvalii (Podp.) Podp.; Bryum ventricosum var. pseudoduvalii (Podp.) J.J. Amann; Bryum pseudotriquetrum f. pseudoelegans (J.J. Amann) Podp.; Bryum ventricosum var. pseudoelegans J.J. Amann; Bryum pseudotriquetrum f. punctatum Podp.; Bryum pseudotriquetrum f. purpureum (Corb.) Podp.; Bryum pseudotriquetrum var. purpureum Corb.; Bryum pseudotriquetrum f. ramentosum (Dixon) Podp.; Bryum ramentosum Dixon; Bryum pseudotriquetrum f. reflexum (Mikut.) Podp.; Bryum pseudotriquetrum var. reflexum Mikut.; Bryum pseudotriquetrum f. revolutum Podp.; Bryum pseudotriquetrum f. riloense Podp.; Bryum pseudotriquetrum f. rothii Podp.; Bryum pseudotriquetrum f. sanguineum Podp.; Bryum pseudotriquetrum f. scepusiense Podp.; Bryum pseudotriquetrum f. schallertii Podp.; Bryum pseudotriquetrum f. schisticola Podp.; Bryum pseudotriquetrum f. semilimbatum Podp.; Bryum pseudotriquetrum f. serpentini Podp.; Bryum pseudotriquetrum f. serratum Boros ex Podp.; Bryum pseudotriquetrum f. sphaeromorphum Podp.; Bryum pseudotriquetrum f. squarrosum (Warnst.) Podp.; Bryum pseudotriquetrum var. squarrosum (Warnst.) Mikut.; Bryum ventricosum var. squarrosum Warnst.; Bryum pseudotriquetrum f. stenocarpum Podp.; Bryum pseudotriquetrum f. strangulatum (Mikut.) Podp.; Bryum pseudotriquetrum var. strangulatum Mikut.; Bryum ventricosum var. strangulatum (Mikut.) Warnst.; Bryum pseudotriquetrum f. subarcticum Podp.; Bryum pseudotriquetrum f. submersum (H. Winter) Podp.; Bryum ventricosum f. submersum H. Winter; Bryum pseudotriquetrum f. subplanum Podp.; Bryum ventricosum f. subplanum (Podp.) Laz.; Bryum pseudotriquetrum f. subrotundatum Podp.; Bryum pseudotriquetrum f. subteres (Bryhn & Ryan) Podp.; Bryum ventricosum var. subteres Bryhn & Ryan; Bryum pseudotriquetrum f. supraalpinum Podp.; Bryum pseudotriquetrum f. traxleri Podp.; Bryum pseudotriquetrum f. tumidulum Podp.; Bryum pseudotriquetrum f. unzeitigii Podp.; Bryum pseudotriquetrum f. vestitum (Broth.) Podp.; Bryum pseudotriquetrum var. vestitum (Broth.) Wijk & Margad.; Bryum ventricosum var. vestitum Broth.; Bryum pseudotriquetrum f. xeroticum Podp.; Bryum pseudotriquetrum subsp. gracilescens (Schimp.) Podp.; Bryum pseudotriquetrum var. gracilescens Schimp.; Bryum ventricosum var. gracilescens (Schimp.) Lindb.; Bryum pseudotriquetrum subsp. pseudocrispulum Podp.; Bryum pseudotriquetrum subsp. septemvasale (G. Roth) Podp.; Bryum septemvasale G. Roth; Bryum pseudotriquetrum subsp. viaeregiae Podp.; Bryum pseudotriquetrum var. algeriense (Corb.) Wijk & Margad.; Bryum ventricosum var. algeriense Corb.; Bryum pseudotriquetrum var. angustilimbatum (Warnst.) Limpr.; Bryum ventricosum var. angustilimbatum Warnst.; Bryum pseudotriquetrum var. arcticum (Ryan) Paris; Bryum ventricosum var. arcticum Ryan; Bryum pseudotriquetrum var. atlanticum (C.E.O. Jensen) Limpr.; Bryum ventricosum var. atlanticum C.E.O. Jensen; Bryum pseudotriquetrum var. corconticum Podp.; Bryum ventricosum var. corconticum (Podp.) J.J. Amann; Bryum pseudotriquetrum var. crassinervium Podp.; Bryum pseudotriquetrum var. crassisetum Podp.; Bryum ventricosum var. crassisetum (Podp.) J.J. Amann; Bryum pseudotriquetrum var. dunarum Podp.; Bryum pseudotriquetrum var. elatum Nog.; Bryum ventricosum var. elatum (Nog.) Sakurai; Bryum pseudotriquetrum var. estigmenum Podp.; Bryum pseudotriquetrum var. eurydictyon (Latzel) Podp; Bryum pseudotriquetrum var. flaccidum Schimp.; Bryum pseudotriquetrum var. gogelanum Podp.; Bryum pseudotriquetrum var. grande Podp.; Bryum pseudotriquetrum var. lanatum Brid.; Bryum pseudotriquetrum var. lomense Podp.; Bryum pseudotriquetrum var. majus Schwägr.; Bryum ventricosum var. majus (Schwägr.) Schwägr.; Bryum pseudotriquetrum var. maritimum (Schimp. ex Warnst.) Podp.; Bryum ventricosum var. maritimum Schimp. ex Warnst.; Bryum pseudotriquetrum var. mughicola Podp.; Bryum pseudotriquetrum var. ovatum C.E.O. Jensen; Bryum pseudotriquetrum var. pilousii Podp.; Bryum pseudotriquetrum var. polytrichoides Corb.; Bryum ventricosum var. polytrichoides (Corb.) Warnst.; Bryum pseudotriquetrum var. pseudoschleicheri (J.J. Amann) Podp.; Bryum ventricosum subsp. pseudoschleicheri J.J. Amann; Bryum pseudotriquetrum var. rotundifolium J.E. Zetterst.; Bryum pseudotriquetrum var. tenue Velen.; Bryum pseudotriquetrum var. trevericum Podp.; Bryum pseudotriquetrum var. turfosum Podp.; Bryum pulchrirete Broth.; Bryum robustulum Müll. Hal.; Rhodobryum robustulum (Müll. Hal.) Paris; Bryum rosulatum J.J. Amann; Bryum rothii Warnst.; Bryum rubiginosum Hook. f. & Wilson; Bryum samuelssonii Thér.; Bryum semimarginatum Hampe; Bryum splachnoideum Müll. Hal.; Bryum squalidum Brid.; Mnium squalidum (Brid.) P. Beauv.; Bryum steffenii Dusén ex Herzog; Bryum strictifolium Dixon & Badhw.; Bryum subantarcticum Dixon; Bryum subintegridens Dixon; Bryum subobliquum Lindgr.; Bryum subsplachnobryoides Paris; Bryum subventricosum Broth.; Bryum tasmanicum Hampe; Bryum ventricosum Dicks.; Bryum ventricosum f. alpinum Podp.; Bryum ventricosum var. crassinervium Loeske; Bryum ventricosum var. flaccidum Jelenc; Bryum weberoides Cardot & Broth.; Hypnum ventricosum F. Weber & D. Mohr; Mnium pseudotriquetrum var. majus Schumach.; Webera racovitzae var. laxiretis Cardot

= Ptychostomum pseudotriquetrum =

Species of moss

Ptychostomum pseudotriquetrum, commonly known as marsh bryum, is a species of moss belonging to the family Bryaceae. It is distinguished by its strongly decurrent leaves that extend down the stem, central leaf stalks which may extend slightly beyond the tip of the leaf, dioicy, and long stems densely matted with rhizoids. It is found worldwide, excluding the tropics.

== Description ==
Ptychstomum pseudotriquem is a medium to large moss with an acrocarpous growth form. It is a yellow-green moss that becomes red-brown with age. The stems occur in dense turfs. The stems usually grow to lengths of 2–4 cm but can be as short as 1 cm and long as 6 cm. The stems may be weakly comose (i.e. crowned with a tuft of soft leaves) or evenly foliate. The lower part of the stem is matted with papillose red-brown rhizoids. The stems branch sparingly by means of subfloral innovations, which are elongate and evenly foliate.

The leaves typically measure 2–3 mm in length, but may as short as 1 mm or as long as 4 mm. The leaves are glossy and green, red-green, or yellow-green when young. They become dull brown-red or brick-red with age. They are twisted and contorted when dry. When moist, they are erect spreading, oblong‑lanceolate to ovate‑lanceolate, and flat to weakly concave. This means that the leaves are widest near the base and taper to a point. The leaves' cell walls are firm to incrassate and sometimes porose. The reddish basal cells are rectangular. The distal cells are rhomboidal-hexagonal to hexagonal, with a length of 20–40 μm and a width of 12–20 μm. The leaves are bordered by 2–3 rows of narrow, thick-walled, usually red cells. The leaf margins are revolute (i.e. rolled downward) from the base of the blade to the middle of the leaf or further. Near the apex, the leaf margins are denticulate (i.e. having fine teeth). The stout red-brown costa, or central stalk of the leaf, is percurrent to slightly excurrent, meaning it extends beyond the end of the apex, ending in a smooth awn. The leaf base is narrow and strongly decurrent, extending far down the stem.

Some populations in the Northern Hemisphere can reproduce asexually by means of brown gemmae in the leaf axils. The plants are dioicous, having male and female sexual organs on separate plants. The seta, or capsule stalk, is usually 1–3 cm long, though infrequently as long as 4 cm. The seta is red, becoming browner with age. The capsule, which contains the spores, is 3–5 mm long and brown but with a yellow mouth. The capsule is thickened at its distal end, with its shape being variously described as "elongate-ovate" (i.e. having an elongated egg shape), "cylindrical to clavate" (i.e. club-shaped), and "broadly pyriform" (i.e. pear-shaped). It is either pendulous or inclined. The diplolepidous peristome is composed of two sets of teeth, an inner endostome and an outer exostome, which ring the mouth of the capsule. The exostome teeth are orange- or yellow-brown to pale yellow and papillose at the tips. The yellowish hyaline (i.e. translucent) endostome teeth are lightly papillose, have broad perforations, and have a membrane at the base that is half the height of the exostome teeth. Attached to the endostome cells are 2–3 long, filiform (i.e. threadlike), appendiculate cilia. The operculum (the cap of the capsule) is 0.5–0.8 mm long and conic-apiculate, ending in a sharp point. The pale yellow or green spores measure 12–18 μm in diameter and are finely papillose. The capsules mature in the summer or fall, in the Northern Hemisphere from April to October.

== Taxonomy ==
Bryum pseudotriquetrum is a synonym of Ptychostomum pseudotriquetrum.

Ptychostomum bimum has historically been treated as a synoicous form of Ptychostomum pseudotriquetrum. P. bimum has twice as many chromosomes as and probably evolved from P. pseudotriquetrum As of June 2024, World Flora Online treats the two species as separate. Compared to P. pseudotriquetrum, P. bimum has a shorter stem and significantly shorter leaf decurrencies.

== Distribution and habitat ==
P. pseudotriquetrum has a bipolar distribution and is additionally found in temperate regions in the Southern Hemisphere. It is found on all continents, including Antarctica, but is largely absent from the tropics, subtropics, and islands in the central Pacific Ocean. It grows on rocks and wet soil by streams and lakes and in fens, wet heaths, and marshes. at elevations of 0–4000 m.
