= Weissia ovalis =

Scientific classification
- Kingdom: Plantae
- Division: Bryophyta
- Class: Bryopsida
- Subclass: Dicranidae
- Order: Pottiales
- Family: Pottiaceae
- Genus: Weissia
- Species: W. ovalis

Binomial name
- Weissia ovalis E.B.Bartram (1933)

Species of plant

Weissia ovalis is a species of moss in the Pottiaceae family.

== Distribution ==
Weissia ovalis is known only from the islands of Hawaii.
