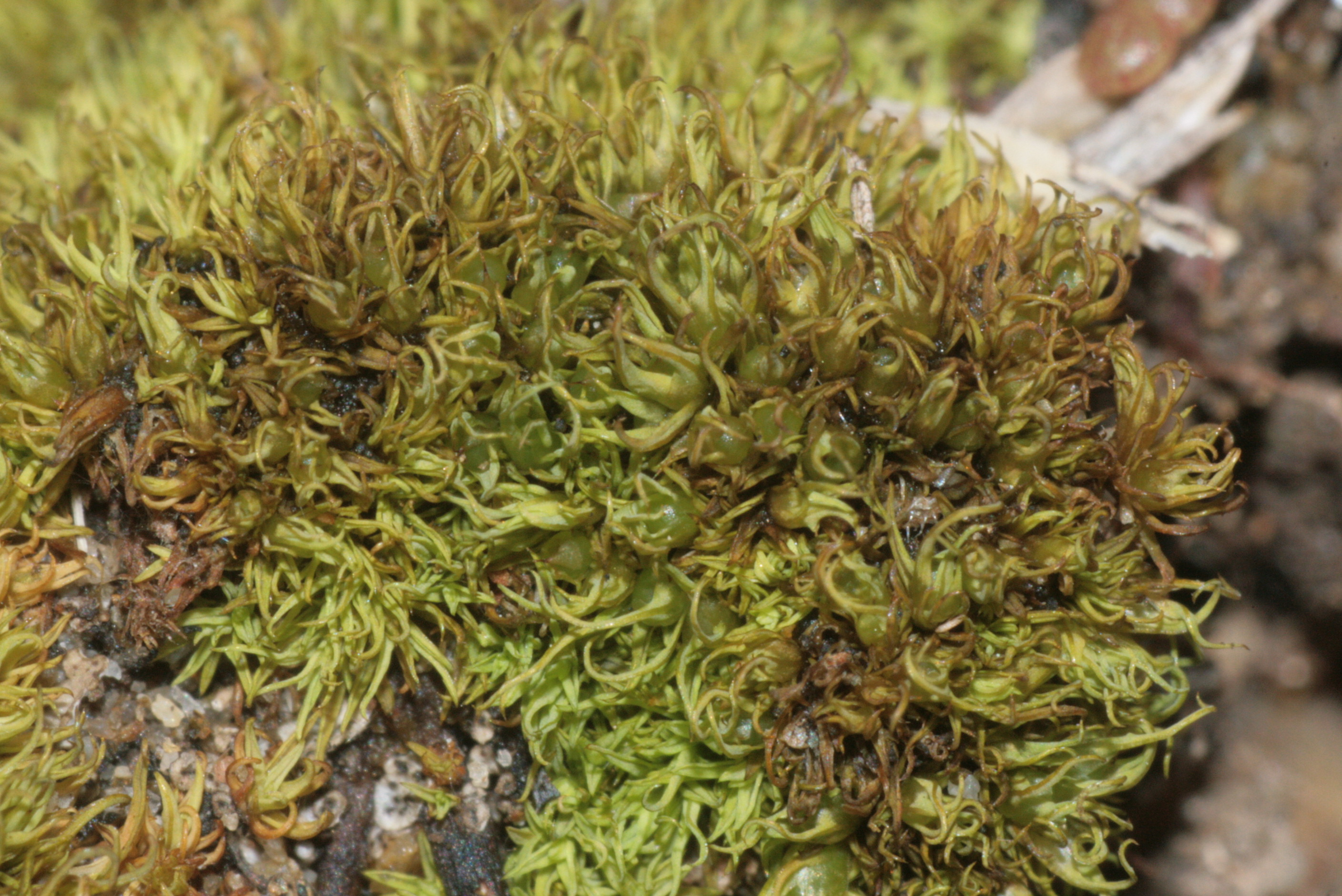
- Weissia longifolia

Scientific classification
- Kingdom: Plantae
- Division: Bryophyta
- Class: Bryopsida
- Subclass: Dicranidae
- Order: Pottiales
- Family: Pottiaceae
- Genus: Weissia; Hedw.

= Weissia =

Genus of mosses

Weissia is a genus of mosses, belonging to the family Pottiaceae.

The genus was described in 1801 by Johann Hedwig and the latest additions to the genus were in 1995 when Weissia ovatifolia and Weissia patula were added. As of July 2021, the genus contains 91 species.

Selected species:

- Weissia crispula
- Weissia controversa
- Weissia brachycarpa
- Weissia microstoma
- Weissia squarrosa
- Weissia xylopiae Bat. & M.P.Herrera

== Species ==
The genus Weissia contains the following species:

- Weissia abbreviata Zander, 1993
- Weissia alianuda B. C. Tan in B. Thiers, 1992
- Weissia andersoniana Zander, 1985
- Weissia argentinica C. Müller, 1879
- Weissia artocosana Zander, 1993
- Weissia atra Schleicher ex A. P. de Candolle, 1815
- Weissia ayresii W. P. Schimper in Bescherelle, 1880
- Weissia balansae Zander, 1993
- Weissia balansaeana C. Müller, 1882
- Weissia bizotii Zander, 1993
- Weissia brachycarpa Juratzka, 1882
- Weissia brachypelma C. Müller, 1879
- Weissia brachypoma C. C. Townsend, 1981 [1982]
- Weissia breutelii C. Müller, 1849
- Weissia breviseta Chen Pan-chieh, 1941
- Weissia canaliculata Hampe, 1879
- Weissia condensa Lindberg, 1863
- Weissia contermina Mitten, 1869
- Weissia controversa Hedwig, 1801
- Weissia cucullata C. Müller, 1858
- Weissia dieterlenii Thériot, 1924
- Weissia diffidentia Zander, 1993
- Weissia edentula Mitten, 1859
- Weissia erythrogona Bridel, 1806
- Weissia exserta Chen Pan-chieh, 1941
- Weissia fallax Sehlmeyer, 1820
- Weissia felipponei Thériot in Felippone, 1930
- Weissia fornicata Bridel, 1819 [1818]
- Weissia ghatensis Dixon & Potier de la Varde, 1930
- Weissia glazioui Zander, 1993
- Weissia groenlandica Kindberg, 1897
- Weissia humicola C. Müller, 1899
- Weissia inoperculata H. Crum, Steere & L. E. Anderson, 1964
- Weissia jamaicensis Grout, 1938
- Weissia kaikouraensis R. Brown ter, 1903
- Weissia krassavinii Lazarenko ex Ochyra, 1988
- Weissia kunzeana C. Müller, 1849
- Weissia latifolia (Dickson) Bruch & W. P. Schimper, 1843
- Weissia latiuscula C. Müller, 1899
- Weissia levieri Kindberg, 1897
- Weissia ligulaefolia Grout, 1938
- Weissia lineaefolia C. Müller, 1875
- Weissia longidens Cardot, 1907
- Weissia longifolia Mitten, 1851
- Weissia lorentzii Zander, 1993
- Weissia ludoviciana W. D. Reese & B. A. E. Lemmon, 1965
- Weissia macrospora Cardot & Potier de la Varde in Potier de la Varde, 1922
- Weissia micacea C. Müller, 1849
- Weissia mittenii Mitten, 1851
- Weissia muhlenbergiana W. D. Reese & B. A. E. Lemmon, 1965
- Weissia multicapsularis Mitten, 1851
- Weissia neocaledonica Zander, 1993
- Weissia newcomeri K. Saito, 1975
- Weissia nitida Reinwardt & Hornschuch, 1829
- Weissia norkettii R. S. Chopra, 1975
- Weissia novae-valisiae Stone, 1980
- Weissia obtusata C. Müller, 1900
- Weissia obtusifolia C. Müller, 1845
- Weissia occidentalis Stoneburner, 1985 [1986]
- Weissia occulta Wallroth, 1840
- Weissia opaca Magill in Magill & Schelpe, 1979
- Weissia ovalis E. B. Bartram, 1933
- Weissia ovatifolia Kürschner, 1995
- Weissia papillosa Dixon & Naveau, 1927
- Weissia patagonica Cardot & Brotherus, 1923
- Weissia patula Fife, 1995
- Weissia perpusilla Stone, 1980
- Weissia pilifera (Dickson) Funck ex Wallroth, 1831
- Weissia platystegia A. Eddy, n.d. [1990]
- Weissia ricciae Bridel, 1819 [1818]
- Weissia riograndensis Zander, 1993
- Weissia rostellata Lindberg, 1864
- Weissia rutilans Lindberg, 1863
- Weissia semidiaphana Zander, 1985
- Weissia semiinvoluta C. Müller, 1882
- Weissia semipallida C. Müller, 1898
- Weissia sharpii L. E. Anderson & B. A. E. Lemmon, 1973
- Weissia simplex Bridel, 1827
- Weissia socotrana Mitten, 1888
- Weissia splachnum Garovaglio, 1840
- Weissia squarrosa C. Müller, 1849
- Weissia sterilis W. E. Nicholson, 1903
- Weissia subacaulis Mitten, 1869
- Weissia submicacea C. Müller, 1900
- Weissia termitidarum C. Müller, 1875
- Weissia triumphans M. O. Hill, 1981 [1982]
- Weissia tyrrhena Fleischer, 1893
- Weissia vardei Bizot in Bizot & Dury, 1978
- Weissia veviridis Zander, 1993
- Weissia welwitschii W. P. Schimper, 1876
- Weissia willisiana Catcheside, 1980
