= Weissia microstoma =

Scientific classification
- Kingdom: Plantae
- Division: Bryophyta
- Class: Bryopsida
- Subclass: Dicranidae
- Order: Pottiales
- Family: Pottiaceae
- Genus: Weissia
- Species: W. microstoma

Binomial name
- Weissia microstoma Hornsch. ex Nees & Hornsch.

Species of moss

Weissia microstoma is a species of moss belonging to the family Pottiaceae.

Synonym:

- Hymenostomum brachycarpum Nees & Hornsch.
