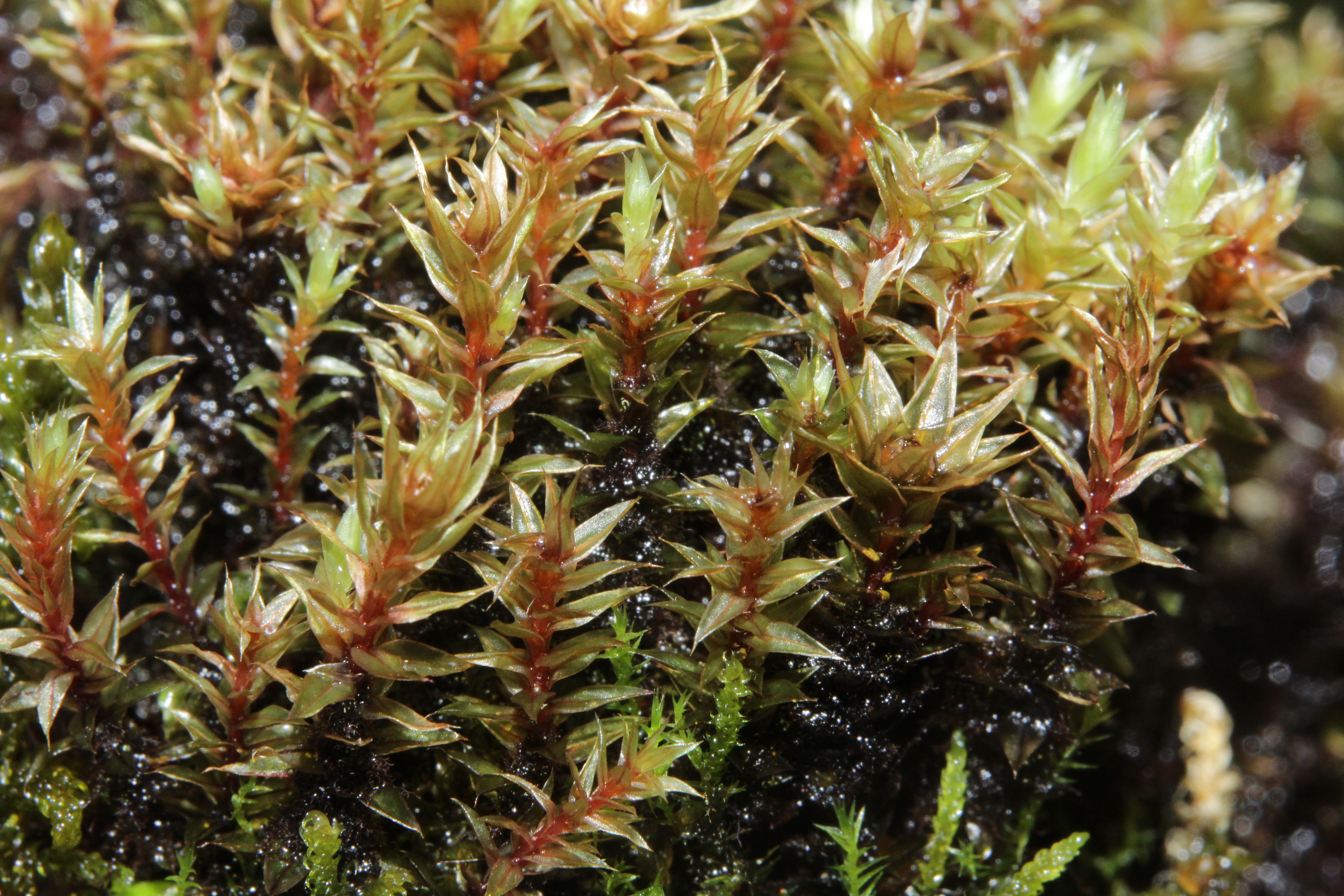
- Ptychostomum pseudotriquetrum

Scientific classification
- Kingdom: Plantae
- Division: Bryophyta
- Class: Bryopsida
- Subclass: Bryidae
- Order: Bryales
- Family: Bryaceae
- Genus: Ptychostomum; Hornsch.

= Ptychostomum =

Genus of mosses

Ptychostomum is a genus of mosses belonging to the family Bryaceae. It has an almost cosmopolitan distribution. It has two subgenera, Psychostomum (Ptychostomum) and Psychostomum (Cladodium).

== Species ==
The following species are recognised in the genus Ptychostomum:

- Ptychostomum acutiforme (Limpr.) J.R. Spence
- Ptychostomum altisetum (Müll.Hal.) J.R.Spence & H.P.Ramsay
- Ptychostomum amblyodon (Müll. Hal.) Chen Y. Wang & J.C. Zhao
- Ptychostomum angustifolium (Brid.) J.R.Spence & H.P.Ramsay
- Ptychostomum archangelicum (Bruch & Schimp.) J.R. Spence
- Ptychostomum arcticum (R. Br.) J.R. Spence
- Ptychostomum austriacum (Köckinger, Holyoak & Suanjak) D. Bell & Holyoak
- Ptychostomum badium (Bruch ex Brid.) J.R.Spence
- Ptychostomum bimum (Schreb.) J.R. Spence
- Ptychostomum bornholmense (Wink. & R. Ruthe) Holyoak & N. Pedersen
- Ptychostomum bryoides (R.Br.) J.R.Spence
- Ptychostomum calophyllum (R. Br.) J.R. Spence
- Ptychostomum cellulare (Hook.) D. Bell & Holyoak
- Ptychostomum cernuum (Hedw.) Hornsch.
- Ptychostomum chorizodontum (Cardot & Broth.) J.R. Spence
- Ptychostomum compactum Hornsch.
- Ptychostomum creberrimum (Taylor) J.R. Spence & H.P. Ramsay
- Ptychostomum cryophilum (Mårtensson) J.R. Spence
- Ptychostomum cyclophyllum (Schwägr.) J.R. Spence
- Ptychostomum cylindrothecium (R. Br. bis) J.R. Spence & H.P. Ramsay
- Ptychostomum dicarpum (E.B. Bartram) J.R. Spence
- Ptychostomum donianum (Grev.) Holyoak & N. Pedersen
- Ptychostomum elegans (Nees ex Brid.) D. Bell & Holyoak
- Ptychostomum funkii (Schwägr.) J.R. Spence
- Ptychostomum hawaiicum (Hoe) J.R. Spence
- Ptychostomum imbricatulum (Müll. Hal.) Holyoak & N. Pedersen
- Ptychostomum inclinatum (Sw. ex Brid.) J.R.Spence
- Ptychostomum intermedium (Brid.) J.R. Spence
- Ptychostomum knowltonii (Barnes) J.R. Spence
- Ptychostomum lamprochaete (Dusén) J.R. Spence
- Ptychostomum lonchocaulon (Müll. Hal.) J.R. Spence
- Ptychostomum longisetum (Blandow ex Schwägr.) J.R. Spence
- Ptychostomum marratii (Hook. & Wilson) J. R. Spence
- Ptychostomum meesioides (Kindb.) J.R. Spence
- Ptychostomum minii (Podp. ex Guim.) D.Bell & Holyoak
- Ptychostomum moravicum (Podp.) Ros & Mazimpaka
- Ptychostomum neodamense (Itzigs.) J.R. Spence
- Ptychostomum nitidulum (Lindb.) J.R. Spence
- Ptychostomum ovatum (Hedw.) J.R.Spence
- Ptychostomum pacificum J.R. Spence & Shevock
- Ptychostomum pallens (Sw.) J.R. Spence
- Ptychostomum pallescens (Schleich. ex Schwägr.) J.R. Spence
- Ptychostomum pauperculum (E.B. Bartram) J.R. Spence
- Ptychostomum pendulum Hornsch.
- Ptychostomum pseudotriquetrum (Hedw.) J.R. Spence & H.P. Ramsay ex Holyoak & N. Pedersen
- Ptychostomum reedii (H. Rob.) J.R. Spence
- Ptychostomum rubens (Mitt.) Holyoak & N. Pedersen
- Ptychostomum rutilans (Brid.) J.R. Spence
- Ptychostomum salinum (I. Hagen ex Limpr.) J.R. Spence
- Ptychostomum schleicheri (DC.) J.R. Spence
- Ptychostomum sibiricum (Lindb. & Arnell) J.R. Spence
- Ptychostomum subneodamense (Kindb.) J.R. Spence
- Ptychostomum torquescens (Bruch & Schimp.) Ros & Mazimpaka
- Ptychostomum touwii Bijlsma, Kruijer & M. Stech
- Ptychostomum turbinatum (Hedw.) J.R. Spence
- Ptychostomum vermigerum (Arnell & C.E.O. Jensen) J.R. Spence
- Ptychostomum vernicosum (Dusén) J.R. Spence
- Ptychostomum warneum (Schwägr. ex Steud.) J.R. Spence
- Ptychostomum weigelii (Biehler) J.R.Spence
- Ptychostomum wrightii (Sull. & Lesq.) J.R. Spence
