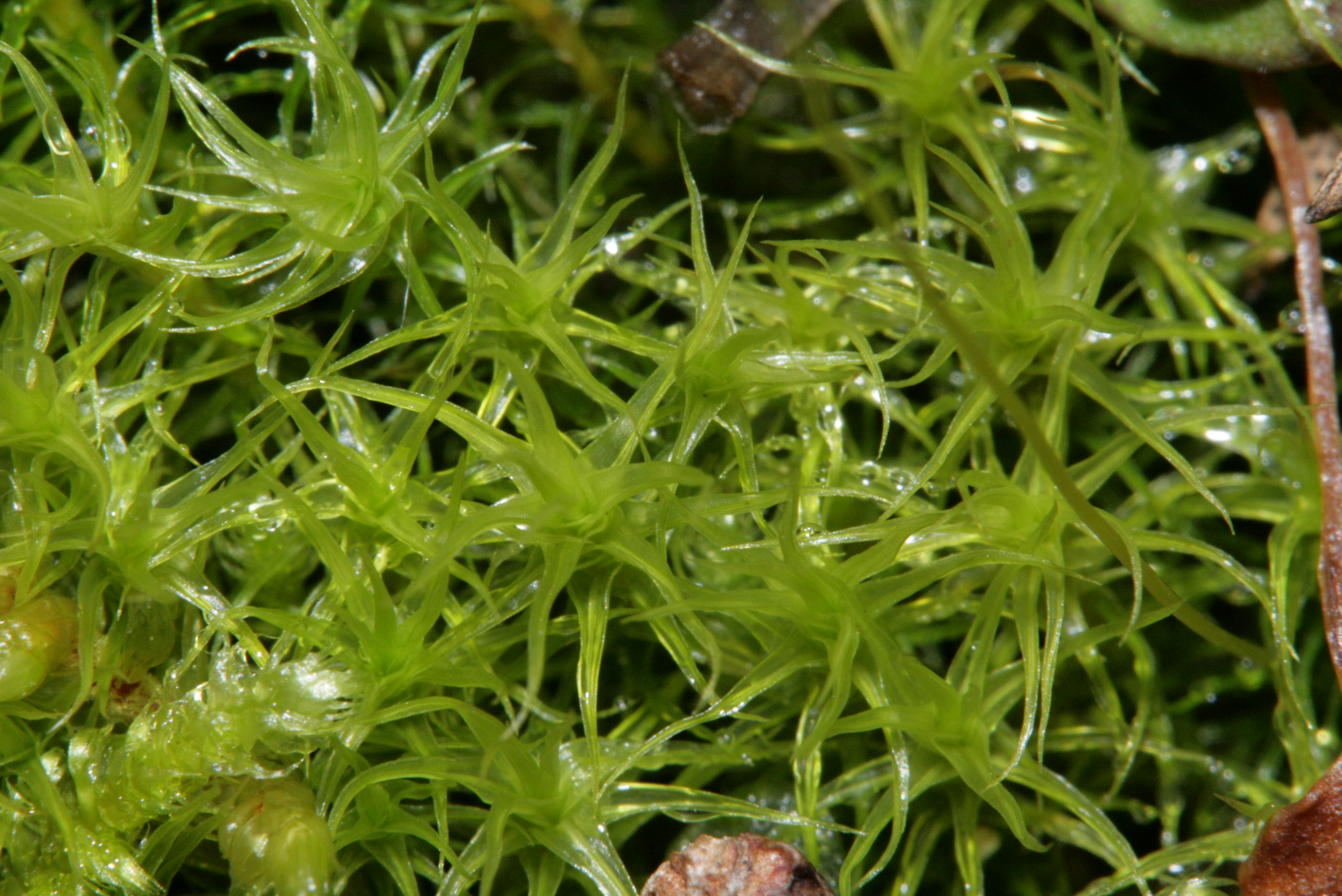

Conservation status
- Secure (NatureServe)

Scientific classification
- Kingdom: Plantae
- Clade: Embryophytes
- Division: Bryophyta
- Class: Bryopsida
- Subclass: Dicranidae
- Order: Dicranales
- Family: Dicranaceae
- Genus: Oncophorus
- Species: O. virens

Binomial name
- Oncophorus virens Hedw.

Synonyms
- Cynodontium virens (Hedw.) (Schimp.); Oncophorus virens var. nigrescens Williams; Oncophorus virens var. serratus (Bruch & Schimp.) Braithw.; Dicranum virens (Hedw.)

= Oncophorus virens =

Species of moss

Oncophorus virens is a species of moss in the genus Oncophorus with a wide, circumpolar distribution across the Northern Hemisphere.
