= Ptychostomum knowltonii =

Scientific classification
- Kingdom: Plantae
- Division: Bryophyta
- Class: Bryopsida
- Subclass: Bryidae
- Order: Bryales
- Family: Bryaceae
- Genus: Ptychostomum
- Subgenus: Ptychostomum subg. Cladodium
- Species: P. knowltonii

Binomial name
- Ptychostomum knowltonii (Barnes) J.R.Spence, 2005

Synonyms
- Bryum knowltonii Barnes, 1889

Species of moss

Ptychostomum knowltonii is a species of moss belonging to the family Bryaceae. Its green leaves are ovate and strongly concave.

It is native to Northern Hemisphere.
