= Ptychostomum warneum =

Scientific classification
- Kingdom: Plantae
- Division: Bryophyta
- Class: Bryopsida
- Subclass: Bryidae
- Order: Bryales
- Family: Bryaceae
- Genus: Ptychostomum
- Subgenus: Ptychostomum subg. Ptychostomum
- Species: P. warneum

Binomial name
- Ptychostomum warneum (Schwägr. ex Steud.) J.R. Spence

Synonyms
- Bryum mamillatum Lind.; Bryum oelandicum H. Philib.; Bryum warneum (Röhl.) Brid.

Species of moss

Ptychostomum warneum, known as sea bryum or Warne's threadmoss, is a protected moss found in sandy coastal areas in temperate regions of Europe (including Iceland) and is also recorded to have been found in the Himalaya, the Altai Mountains and in Quebec, Canada.

It is a pioneer species intolerant of both shade and trampling.

Generally forming dense clusters of plants with one-centimetre stems with small, hanging capsules in which spores are produced and, upon maturity, emitted.
