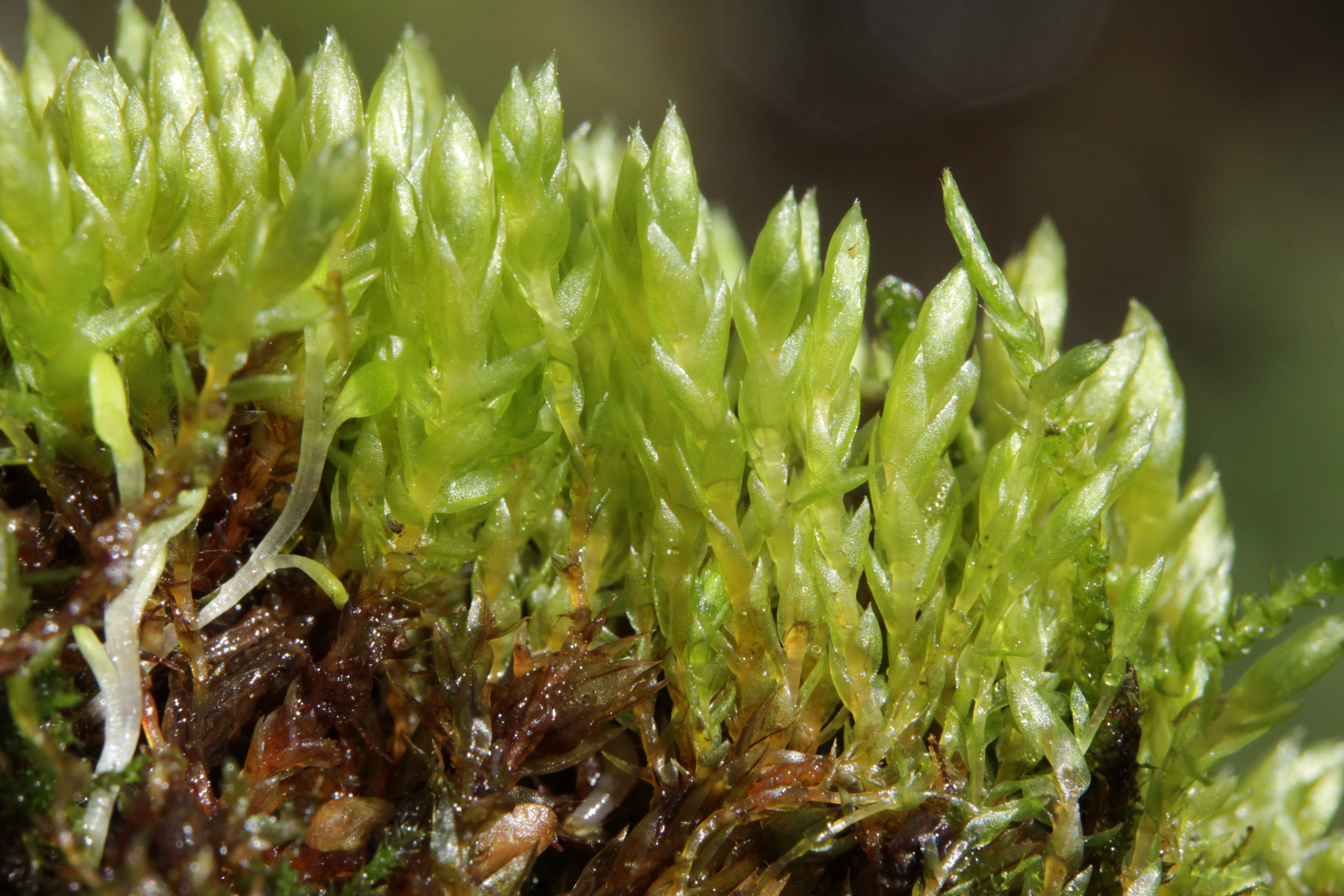

Scientific classification
- Kingdom: Plantae
- Division: Bryophyta
- Class: Bryopsida
- Subclass: Bryidae
- Order: Bryales
- Family: Bryaceae
- Genus: Ptychostomum
- Subgenus: Ptychostomum subg. Ptychostomum
- Species: P. schleicheri

Binomial name
- Ptychostomum schleicheri (DC.) J.R. Spence

= Ptychostomum schleicheri =

Species of moss

Ptychostomum schleicheri, the Schleicher's bryum moss, is a species of moss belonging to the family Bryaceae. The leaves' color ranges from yellow to yellow-copper.

It is native to the Northern Hemisphere.
