= Weissia squarrosa =

Conservation status
- Vulnerable (IUCN 3.1)

Scientific classification
- Kingdom: Plantae
- Division: Bryophyta
- Class: Bryopsida
- Subclass: Dicranidae
- Order: Pottiales
- Family: Pottiaceae
- Genus: Weissia
- Species: W. squarrosa

Binomial name
- Weissia squarrosa (Nees & Hornsch.) Müll.Hal.

Species of moss

Weissia squarrosa is a species of moss belonging to the family Pottiaceae.

It is native to Europe.
