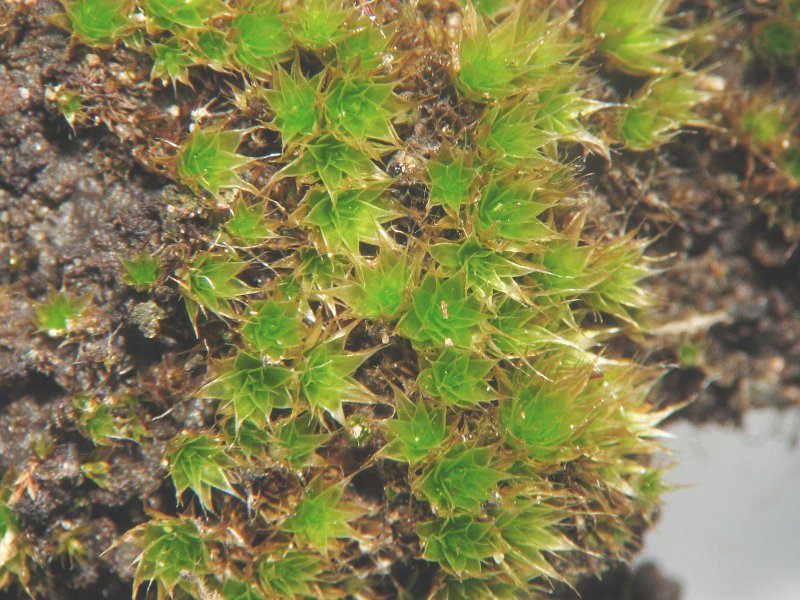

Scientific classification
- Kingdom: Plantae
- Clade: Embryophytes
- Division: Bryophyta
- Class: Bryopsida
- Subclass: Bryidae
- Order: Bryales
- Family: Bryaceae
- Genus: Ptychostomum
- Species: P. imbricatulum

Binomial name
- Ptychostomum imbricatulum (Müll.Hal.) Holyoak & N.Pedersen

Synonyms
- Gemmabryum caespiticium (Hedw.) J.R.Spence

= Ptychostomum imbricatulum =

Species of moss

Ptychostomum imbricatulum, handbell moss, is a species of moss belonging to the family Bryaceae.

It has almost cosmopolitan distribution.

Ptychostomum imbricatulum is known to be able to use artificial light to grow in places which are otherwise devoid of natural light, such as Crystal Cave in Wisconsin.
