= Weissia sterilis =

Conservation status
- Near Threatened (IUCN 3.1)

Scientific classification
- Kingdom: Plantae
- Division: Bryophyta
- Class: Bryopsida
- Subclass: Dicranidae
- Order: Pottiales
- Family: Pottiaceae
- Genus: Weissia
- Species: W. sterilis

Binomial name
- Weissia sterilis (Nees & Hornsch.) Müll.Hal.

Species of moss

Weissia sterilis is a species of moss in the family Pottiaceae. It is found in lowland grasslands in Europe, mainly France and Great Britain. It is classified as a near-threatened species due to habitat degradation, decreasing population size, extensive ploughing and the cessation of grazing.
