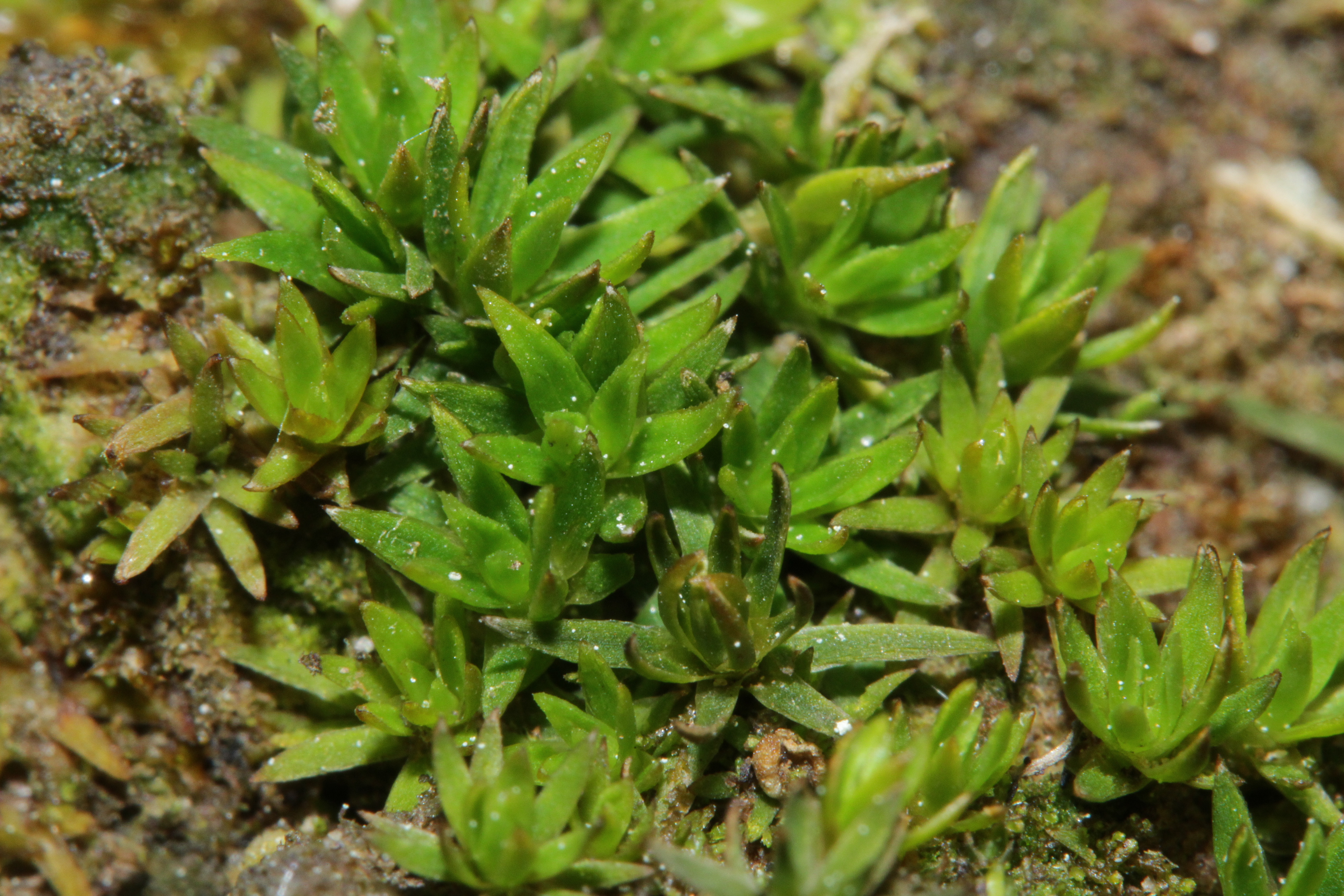

Scientific classification
- Kingdom: Plantae
- Division: Bryophyta
- Class: Polytrichopsida
- Order: Polytrichales
- Family: Polytrichaceae
- Genus: Pogonatum
- Species: P. nanum

Binomial name
- Pogonatum nanum Palisot de Beauvois, 1805

= Pogonatum nanum =

Species of moss

Pogonatum nanum is a species of moss belonging to the family Polytrichaceae.

It is native to Europe.
