= Weissia multicapsularis =

Conservation status
- Data Deficient (IUCN 3.1)

Scientific classification
- Kingdom: Plantae
- Division: Bryophyta
- Class: Bryopsida
- Subclass: Dicranidae
- Order: Pottiales
- Family: Pottiaceae
- Genus: Weissia
- Species: W. multicapsularis

Binomial name
- Weissia multicapsularis (Sm.) Mitt.

Species of plant

Weissia multicapsularis, the many-fruited beardless-moss, is an ephemeral moss. It is critically endangered.

== Distribution ==
It is found in France, Cornwall, Wales, and Turkey. It grows on damp and muddy non-calcareous soils. It is found on banks hedges, and tracksides.

== Taxonomy ==
It was named by William Mitten, in Ann. Mag. Nat. History, ser. 2 8: 317 in 1851.
