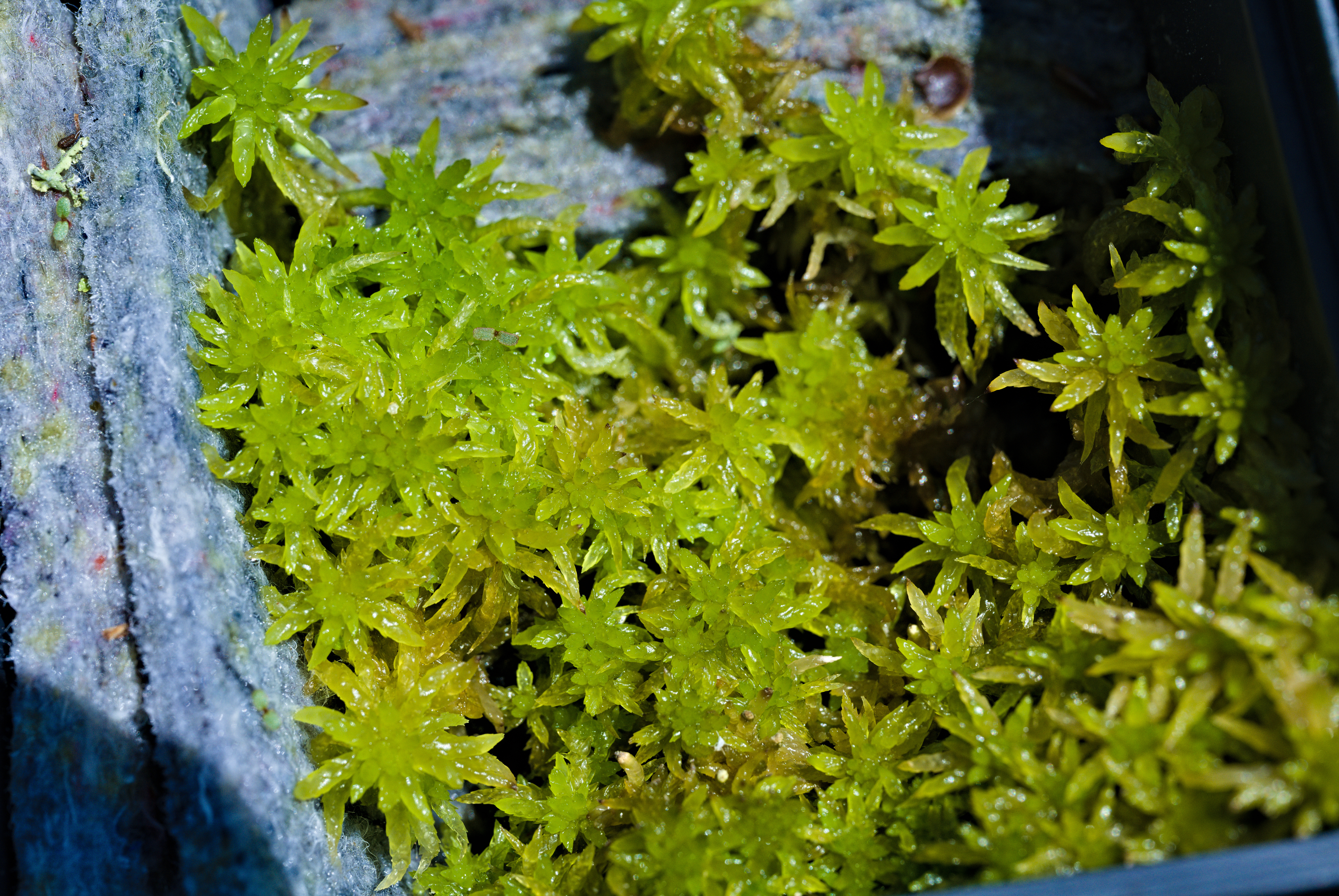

Scientific classification
- Kingdom: Plantae
- Division: Bryophyta
- Class: Sphagnopsida
- Order: Sphagnales
- Family: Sphagnaceae
- Genus: Sphagnum
- Species: S. denticulatum

Binomial name
- Sphagnum denticulatum Bridel, 1826

= Sphagnum denticulatum =

Species of moss

Sphagnum denticulatum is a species of moss belonging to the family Sphagnaceae. It is widely distributed in Europe but it is also found in other parts of the world.

In a study of the effect of the herbicide Asulam on moss growth, Sphagnum denticulatum was shown to be the third most sensitive to the herbicide out of the 18 species tested. The study concluded that it was sensitive to Asulam exposure.
