= Peristome =

Type of anatomical feature

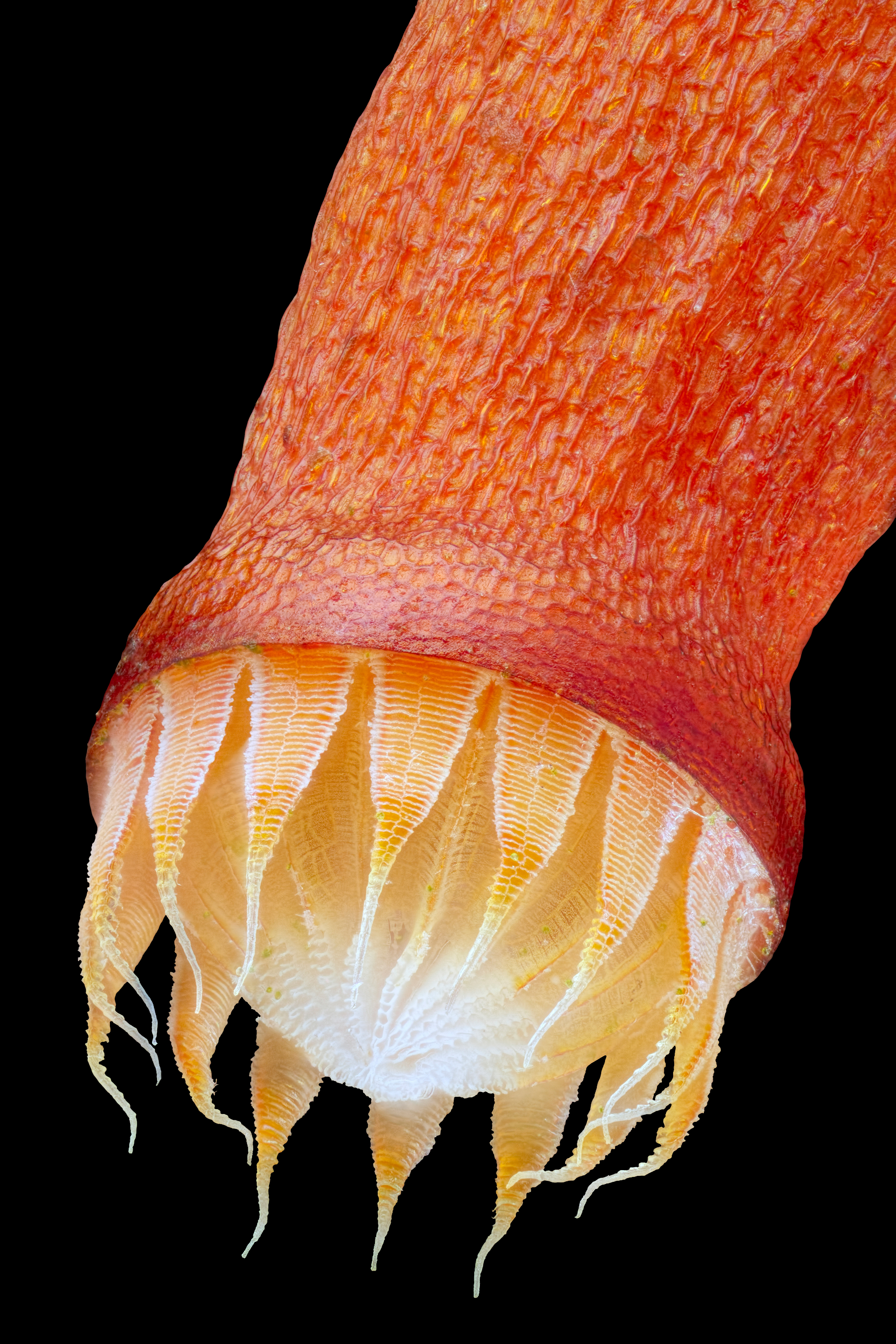
Peristome of Bryum capillare moss

Peristome (from the Greek peri, meaning 'around' or 'about', and stoma, 'mouth') is an anatomical feature that surrounds an opening to an organ or structure. Some plants, fungi, and shelled gastropods have peristomes.

== In mosses ==
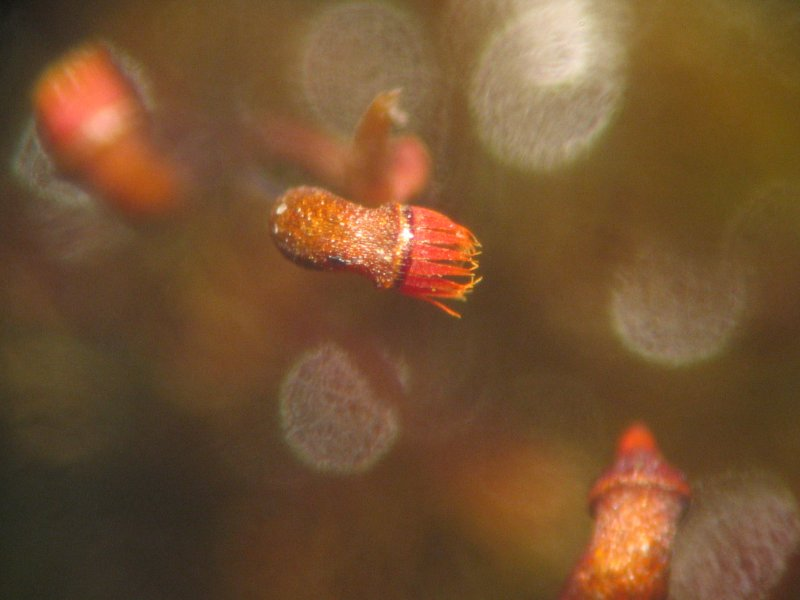
Arthrodontous capsule of Dicranella varia moss

In mosses, the peristome is a specialized structure in the sporangium that allows for gradual spore discharge, instead of releasing them all at once.

Most mosses produce a capsule with a lid (the operculum) which falls off when the spores inside are mature and thus ready to be dispersed. The opening thus revealed is called the stoma (meaning "mouth") and is surrounded by one or two peristomes. Each peristome is a ring of triangular "teeth" formed from the remnants of dead cells with thickened cell walls. There are usually 16 such teeth in a single peristome, separate from each other and able to both fold in to cover the stoma as well as fold back to open the stoma. This articulation of the teeth is termed arthrodontous and is found in the moss subclass Bryopsida. In other groups of mosses, the capsule is either nematodontous with an attached operculum (as in the Polytrichopsida), or else splits open without operculum or teeth.

There are two subtypes of arthrodontous peristome.

1. The first is termed haplolepidous and consists of a single circle of 16 peristome teeth.
2. The second type is the diplolepidous peristome found in subclass Bryidae. In this type, there are two rings of peristome teeth—an inner endostome (short for endoperistome) and an exostome. The endostome is a more delicate membrane, and its teeth are aligned between the teeth of the exostome. There are a few mosses in the Bryopsida that have no peristome in their capsules. These mosses still undergo the same cell division patterns in capsule development, but the teeth do not fully develop.

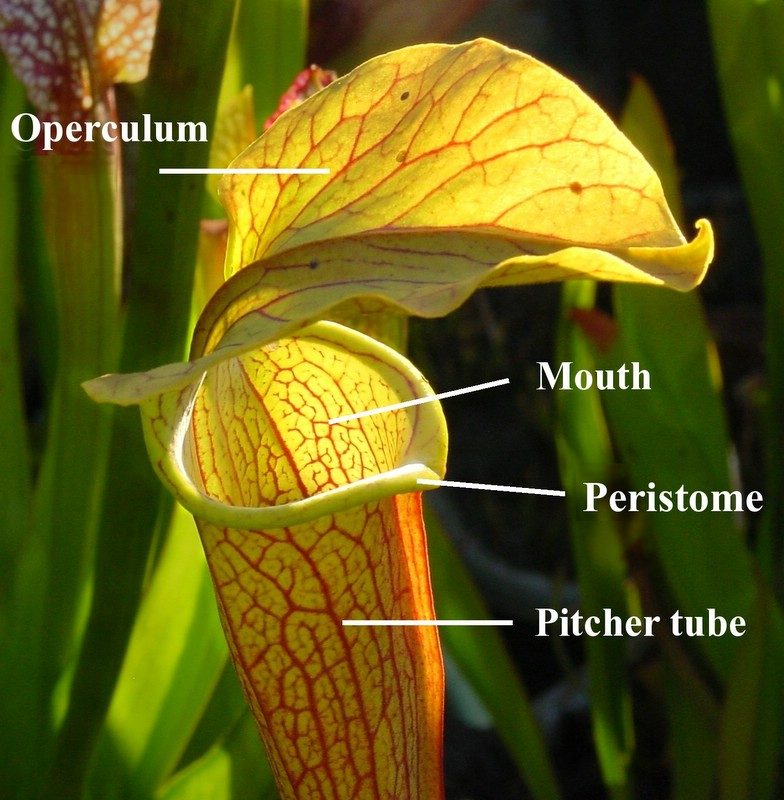
The location of the peristome on a Sarracenia (North American pitcher plant)

== In pitcher plants ==
In pitcher plants, the peristome is a reflexed ring (or partial ring) of tissue that surrounds the entrance to the digestive tube in these plants. It often (for example in Cephalotus and Nepenthes) possesses sharp, overhanging 'teeth' which aid in prey retention. It is often studded with nectar secreting glands, hence its popular name, nectar roll.

== In fungi ==
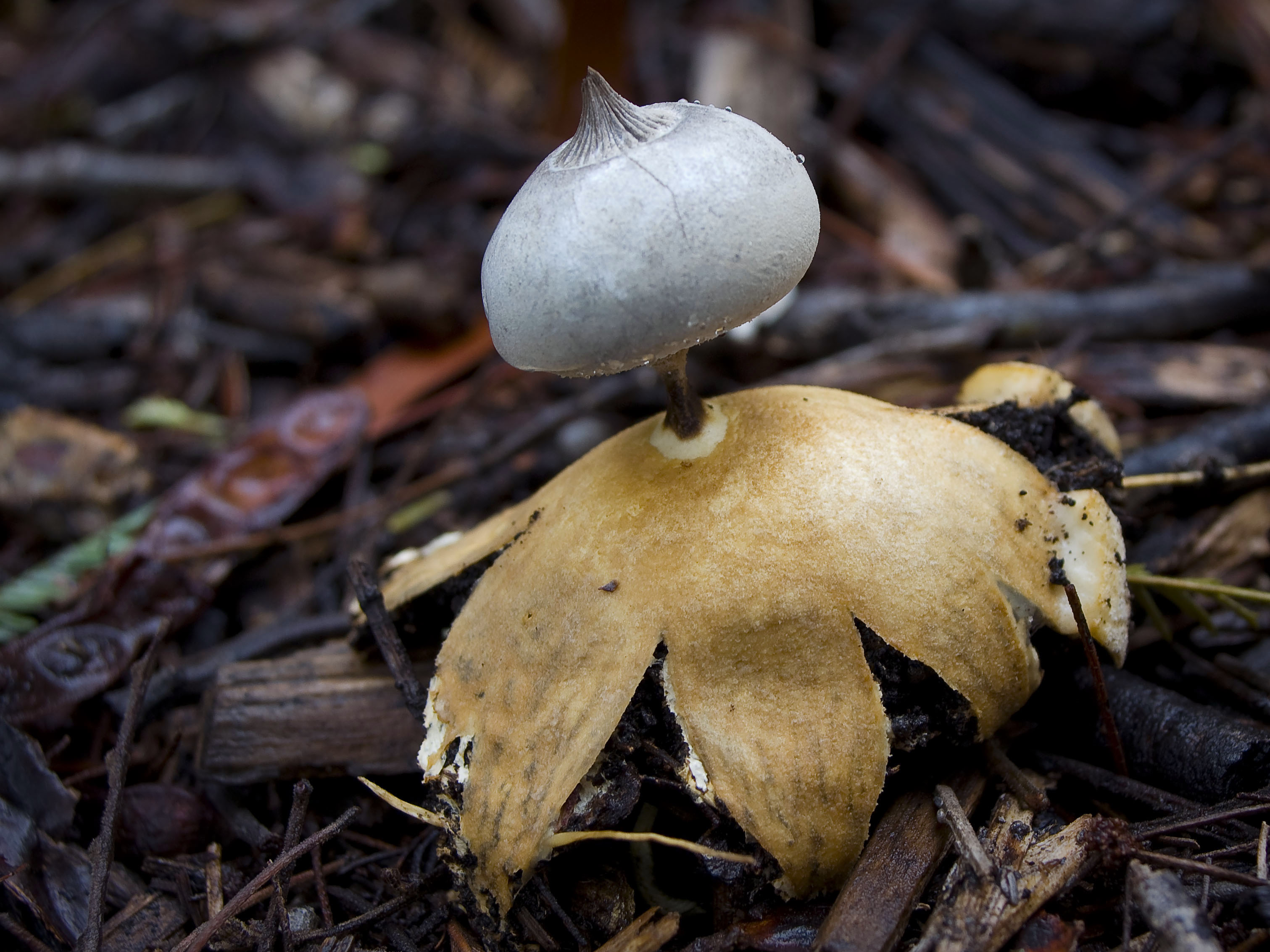
The earthstar Geastrum pectinatum showing a beaked peristome

The basidiocarps of some gasteroid fungi – such as puffballs and earthstars – release their spores through an opening on top (an apical opening) that is termed a peristome. In different fungal species, the peristome varies in its structural forms. The exact features of the peristome are often diagnostic when distinguishing closely related species.

== In shelled gastropods ==
The peristome is the margin of the aperture of a gastropod shell. It is the edge of the lip of the shell. This part is sometimes reflected (turned back) or thickened once the snail reaches adult size, and these qualities of the peristome can be diagnostic features of the shell which may aid in identification of the species.

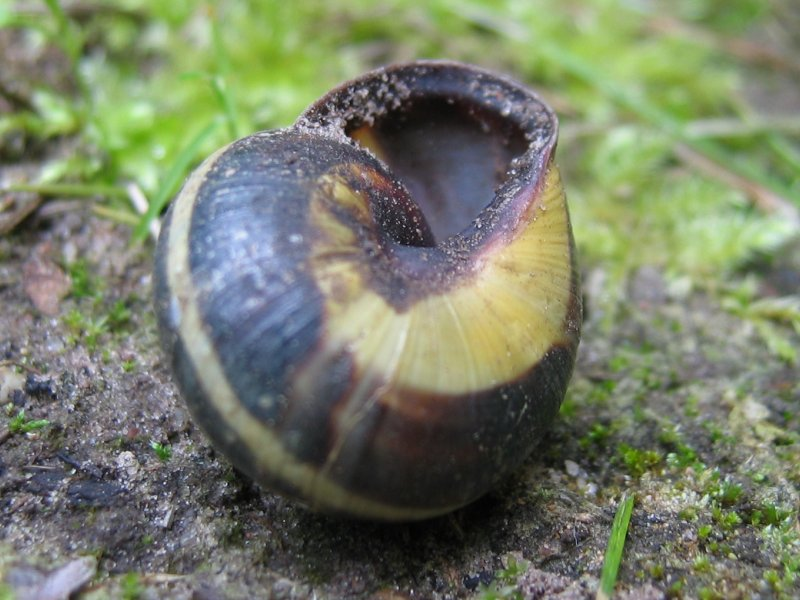
The ventral surface of a shell of Cepaea nemoralis. The peristome is thickened and dark in an adult snail.

== In other invertebrates ==
The peristome is any of the structures or sets of parts that surround the mouth or invertebrates such as echinoderms or earthworms.
