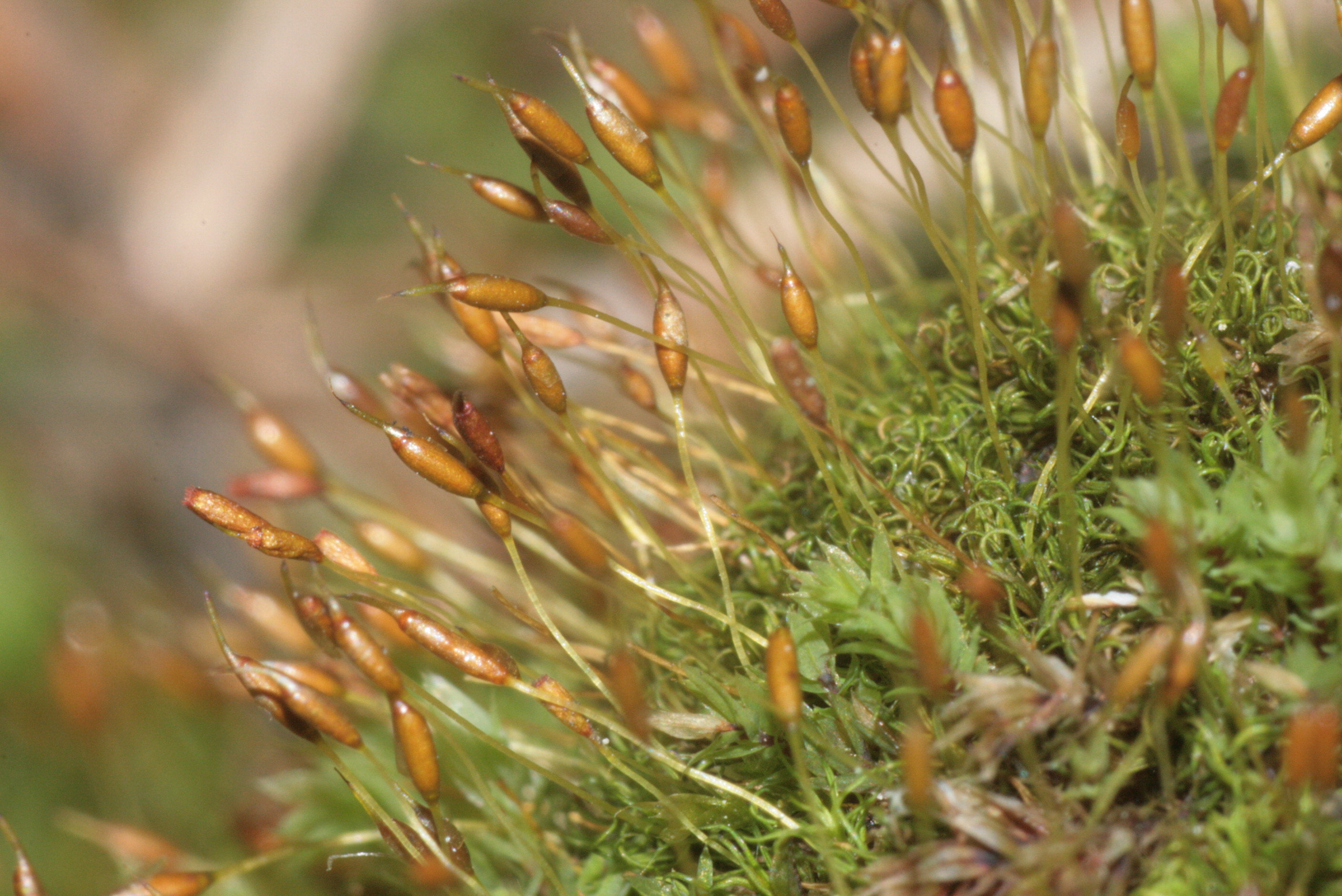

Conservation status
- Least Concern (IUCN 3.1)

Scientific classification
- Kingdom: Plantae
- Division: Bryophyta
- Class: Bryopsida
- Subclass: Dicranidae
- Order: Pottiales
- Family: Pottiaceae
- Genus: Weissia
- Species: W. controversa

Binomial name
- Weissia controversa Hedwig, 1801

= Weissia controversa =

Species of plant

Weissia controversa, the green-tufted stubble-moss, is a species of moss in the Pottiaceae family.

It is widely found on all continents, except in Antarctica. Weissia controversa is a hermaphroditic species. The plants usually grow to less than 1 cm in height and the spores measure 14–20 μm.
