= Ptychostomum funkii =

Scientific classification
- Kingdom: Plantae
- Clade: Embryophytes
- Division: Bryophyta
- Class: Bryopsida
- Subclass: Bryidae
- Order: Bryales
- Family: Bryaceae
- Genus: Ptychostomum
- Species: P. funkii

Binomial name
- Ptychostomum funkii (Schwägr.) J.R.Spence

Synonyms
- List: Bryum articulatum Sendtn.; Bryum confertum Limpr.; Bryum funkii Schwägr.; Bryum funckii Schwägr.; Bryum funkii subsp. rotundatum Podp.; Bryum funkii var. rotundatum (Podp.) Podp.; Bryum pertenerum Thér.; Bryum sempronianum H.Philib.; Bryum funkii subsp. confertum (Limpr.) Podp.; Bryum funkii subsp. tenue Boulay; Bryum garovaglii subsp. confertum (Limpr.) Kindb.; Bryum payotii var. tenue (Boulay) G.Roth; Bryum funkii var. tenue (Boulay) Husn.

Species of moss

Ptychostomum funkii is a species of moss belonging to the family Bryaceae.
