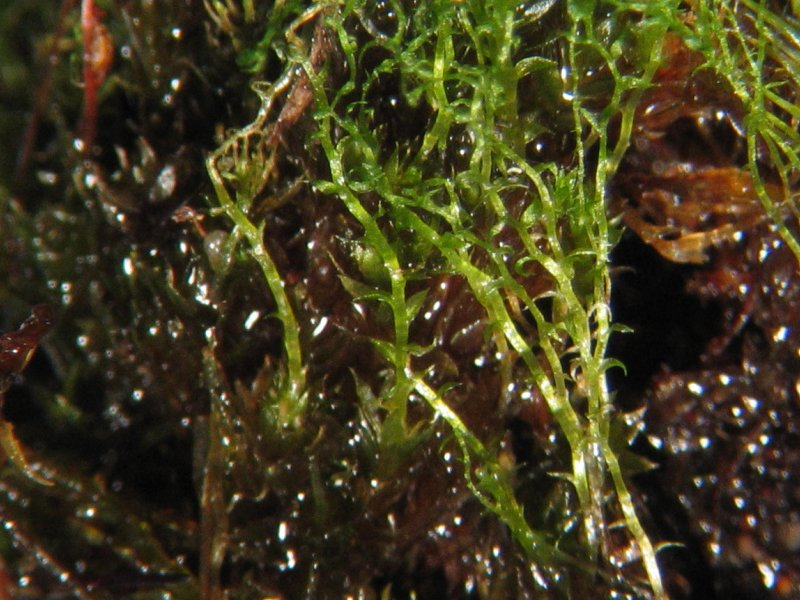
- Ptychostomum turbinatum in Germany in 2007

Scientific classification
- Kingdom: Plantae
- Division: Bryophyta
- Class: Bryopsida
- Subclass: Bryidae
- Order: Bryales
- Family: Bryaceae
- Genus: Ptychostomum
- Subgenus: Ptychostomum subg. Ptychostomum
- Species: P. turbinatum

Binomial name
- Ptychostomum turbinatum (Hedw.) J.R.Spence

Synonyms
- Bryum turbinatum (Hedw.) Turner

= Ptychostomum turbinatum =

Species of moss

Ptychostomum turbinatum, also known as topshape thread-moss or pear-fruited bryum, is a species of moss found in continental Europe and the US. The species became extinct across the British Isles in the 1940s according to the Species Recovery Trust and in 2001 according to the IUCN, and it has not reestablished since.

Splachnobryum kieneri is listed by the USDA as a synonym.

It grows on the edges of ditches and ponds, on calcareous, gravelly ground.

The leaves' color ranges from dull green to yellow-green.
