= Weissia levieri =

Conservation status
- Least Concern (IUCN 3.1)

Scientific classification
- Kingdom: Plantae
- Division: Bryophyta
- Class: Bryopsida
- Subclass: Dicranidae
- Order: Pottiales
- Family: Pottiaceae
- Genus: Weissia
- Species: W. levieri

Binomial name
- Weissia levieri Kindberg (1897)

Species of plant

Weissia levieri is a species of moss in the Pottiaceae family.

== Distribution ==
Weissia levieri is known from Eurasia and the Maghreb of North-Africa.
