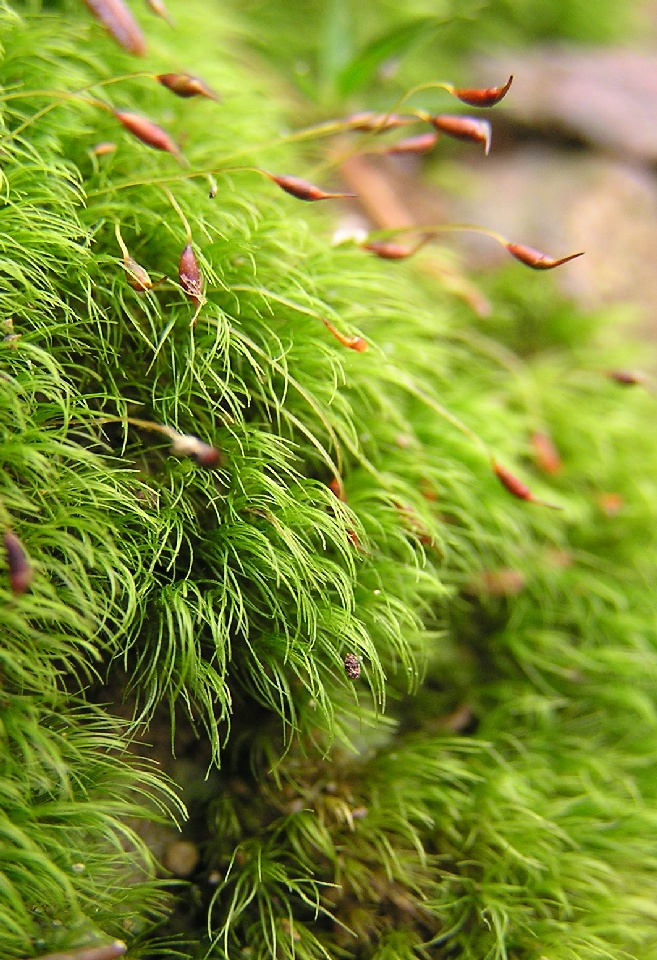
- Dicranella heteromalla

Scientific classification
- Kingdom: Plantae
- Division: Bryophyta
- Class: Bryopsida
- Subclass: Dicranidae
- Order: Dicranales
- Family: Dicranaceae
- Genus: Dicranella (Müll.Hal.) Schimp.

= Dicranella (plant) =

Genus of mosses

Dicranella is a genus of moss belonging to the family Dicranaceae. The genus was first described by Karl Müller. It has a cosmopolitan distribution.

Dicranella heteromalla is found to have a satisfactory holotype. Dicranella heteromalla possesses a structure designed to endure acidic environments. In addition, it has multipurpose systems that allow a satisfactory adaption. For example, the wild rhizoid system of D. heteromalla forms a dense, matted network of filaments of different diameters, which evidences that its major role is solute uptake rather than anchorage.

Dicranaceae (Dicranales), specifically D. heteromalla, appears to be an important moss host for B. fulva, a necrotrophic parasite that causes tissue bleaching.

Selected species:

- Dicranella acroclada Cardot, 1915
- Dicranella heteromalla (Hedw.) Schimp
- Dicranella lorentzii (previously known as Aongstroemia lorentzi)
- Dicranella staphylina Whitehouse, 1965
- Dicranella varia
