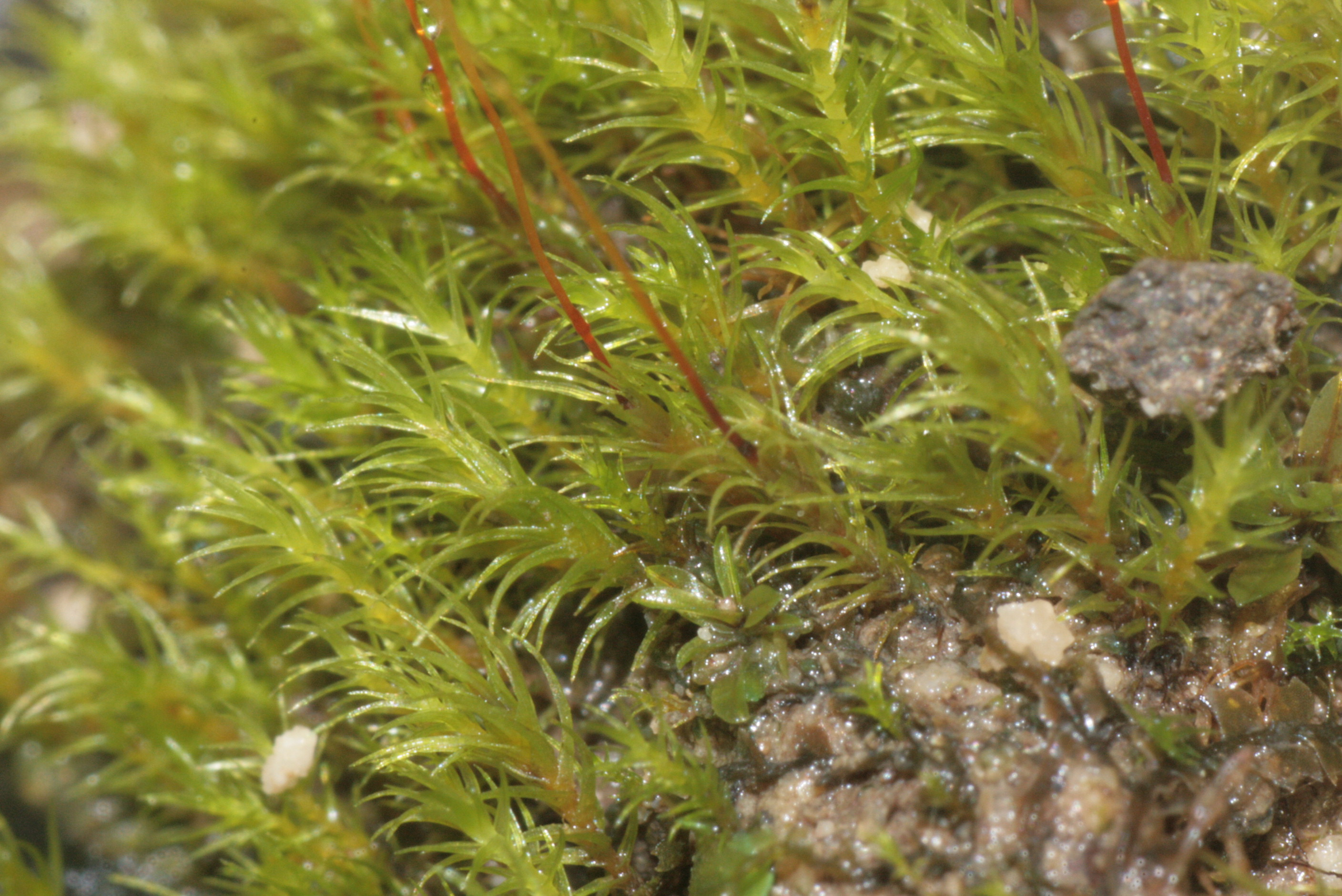

Scientific classification
- Kingdom: Plantae
- Division: Bryophyta
- Class: Bryopsida
- Subclass: Dicranidae
- Order: Dicranales
- Family: Dicranaceae
- Genus: Dicranella
- Species: D. varia

Binomial name
- Dicranella varia (Hedw.) Schimp.

= Dicranella varia =

Species of moss

Dicranella varia is a species of moss belonging to the family Dicranaceae. It is native to Eurasia and South America.
