= List of plants known as feather moss =

Feather moss, or Hypnales, is an order of leafy mosses.

Feather moss, feathermoss, or feather-moss may also refer to:

- Amblystegium confervoides, tiny feather-moss
- Amblystegium humile, constricted feather-moss
- Amblystegium radicale, swamp feather-moss
- Amblystegium serpens, creeping feather-moss
- Amblystegium varium, willow feather-moss
- Brachythecium albicans, whitish feather-moss
- Brachythecium appleyardiae, Appleyard's feather-moss
- Brachythecium erythrorrhizon, redfoot feather-moss
- Brachythecium glaciale, snow feather-moss
- Brachythecium glareosum, streaky feather-moss
- Brachythecium mildeanum, sand feather-moss
- Brachythecium plumosum, rusty feather-moss
- Brachythecium populeum, matted feather-moss
- Brachythecium reflexum, reflexed feather-moss
- Brachythecium rivulare, river feather-moss
- Brachythecium rutabulum, rough-stalked feather-moss
- Brachythecium salebrosum, smooth-stalk feather-moss
- Brachythecium starkei, Starke's feather-moss
- Brachythecium trachypodium, Lawers feather-moss
- Brachythecium velutinum, velvet feather-moss
- Campyliadelphus chrysophyllus, golden feather-moss
- Campyliadelphus elodes, fine-leaved marsh feather-moss
- Campylium protensum, dull starry feather-moss
- Campylium stellatum, yellow starry feather-moss
- Campylophyllum calcareum, chalk feather-moss
- Campylophyllum halleri, Haller's feather-moss
- Cirriphyllum cirrosum, tendril feather-moss
- Cirriphyllum crassinervium, beech feather-moss
- Cirriphyllum piliferum, hair-pointed feather-moss
- Conardia compacta, compact feather-moss
- Drepanocladus polygamus, fertile feather-moss
- Eurhynchium meridionale, Portland feather-moss
- Eurhynchium pulchellum, elegant feather-moss
- Eurhynchium striatulum, lesser striated feather-moss
- Eurhynchium striatum, common striated feather-moss
- Helodium blandowii, Blandow's feathermoss
- Herzogiella seligeri, Silesian feather-moss
- Herzogiella striatella, Muhlenbeck's feather-moss
- Homalia trichomanoides, blunt feather-moss
- Homalothecium lutescens, yellow feather-moss
- Homalothecium sericeum, silky wall feather-moss
- Homomallium incurvatum, incurved feather-moss
- Hygroamblystegium fluviatile, brook-side feather-moss
- Hygroamblystegium tenax, fountain feathermoss
- Homomallium incurvatum, incurved feathermoss
- Homalothecium sericeum, silky wall feathermoss
- Hylocomium splendens splendid feathermoss
- Kindbergia praelonga, common feathermoss
- Leptodictyum riparium, Kneiff's feathermoss
- Oxyrrhynchium hians, Swartz's feather-moss
- Oxyrrhynchium schleicheri, twist-tip feather-moss
- Oxyrrhynchium speciosum, showy feather-moss
- Platyhypnidium alopecuroides, Portuguese feathermoss
- Platyhypnidium riparioides, Long-beaked water feathermoss
- Pleurozium schreberi, red-stemmed feathermoss
- Pseudoscleropodium purum, neat feathermoss
- Ptilium crista-castrensis, ostrich-plume feathermoss
- Rhynchostegiella curviseta, curve-stalked feather-moss
- Rhynchostegiella litorea, scabrous feather-moss
- Rhynchostegiella pumila, dwarf feather-moss
- Rhynchostegiella tenella, tender feather-moss
- Rhynchostegiella teneriffae, Teesdale feather-moss
- Rhynchostegium confertum, clustered feather-moss
- Rhynchostegium megapolitanum, megapolitan feather-moss
- Rhynchostegium murale, wall feather-moss
- Rhynchostegium rotundifolium, round-leaved feather-moss
- Thamnobryum alopecurum, fox-tail feathermoss
- Thamnobryum angustifolium, Derbyshire feathermoss
- Thamnobryum cataractarum, Yorkshire feather-moss

== See also ==
- Moss (disambiguation)
