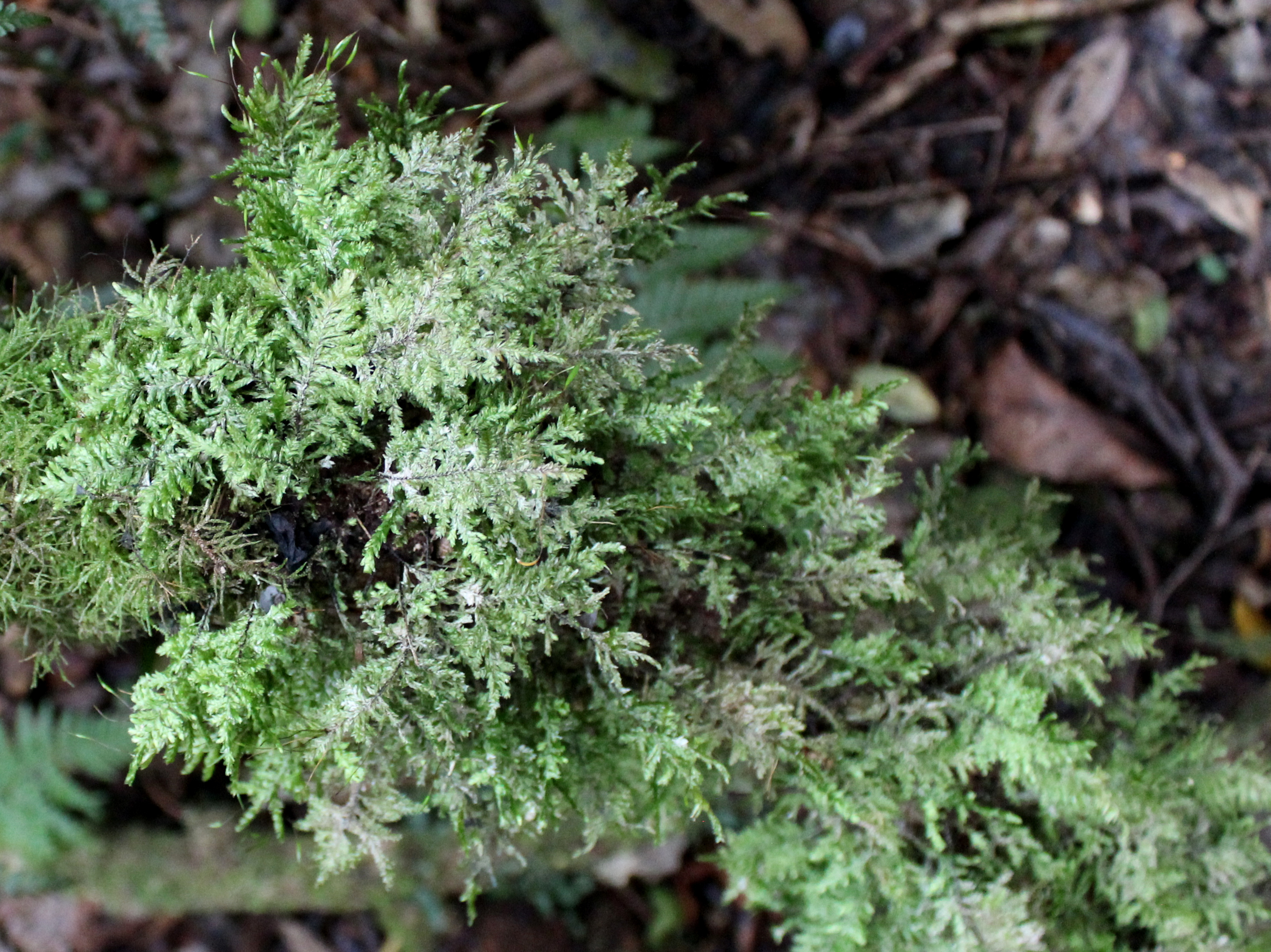
- moss at Werrikimbe National Park, Australia

Scientific classification
- Kingdom: Plantae
- Division: Bryophyta
- Class: Bryopsida
- Subclass: Bryidae
- Order: Hypnales
- Family: Brachytheciaceae
- Genus: Eurhynchium
- Species: E. praelongum

Binomial name
- Eurhynchium praelongum (Hedw.) Schimp.

Synonyms
- Bryhnia brittoniae (Grout) H. Rob.; Campylium serratum Cardot & H. Winter; Eurhynchium acutifolium Kindb.; Eurhynchium brittoniae Grout; Eurhynchium distans Bryhn; Eurhynchium praelongum var. praelongum; Eurhynchium stokesii (Turner) Schimp.; Eurhynchium stokesii var. teneriffae Renauld & Cardot; Hypnum claronii Lam. & DC.; Hypnum exasperatum Hampe; Hypnum stokesii Turner; Oxyrrhynchium biforme Broth.; Plagiothecium bifariellum Kindb.; Rigodium crassicostatum E.B. Bartram; Rigodium toxarioides Broth. & Paris

= Eurhynchium praelongum =

Species of moss

Eurhynchium praelongum is a species of moss with a widespread distribution. Found in Australia, New Zealand, North America, northern South America, Eurasia and North Africa.

In a 2003 study of the effect of the herbicide Asulam on moss growth, Eurhynchium praelongum was shown to have intermediate sensitivity to Asulam exposure.
