= Nils Conrad Kindberg =

Swedish bryologist

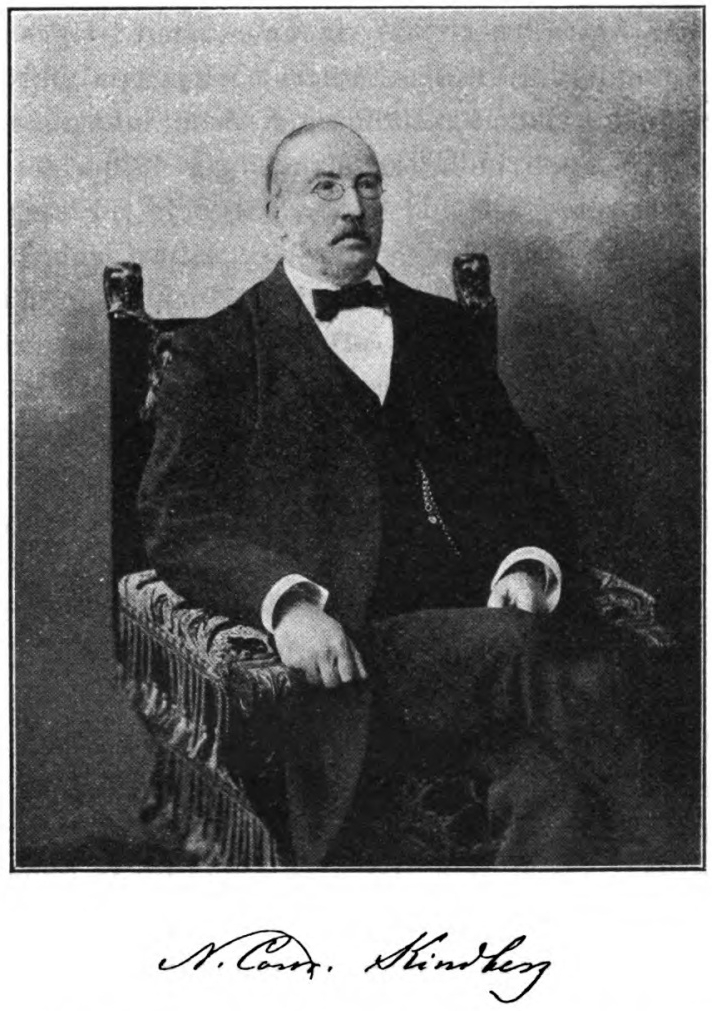
Nils Conrad Kindberg

Nils Conrad Kindberg (7 August 1832 in Karlstad – 23 August 1910 in Uppsala) was a Swedish bryologist.

From 1849 he studied at Uppsala University, earning his PhD in 1857. In 1859 he worked as a teacher in Vänersborg, then from 1860 to 1901 taught classes in natural sciences and mathematics in Linköping.

The moss genus Kindbergia (family Brachytheciaceae) is named in his honor.

== Selected works ==
- Monographia generis Lepigonorum (1863).
- Svensk flora. Beskrifning öfver Sveriges fanerogamer och ormbunkar (1877).
- "New Canadian mosses" (1889); with John Macoun.
- "Catalogue of Canadian plants. Part VI, musci"; with John Macoun (1892).
- "European and N. American Bryineæ (Mosses)"; 2 parts, published in English (1896).
- "Genera of European and Northamerican Bryineæ (Mosses) synoptically disposed" (1897).
- Laubmoose aus dem Umanakdistrikt (1897).
- Skandinavisk bladmossflora (1903).
- "New combinations and new taxa of mosses proposed by Nils Conrad Kindberg"; by William C. Steere and Howard A. Crum (1977).
