= Remyella =

Remyella may refer to:

- Remyella (beetle), a genus of beetles in the family Leiodidae
- Remyella (plant), a genus of mosses in the family Brachytheciaceae
