= Rhynchostegium serrulatum =

Scientific classification
- Kingdom: Plantae
- Division: Bryophyta
- Class: Bryopsida
- Subclass: Bryidae
- Order: Hypnales
- Family: Brachytheciaceae
- Genus: Rhynchostegium
- Species: R. serrulatum

Binomial name
- Rhynchostegium serrulatum (Hedw.) A.Jaeger

Synonyms
- Brachythecium serrulatum (Hedw.) H.Rob.; Eurhynchium serrulatum (Hedw.) Kindb.; Hypnum huitomalconum Müll.Hal.; Hypnum serrulatum Hedw.; Rhynchostegium blandum Hampe; Rhynchostegium blandum Hampe ex Besch.; Rhynchostegium callistomum Besch.; Rhynchostegium expallescens A.Jaeger; Rhynchostegium frondicola Müll.Hal.

Species of plant

Rhynchotegium serrulatum is a species of moss in the Brachytheciaceae family. It is mainly distributed throughout the Americas.

Rhynchotegium serrulatum is known to be able to use artificial light to grow in places which are otherwise devoid of natural light, such as Niagara Cave.
