= Nobregaea latinervis =

Conservation status
- Extinct (IUCN 3.1)

Scientific classification
- Kingdom: Plantae
- Division: Bryophyta
- Class: Bryopsida
- Subclass: Bryidae
- Order: Hypnales
- Family: Brachytheciaceae
- Genus: Nobregaea
- Species: †N. latinervis

Binomial name
- †Nobregaea latinervis Hedenäs

Species of moss

Nobregaea latinervis is a species of moss belonging to the family Brachytheciaceae. The species was endemic to northeastern Madeira but it has not been seen since 1946, and was declared extinct in 2019. Its discovery was first published in 1992. N. latinervis was often found in forest habitats.
