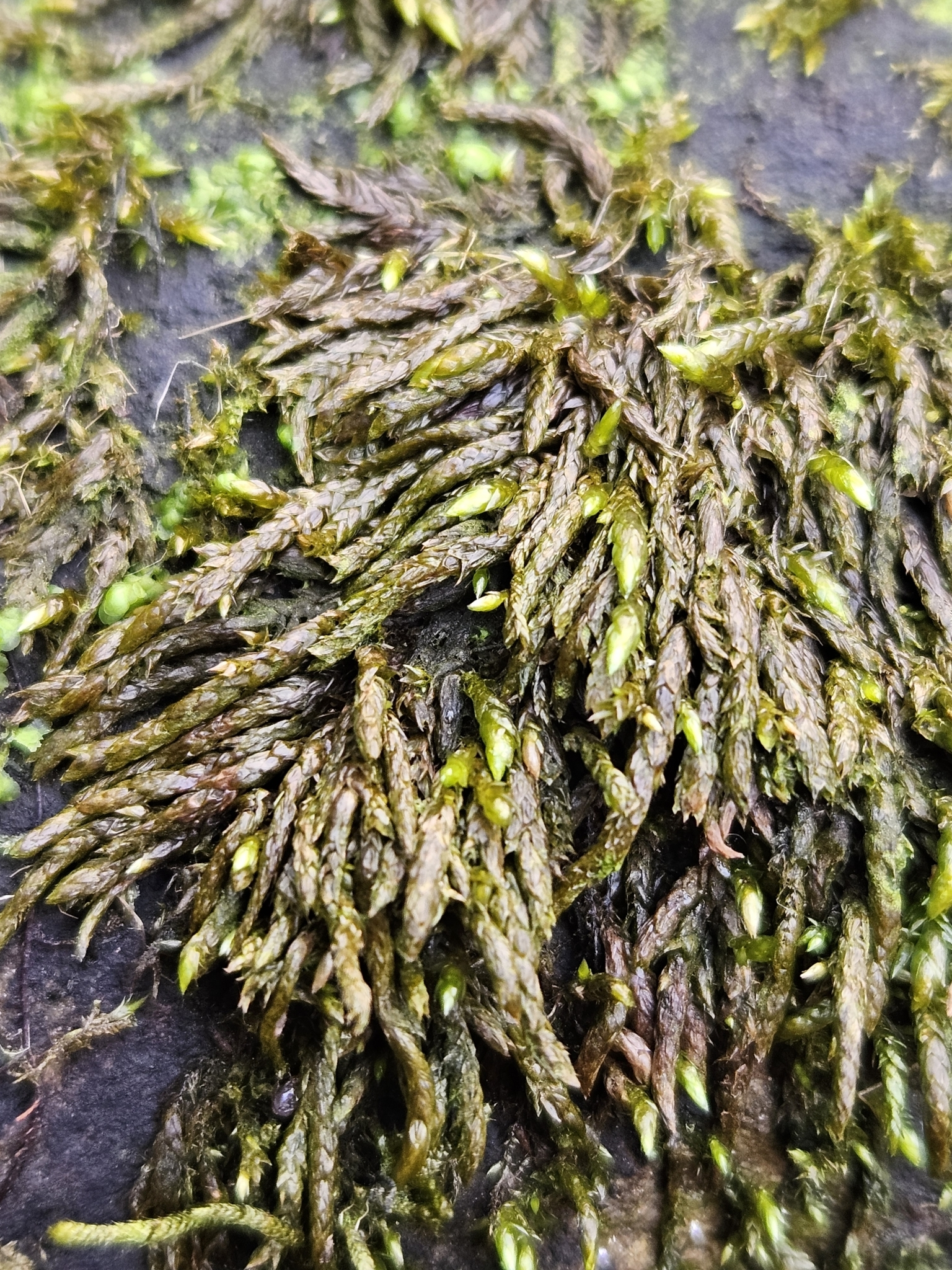

Conservation status
- Least Concern (IUCN 3.1)

Scientific classification
- Kingdom: Plantae
- Division: Bryophyta
- Class: Bryopsida
- Subclass: Bryidae
- Order: Hypnales
- Family: Brachytheciaceae
- Genus: Platyhypnidium
- Species: P. alopecuroides

Binomial name
- Platyhypnidium alopecuroides Koperski & Sauer, M.

Synonyms
- Rhynchostegium alopecuroides

= Platyhypnidium alopecuroides =

Species of moss

Platyhypnidium alopecuroides, or Portuguese feather-moss, is a species of moss from the family Brachytheciaceae, first described in 2000. It is an aquatic moss and is normally found growing in rocky streams.

== Description ==
Platyhypnidium alopecuroides is a green to brownish aquatic moss. The stems grow to approximately 10 cm in length and have few branches. The leaves are 2-3mm in length, concave and grow overlapping each other, giving it a cylindrical look.

== Habitat ==
It grows on rocks in fast flowing streams and can be found in both open and wooded areas.
