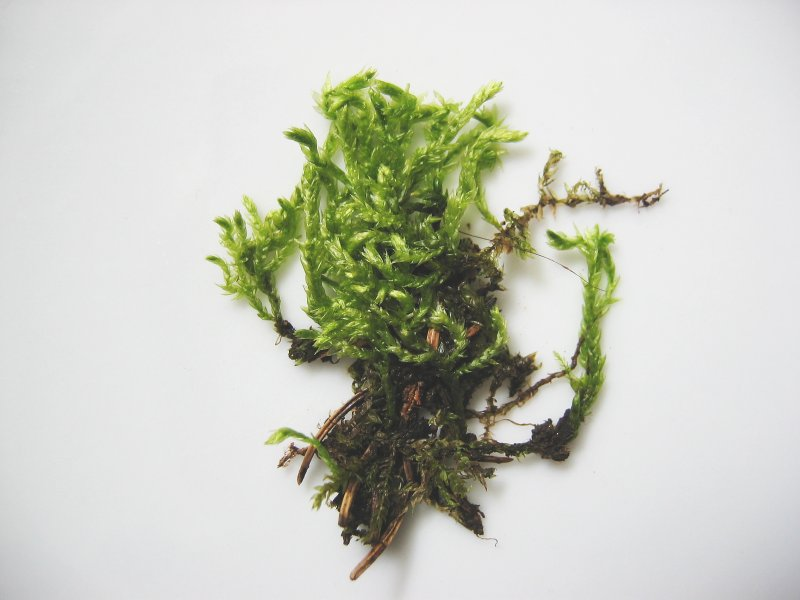
- Rhynchostegium murale

Scientific classification
- Kingdom: Plantae
- Division: Bryophyta
- Class: Bryopsida
- Subclass: Bryidae
- Order: Hypnales
- Family: Brachytheciaceae
- Genus: Rhynchostegium; Bruch & Schimp. 1852

= Rhynchostegium =

Genus of mosses

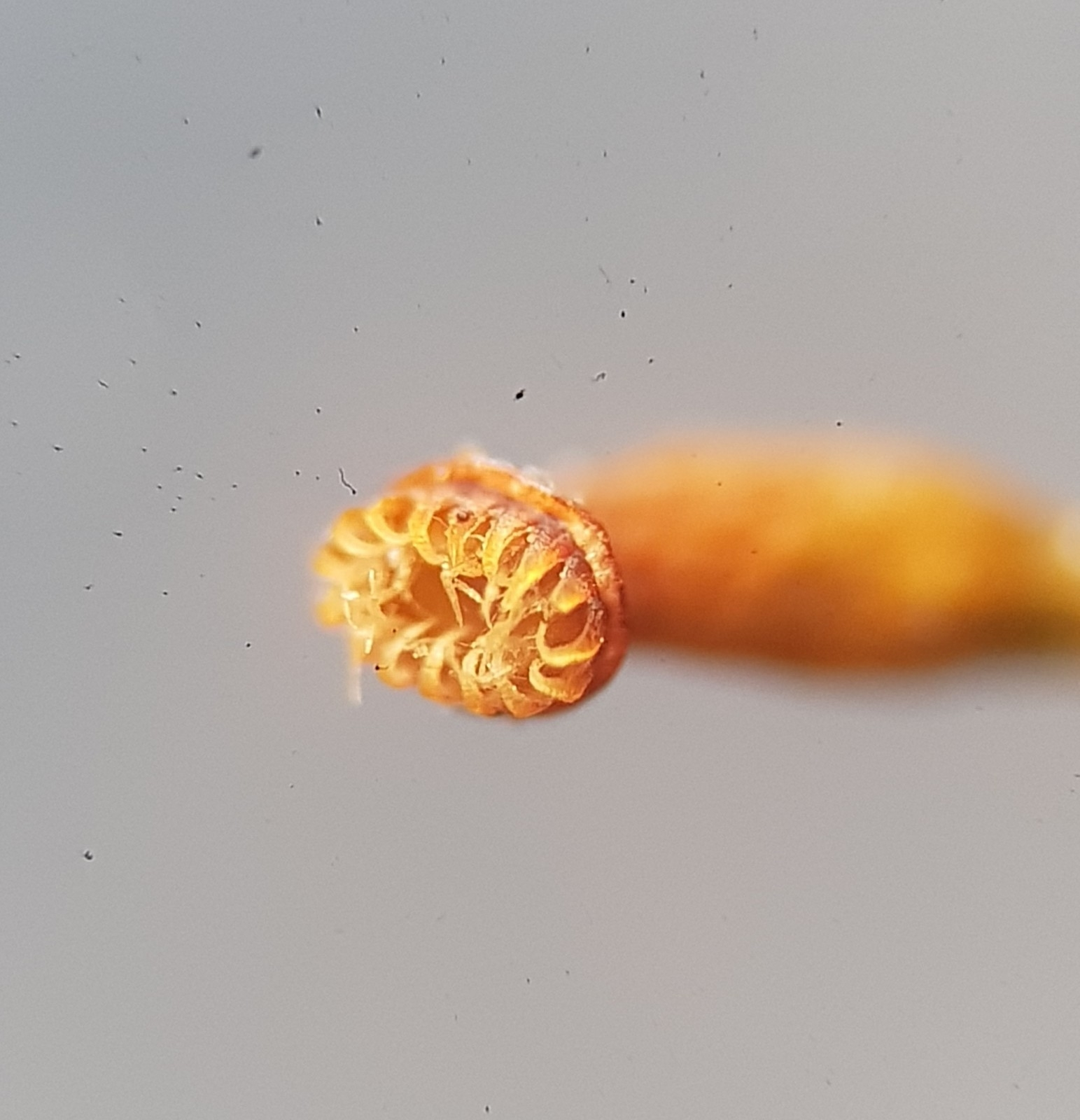
Rhynchostegium confertum peristome

Rhynchostegium is a genus of pleurocarpous mosses belonging to the family Brachytheciaceae. The genus has a cosmopolitan distribution across different climatological regions except the polar regions, mostly in tropic to north temperate regions. The genus contains both aquatic and terrestrial species. The genus was named for their rostrate opercula. The type species of this genus is Rhynchostegium confertum (Dicks.) Schimp.

== Etymology ==
The genus name comes from the Greek rhyncho- (beaked) and stegos (a lid), which refers to the rostrate operculum of the sporophyte.

== History ==
The genus was first described by Bruch and Wilhelm Philippe Schimper in 1852.

== Habitats ==
Terrestrial species of Rhynchostegium live in moist to wet or shaded habitats, on rock, soil, tree base, tree stem, and logs.

Aquatic species live by or in running water, including streams, springs, rivers, beds of waterfalls, and seepy cliffs.

== Morphology ==
=== Gametophyte ===
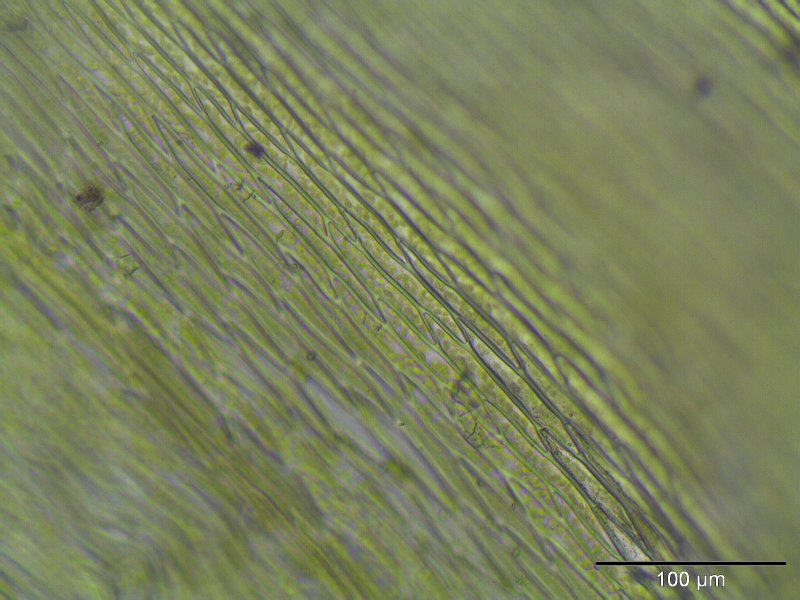
Lamina of Rhynchostegium murale.

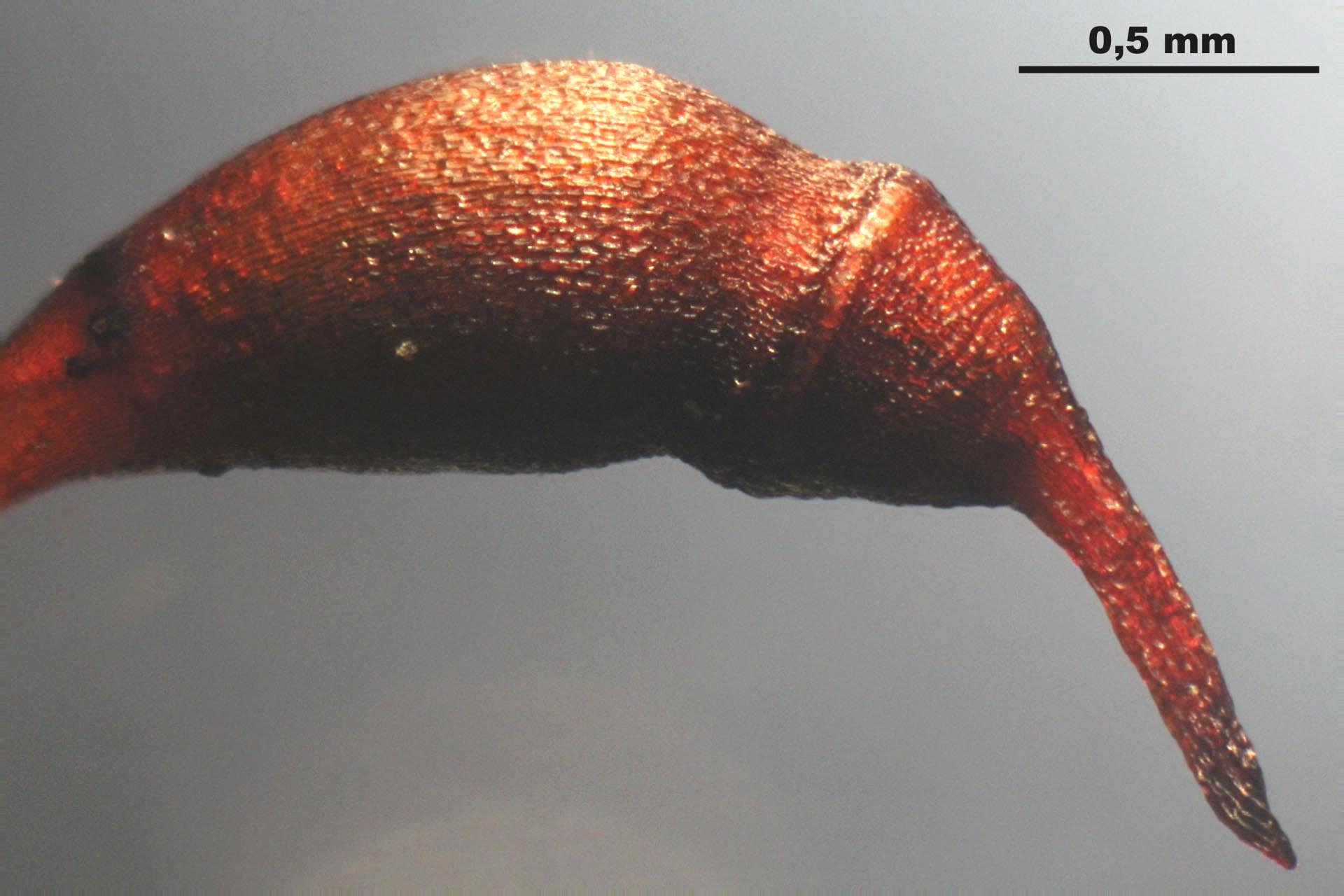
A Close view of Rhynchostegium murale sporangium. Rostrate operculum can be seen.

Rhynchostegium are small to large mosses that form either loose tuft or extensive mats on the substrate, with irregular or regular branching. The younger plants are generally deep green or light green; aging plants could become whitish, brownish, or paler green. Stems are creeping and lack hyaloderm, with acute to acuminate pseudoparaphyllia. Stem leaves are erectopatent or erect. Branch leaves are similar in morphology to stem leaves but smaller and sometimes narrower. Leaves are commonly straightly to homomallously arranged; subimbricate, subcomplanate, or complanate arrangement are sometimes seen, especially in branch leaves. Leaf base, decurrent or not, varies from ovate to ovate-cordate, occasionally lanceolate, and the narrowing from gradual to abrupt, towards a short- or long-acuminate apex, where sometimes a differentiated long acumen or apiculus is present. The leaves have a single costa that generally smoothly ends 35-75% up the leaf, and more often in branch leaves in an abaxial spine. Leaf surfaces vary from flat to slightly concave and not to strongly longitudinally plicate, with little to some pores and linear laminal cells. Leaf margins are serrate to serrulate. Axillary hairs constitute of 3-7 cells, with 1-3 upper cells. Alar cells are slightly enlarged, and either undifferentiated or quadrate to elongate-rectangular.

=== Sporophyte ===
Rhynchostegium are autoicous. Covered by a naked calyptra is a rostrate to long-rostrate operculum attached to a red-brown to brown, oblong-cylindric, weakly curved capsule, which is inclined or horizontal to a red-brown, smooth seta that has abruptly contracted perichaetial leaves at the base, with acumen straight to reflexed. An annulus separates the operculum. The peristome is xerochastic and perfect, which the red to orange-red exostomes have reduced trabeculae and cross-striolae at the base of the teeth; in rare cases the exostomes are narrow and yellow. The broadly or narrowly perforated endostomes and developed to vestigial cilia are supported by a low or high basal membrane. Spore diameters range between 9-16 μm.

== Biochemistry ==
=== Allelopathy ===
Allelopathy has been studied on Rhynchostegium pallidifolium, which usually form pure colonies in their natural habitat. Methanol extract of R.pallidifolium represses the seedling of cress, alfalfa, lettuce, ryegrass, timothy, and Digitaria sanguinalis in a concentration-dependent manner. A combination of ESI-MS and ^{1}H NMR analyses identified the inhibitory chemical as 3-hydroxy-β-ionone. Further study showed a minimal 3-hydroxy-β-ionone concentration of 1 μM for the inhibition of cress hypocotyl growth, and 3 μM for cress root growth, while the endogenous concentration. The presence of 3-hydroxy-β-ionone in their natural substrate and the growing medium suggested secretion to the environment, which may imply an important role of 3-hydroxy-β-ionone in competition with other plants and the forming of pure colonies.

=== Antibacterial ===
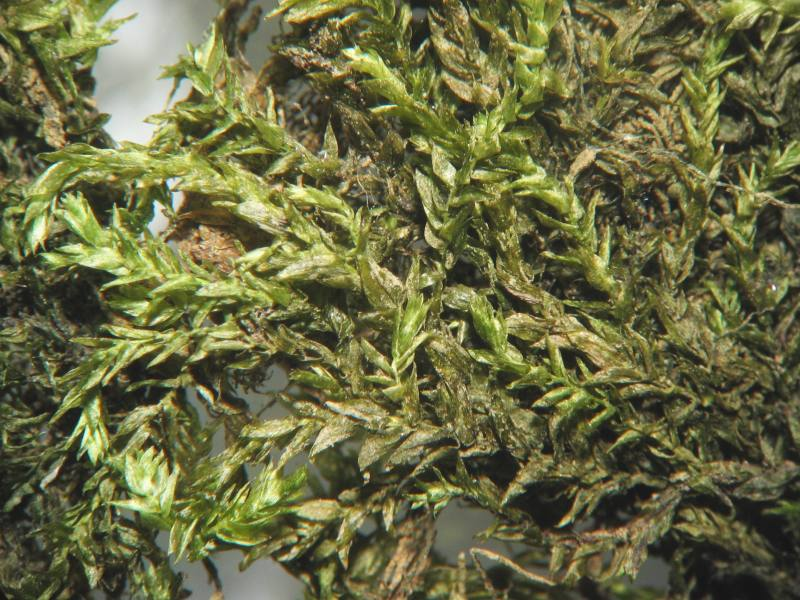
Rhynchostegium riparioides

Acetone extract of Rhynchostegium riparioides showed antibiotic activity on some Gram-negative bacteria, including Escherichia coli, Proteus mirabilis, Entero-bacter cloacae and Pseudomonas aeruginosa.

Ethanolic extract of Rhynchostegium vagans showed similar effect on some Gram-negative bacteria and fungi, with performance superior to chloramphenicol and fluconazole.

== Applications ==
=== Freshwater monitoring ===
Rhynchostegium riparioides is used in monitoring of heavy metals concentration in freshwater in multiple regions around the world, such as copper, zinc. R. riparioides as a neutrophilous species has been used in monitoring water acidification.

== List of species ==
The World Flora Online lists 221 species of Rhynchostegium.

- Rhynchostegium acanthophyllum (Mont.) A. Jaeger
- Rhynchostegium acicula (Broth.) Broth.
- Rhynchostegium acutifolium (Hook. f. & Wilson) A. Jaeger
- Rhynchostegium alboviridum R.S. Williams
- Rhynchostegium algirianum (Brid. ex P. Beauv.) Lindb.
- Rhynchostegium alopecuroides (Brid.) A.J.E. Sm.
- Rhynchostegium altisetum Müll. Hal.
- Rhynchostegium ambiguum (Schwägr.) W.R. Buck
- Rhynchostegium anceps (Bosch & Sande Lac.) A. Jaeger
- Rhynchostegium aneuron Kindb.
- Rhynchostegium angustifolium Renauld & Cardot
- Rhynchostegium apophysatum (Hornsch.) A. Jaeger
- Rhynchostegium aquaticum A. Jaeger
- Rhynchostegium arcticum (I. Hagen) Ignatov & Huttunen
- Rhynchostegium asperisetum (Müll. Hal.) A. Jaeger
- Rhynchostegium assumptionis Besch.
- Rhynchostegium bello-intricatum (Broth.) Paris
- Rhynchostegium bequaertii Thér. & Naveau
- Rhynchostegium berteroanum (Mont.) A. Jaeger
- Rhynchostegium beskeanum (Müll. Hal.) A. Jaeger
- Rhynchostegium bifariellum (Kindb.) Kindb.
- Rhynchostegium brachypterum (Hornsch.) A. Jaeger
- Rhynchostegium brachypyxis Renauld & Cardot
- Rhynchostegium brachythecioides Dixon & P. de la Varde
- Rhynchostegium brandegei (Austin) Renauld & Cardot
- Rhynchostegium brevicuspis Müll. Hal.
- Rhynchostegium brevinerve Huttunen & Ignatov
- Rhynchostegium brevirete Broth.
- Rhynchostegium buluense (Broth.) Paris
- Rhynchostegium cacticola (Müll. Hal.) Paris
- Rhynchostegium calderi Vohra
- Rhynchostegium caloosiense (Austin) Renauld & Cardot
- Rhynchostegium campylocarpum (Müll. Hal.) De Not.
- Rhynchostegium campylocladulum Müll. Hal.
- Rhynchostegium cataractarum Thér. & P. de la Varde
- Rhynchostegium celebicum (Sande Lac.) A. Jaeger
- Rhynchostegium chrysophylloides A. Jaeger
- Rhynchostegium circinatum (Brid.) De Not.
- Rhynchostegium cirrosum (Schwägr.) De Not.
- Rhynchostegium collatum (Hook. & Wilson) Broth. & Watts
- Rhynchostegium comorae (Müll. Hal.) A. Jaeger
- Rhynchostegium complanum (Mitt.) A. Jaeger
- Rhynchostegium compridense (Müll. Hal. ex Broth.) Paris
- Rhynchostegium conchophyllum (Taylor) A. Jaeger
- Rhynchostegium confertum (Dicks.) Schimp.
- Rhynchostegium confusum Cezón, J. Muñoz, Hedenäs & Huttunen
- Rhynchostegium congruens (Hampe) Mitt.
- Rhynchostegium conostomus (Mont.) Huttunen & Ignatov
- Rhynchostegium contortulum Tixier
- Rhynchostegium contractum Cardot
- Rhynchostegium crassinervium (Taylor) De Not.
- Rhynchostegium cylindritheca Dixon
- Rhynchostegium dasyphyllum Müll. Hal.
- Rhynchostegium delicatulum James
- Rhynchostegium demissum (Wilson) Schimp.
- Rhynchostegium dentiferum (Hampe) A. Jaeger
- Rhynchostegium deplanatum (Bruch & Schimp. ex Sull.) Kindb.
- Rhynchostegium depressum (Brid.) Schimp.
- Rhynchostegium distans Besch.
- Rhynchostegium distratum (Hampe) A. Jaeger
- Rhynchostegium drepanocladioides (Müll. Hal.) Kindb.
- Rhynchostegium duthiei Müll. Hal. ex Dixon
- Rhynchostegium elusum (Mitt.) A. Jaeger
- Rhynchostegium erythropodium (Hampe) Mitt.
- Rhynchostegium esquirolii Cardot & Thér.
- Rhynchostegium exiguum (Blandow) Brockm.
- Rhynchostegium exilissimum (Sull.) A. Jaeger
- Rhynchostegium fabroniadelphus (Müll. Hal.) A. Jaeger
- Rhynchostegium fauriei Cardot
- Rhynchostegium finitimum (Hampe) Ångström
- Rhynchostegium fissidens (Müll. Hal.) Kindb.
- Rhynchostegium fissidentellum Besch.
- Rhynchostegium fragilicuspis Dixon
- Rhynchostegium fuegianum (Cardot) Huttunen & Ignatov
- Rhynchostegium funckii (Schimp.) De Not.
- Rhynchostegium gaudichaudii (Mont.) A. Jaeger
- Rhynchostegium georgianum Dixon & Grout
- Rhynchostegium glaucovirescens (Müll. Hal.) Kindb.
- Rhynchostegium globipyxis (Müll. Hal.) Kindb.
- Rhynchostegium gracilipes Thér.
- Rhynchostegium graminicolor (Brid.) A.L. Andrews
- Rhynchostegium herbaceum (Mitt.) A. Jaeger
- Rhynchostegium hians (Hedw.) Delogne
- Rhynchostegium homaliocaulon (Müll. Hal.) Kindb.
- Rhynchostegium hookeri A. Jaeger
- Rhynchostegium hopfferi (Welw. & Duby) A. Gepp
- Rhynchostegium horridum Broth.
- Rhynchostegium huitomalconum (Müll. Hal.) Besch.
- Rhynchostegium humillimum (Mitt.) A. Jaeger
- Rhynchostegium hunanense Ignatov & Huttunen
- Rhynchostegium huttonii (Hampe ex Beckett) Paris
- Rhynchostegium illecebrum (Schimp.) Delogne
- Rhynchostegium inaequale Dixon
- Rhynchostegium inclinatum (Mitt.) A. Jaeger
- Rhynchostegium inerme (Mitt.) A. Jaeger
- Rhynchostegium irriguum Dixon
- Rhynchostegium isopterygioides Cardot
- Rhynchostegium jamesii Sull.
- Rhynchostegium javanicum (Bél.) Besch.
- Rhynchostegium jovet-astiae Bizot
- Rhynchostegium laevisetum (Geh.) Mitt.
- Rhynchostegium lamasicum (Spruce ex Mitt.) Besch.
- Rhynchostegium laxatum (Mitt.) Paris
- Rhynchostegium laxirete Broth.
- Rhynchostegium leptoblastum (Müll. Hal.) Kindb.
- Rhynchostegium leptomerocarpum (Müll. Hal.) Besch.
- Rhynchostegium leptopteridium Müll. Hal.
- Rhynchostegium leucodictyon Müll. Hal.
- Rhynchostegium lindmanii (Broth.) Paris
- Rhynchostegium lusitanicum (Kindb.) Broth.
- Rhynchostegium luteonitens (Welw. & Duby) A. Jaeger
- Rhynchostegium mac-owanianum Paris
- Rhynchostegium malmei (Broth.) Paris
- Rhynchostegium megapolitanum (Blandow ex F. Weber & D. Mohr) Schimp.
- Rhynchostegium membranaceum (Müll. Hal.) Broth.
- Rhynchostegium menadense (Sande Lac.) A. Jaeger
- Rhynchostegium meridionale (Schimp.) De Not.
- Rhynchostegium micans (Sw.) Austin
- Rhynchostegium microthamnioides Müll. Hal.
- Rhynchostegium minutum Müll. Hal.
- Rhynchostegium muelleri A. Jaeger
- Rhynchostegium murale (Hedw.) Schimp.
- Rhynchostegium muriculatum (Hook. f. & Wilson) Reichardt
- Rhynchostegium mutatum (Ochyra & Vanderp.) Huttunen & Ignatov
- Rhynchostegium myosuroides (Brid.) De Not.
- Rhynchostegium nanopennatum (Broth.) Kindb.
- Rhynchostegium nanothecium Müll. Hal. ex Dixon
- Rhynchostegium nervosum (Kiaer ex Renauld) Broth. ex Cardot
- Rhynchostegium nigrescens Besch.
- Rhynchostegium oblongifolium Broth. & Watts
- Rhynchostegium obtusatum Broth.
- Rhynchostegium obtusifolium (Mitt.) A. Jaeger
- Rhynchostegium occultum Larraín, Huttunen, Ignatova & Ignatov
- Rhynchostegium omocrates W.R. Buck
- Rhynchostegium ovalfolium S. Okamura
- Rhynchostegium oxyodon (Welw. & Duby) A. Gepp
- Rhynchostegium pallidifolium (Mitt.) A. Jaeger
- Rhynchostegium pallidius (Hampe) A. Jaeger
- Rhynchostegium pampae (Müll. Hal.) Kindb.
- Rhynchostegium parvulum Broth.
- Rhynchostegium patulifolium Cardot & Thér.
- Rhynchostegium patulum A. Jaeger
- Rhynchostegium pectinatum (Mitt.) Paris
- Rhynchostegium pellucidum Dixon
- Rhynchostegium pendulum (Brid.) A. Jaeger
- Rhynchostegium peruviense (R.S. Williams) Ochyra
- Rhynchostegium pervilleanum (Schimp.) A. Jaeger
- Rhynchostegium philippinense (Duby) A. Jaeger
- Rhynchostegium piliferum (Hedw.) De Not.
- Rhynchostegium pinnicaule (Müll. Hal.) Kindb.
- Rhynchostegium plagiotheciella Müll. Hal.
- Rhynchostegium planifolium Müll. Hal.
- Rhynchostegium planiusculum (Mitt.) A. Jaeger
- Rhynchostegium praecox (Hedw.) De Not.
- Rhynchostegium praelongum (Hedw.) De Not.
- Rhynchostegium pringlei Cardot
- Rhynchostegium pseudoconfertum (Müll. Hal.) A. Jaeger
- Rhynchostegium pseudodistans Cardot
- Rhynchostegium pseudomurale (Hampe) A. Jaeger
- Rhynchostegium pseudoserrulatum (Kindb.) Kindb.
- Rhynchostegium psilopodium Ignatov & Huttunen
- Rhynchostegium pulchellum (Hedw.) H. Rob.
- Rhynchostegium pumilum (Wilson) De Not.
- Rhynchostegium raphidorrhynchum (Müll. Hal.) A. Jaeger
- Rhynchostegium recurvans (Michx.) Besch.
- Rhynchostegium revelstokense (Kindb.) Kindb.
- Rhynchostegium riparioides (Hedw.) Cardot
- Rhynchostegium rivale (Hampe) A. Jaeger
- Rhynchostegium robustum W.R. Buck
- Rhynchostegium rotundifolium (Scop. ex Brid.) Schimp.
- Rhynchostegium royae (Austin) Renauld & Cardot
- Rhynchostegium ruvenzorense (Broth.) Paris
- Rhynchostegium santaiense (Broth. & Paris) Broth.
- Rhynchostegium sarcoblastum Broth. & Paris
- Rhynchostegium savatieri Paris
- Rhynchostegium scariosum (Taylor) A. Jaeger
- Rhynchostegium selaginellifolium Müll. Hal.
- Rhynchostegium sellowii (Hornsch.) A. Jaeger
- Rhynchostegium semiscabrum (E.B. Bartram) H. Rob.
- Rhynchostegium semitortulum Kindb.
- Rhynchostegium semitortum A. Jaeger
- Rhynchostegium senodictyon (Müll. Hal.) A. Jaeger
- Rhynchostegium serpenticaule (Müll. Hal.) Broth.
- Rhynchostegium serrulatum (Hedw.) A. Jaeger
- Rhynchostegium shawii Hutsemekers & Vanderp.
- Rhynchostegium sinense (Broth. & Paris) Broth.
- Rhynchostegium sparsirameum (Geh. & Hampe) Paris
- Rhynchostegium stokesii (Turner) De Not.
- Rhynchostegium stramineoides (Sauerb.) Wijk & Margad.
- Rhynchostegium striatum (Schreb. ex Hedw.) De Not.
- Rhynchostegium strigosum (Hoffm. ex F. Weber & D. Mohr) De Not.
- Rhynchostegium strongylense (Bott.) W.R. Buck & Privitera
- Rhynchostegium styriacum (Limpr.) Kindb.
- Rhynchostegium subacutifolium (Müll. Hal. ex Geh.) A. Jaeger
- Rhynchostegium subbrachypterum Broth. & Bryhn
- Rhynchostegium subclavatum (Hampe) A. Jaeger
- Rhynchostegium subconfertum (Müll. Hal.) A. Jaeger
- Rhynchostegium subenerve A. Jaeger
- Rhynchostegium submenadense Thér. & P. de la Varde
- Rhynchostegium subperspicuum (Müll. Hal.) Broth.
- Rhynchostegium subrectocarpum (Dixon) Vohra
- Rhynchostegium subrotundum (Hampe) A. Jaeger
- Rhynchostegium subrusciforme (Müll. Hal.) A. Jaeger
- Rhynchostegium subserrulatum (Müll. Hal.) A. Jaeger
- Rhynchostegium subspeciosum (Müll. Hal.) Müll. Hal.
- Rhynchostegium subtrachypterum Bryhn ex P. Syd.
- Rhynchostegium surrectum (Mitt.) A. Jaeger
- Rhynchostegium taphrophilum Müll. Hal.
- Rhynchostegium tenellum (Dicks.) Schimp.
- Rhynchostegium tenuifolium (Hedw.) Reichardt
- Rhynchostegium tenuivagum (Broth.) Paris
- Rhynchostegium tocaremae (Hampe) A. Jaeger
- Rhynchostegium trachynotum (Müll. Hal.) Kindb.
- Rhynchostegium trachypelma (Müll. Hal.) A. Jaeger
- Rhynchostegium trieblingii Müll. Hal.
- Rhynchostegium tubaronense Müll. Hal.
- Rhynchostegium ulicon (Taylor) A. Jaeger
- Rhynchostegium validum (Herzog) Ochyra
- Rhynchostegium vitianum E.B. Bartram & Dixon
- Rhynchostegium volkensii (Broth.) Paris
- Rhynchostegium vriesei (Dozy & Molk.) A. Jaeger
- Rhynchostegium zeyheri (Spreng. ex Müll. Hal.) A. Jaeger
