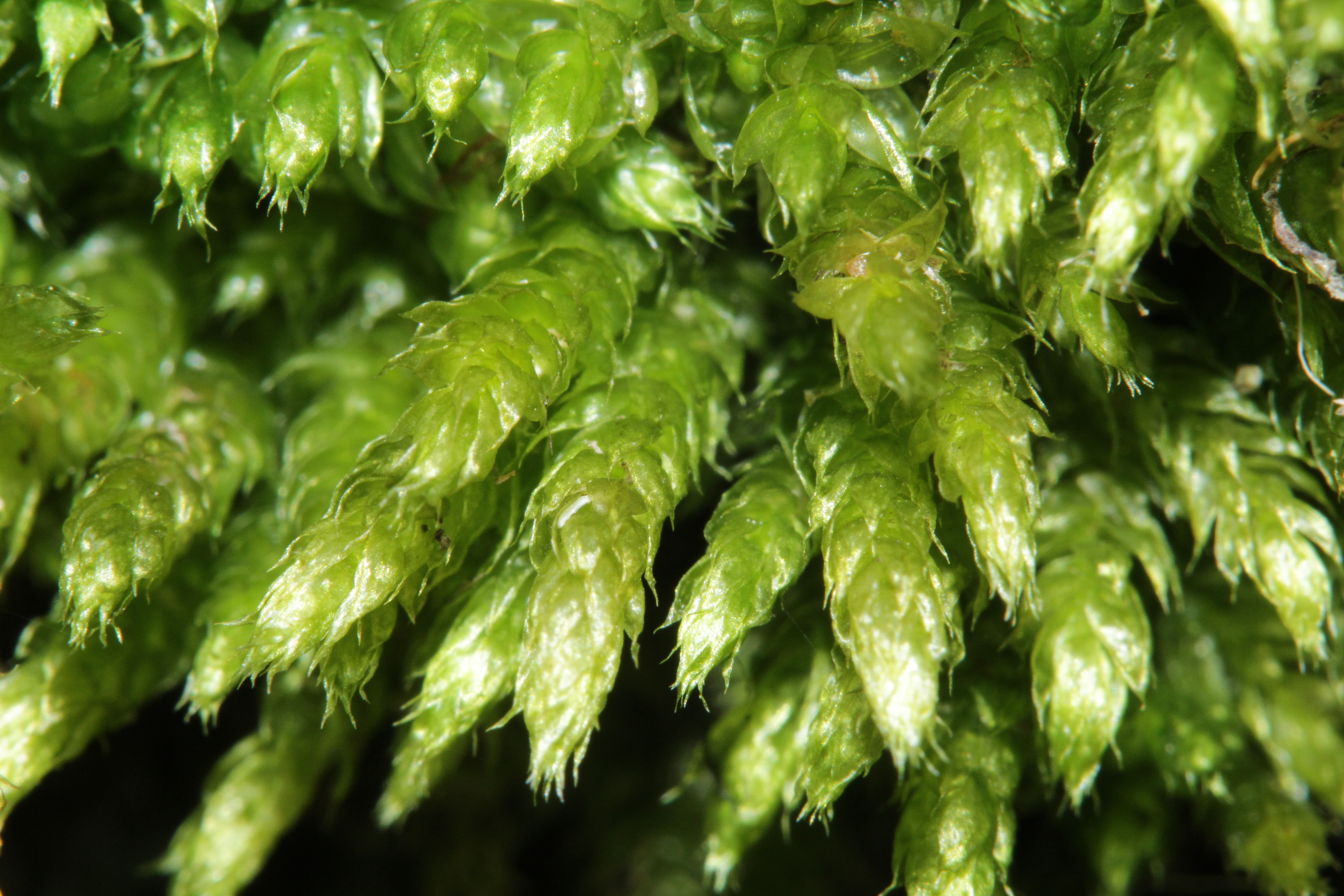
- Cirriphyllum crassinervium

Scientific classification
- Kingdom: Plantae
- Division: Bryophyta
- Class: Bryopsida
- Subclass: Bryidae
- Order: Hypnales
- Family: Brachytheciaceae
- Genus: Cirriphyllum; Grout

Synonyms
- Paramyurium (Limpr.) Warnst.

= Cirriphyllum =

Genus of mosses

Cirriphyllum is a genus of mosses belonging to the family Brachytheciaceae. The species of this genus are found in Eurasia and North America.

== Species ==
The following species are recognised in the genus Cirriphyllum:

- Cirriphyllum alare Dixon
- Cirriphyllum andinum Herzog
- Cirriphyllum brandegei Grout
- Cirriphyllum brunneoalare (Müll.Hal.) M.Fleisch.
- Cirriphyllum cameratum (Mitt.) Broth.
- Cirriphyllum cirrosum Grout
- Cirriphyllum crassinervium (Taylor) Loeske & M.Fleisch.
- Cirriphyllum meridense (Müll.Hal.) M.Fleisch.
- Cirriphyllum molliculum Broth.
- Cirriphyllum piliferum Grout
- Cirriphyllum pirottae Brotherus
- Cirriphyllum populeum
- Cirriphyllum romanum Brotherus
- Cirriphyllum subnerve Dixon
- Cirriphyllum tommasinii Grout
