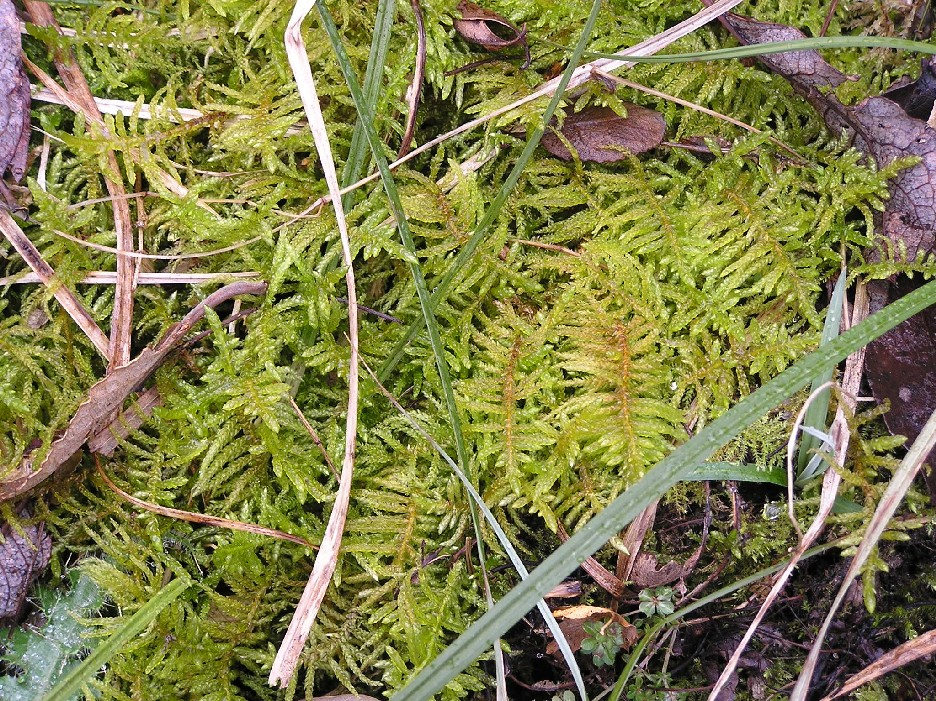
- Scleropodium purum

Scientific classification
- Kingdom: Plantae
- Division: Bryophyta
- Class: Bryopsida
- Subclass: Bryidae
- Order: Hypnales
- Family: Brachytheciaceae
- Genus: Scleropodium; Bruch & Schimp.

= Scleropodium =

Genus of mosses

Scleropodium is a genus of mosses belonging to the family Brachytheciaceae. The genus has an almost cosmopolitan distribution.

== Species ==
The following species are recognised in the genus Scleropodium:

- Scleropodium ambiguum (De Not.) A.Jaeger
- Scleropodium apiculigerum (Lindb. & Arnell) J.-P.Frahm
- Scleropodium aplocladum (Mitt.) Grout
- Scleropodium australe Hedenäs
- Scleropodium brachyphyllum Cardot
- Scleropodium californicum Kindberg
- Scleropodium cespitans L.F.Koch
- Scleropodium coreense Cardot
- Scleropodium giraldii Broth.
- Scleropodium julaceum E.Lawton
- Scleropodium krausei Macoun & Kindb.
- Scleropodium lentum (Mitt.) Grout
- Scleropodium levieri Broth.
- Scleropodium obtusifolium Kindberg
- Scleropodium occidentale B.E.Carter
- Scleropodium pseudopurum Broth.
- Scleropodium subcaespitosum Paris
- Scleropodium touretii L.F.Koch
