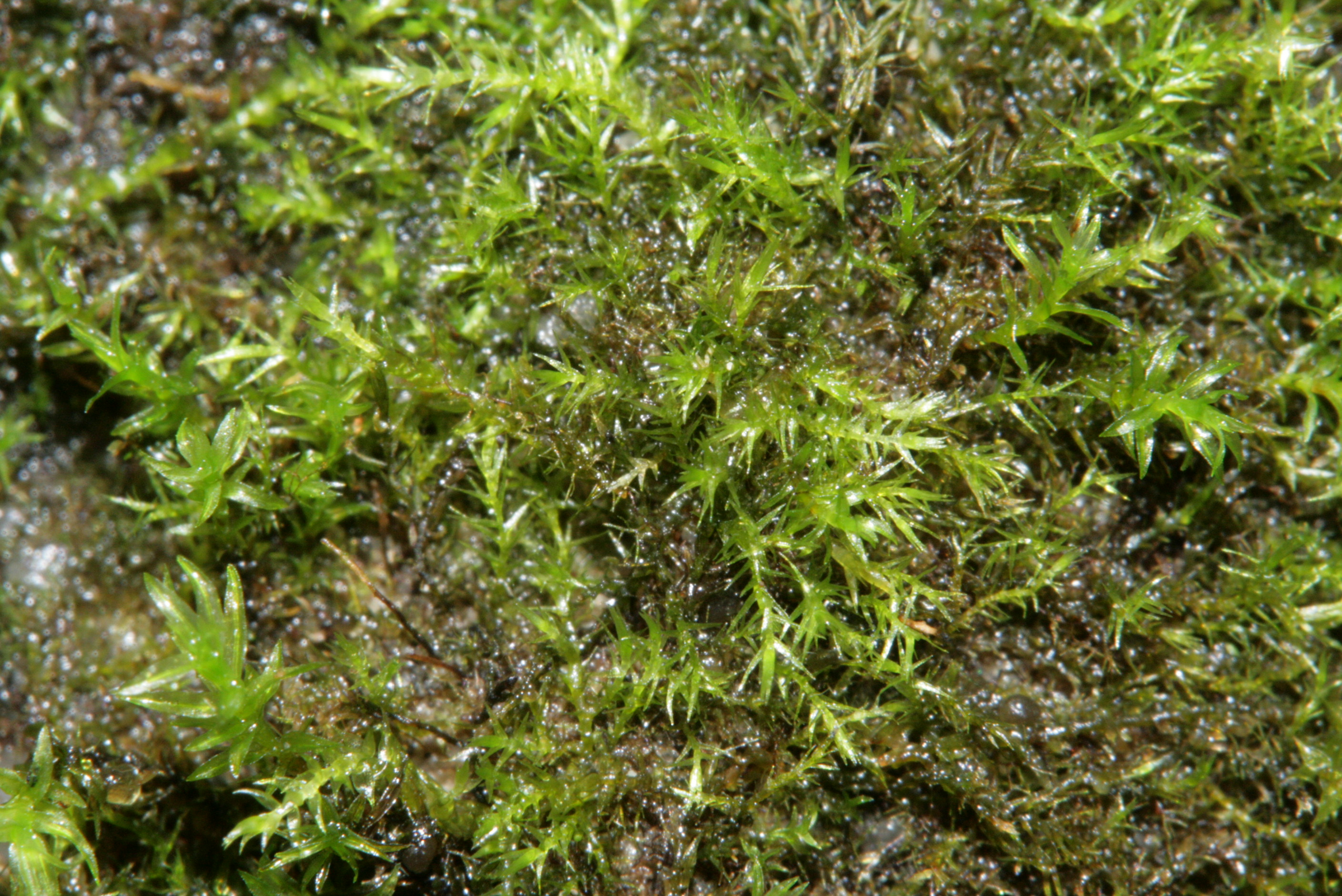
- Rhynchostegiella teneriffae

Scientific classification
- Kingdom: Plantae
- Division: Bryophyta
- Class: Bryopsida
- Subclass: Bryidae
- Order: Hypnales
- Family: Brachytheciaceae
- Genus: Rhynchostegiella (Schimp.) Limpr.

= Rhynchostegiella =

Genus of mosses

Rhynchostegiella is a genus of mosses belonging to the family Brachytheciaceae.

The genus has cosmopolitan distribution.

Species:

- Rhynchostegiella acicula Broth.
- Rhynchostegiella algiriana
