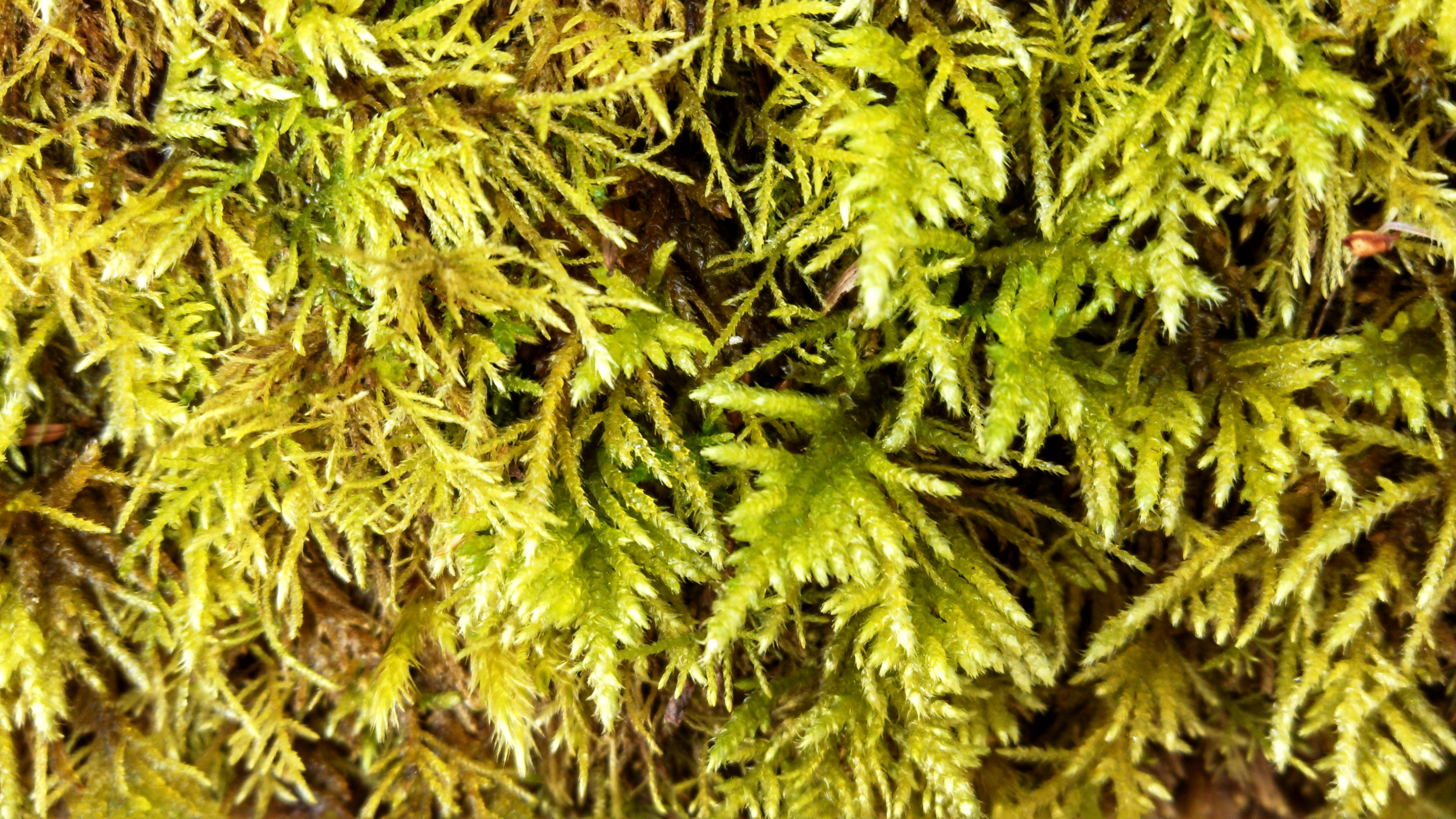
- Kindbergia oregana

Scientific classification
- Kingdom: Plantae
- Division: Bryophyta
- Class: Bryopsida
- Subclass: Bryidae
- Order: Hypnales
- Family: Brachytheciaceae
- Genus: Kindbergia; Ochyra

= Kindbergia =

Genus of mosses

Kindbergia is a genus of mosses belonging to the family Brachytheciaceae.

The genus was first described by Ryszard Ochyra in 1982.

The genus name of Kindbergia is in honour of Nils Conrad Kindberg (1832-1910), who was a Swedish bryologist.

== Description ==
Species in the genus are mat forming and grow to a medium to large size. Leaves are borne on creeping stems, and are regularly pinnate.

The genus has cosmopolitan distribution.

== Species ==
Species adapted from The Plant List;

- Kindbergia africana (Herzog) Ochyra
- Kindbergia altaica (Ignatov) Ignatov & Huttunen
- Kindbergia arbuscula (Broth.) Ochyra
- Kindbergia brittoniae (Grout) Ochyra
- Kindbergia dumosa (Mitt.) Ignatov & Huttunen
- Kindbergia kenyae (Tosco & Piovano) O'Shea & Ochyra
- Kindbergia oedogonium (Müll. Hal.) Ochyra
- Kindbergia oregana (Sull.) Ochyra
- Kindbergia praelonga (Hedw.) Ochyra
- Kindbergia squarrifolia (Broth. ex Iisiba) Ignatov & Huttunen
