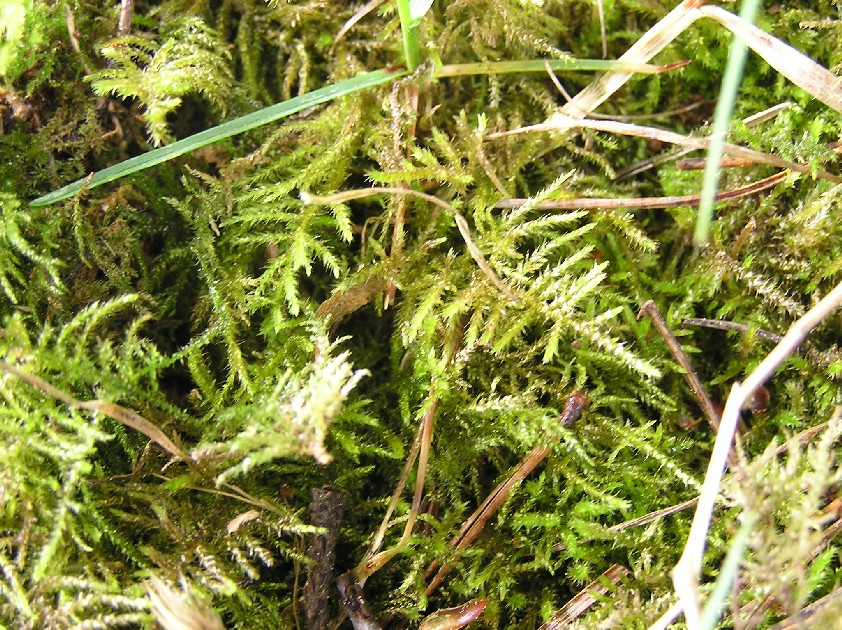

Scientific classification
- Kingdom: Plantae
- Division: Bryophyta
- Class: Bryopsida
- Subclass: Bryidae
- Order: Hypnales
- Family: Brachytheciaceae
- Genus: Kindbergia
- Species: K. praelonga

Binomial name
- Kindbergia praelonga (Hedw.) Ochyra

Synonyms
- Eurhynchium serricuspis Müll.Hal.; Kindbergia praelonga var. praelonga; Pancovia praelonga (Hedw.) J.Kickx f.; Stokesiella praelonga (Hedw.) H.Rob.

= Kindbergia praelonga =

Species of moss

Kindbergia praelonga, known as common feather-moss, is a species of moss belonging to the family Brachytheciaceae. It is a medium to large size moss with pinnate branches. The species is of interest for having properties that may be beneficial for human health.

The species is found worldwide in moist to wet habitats. It is one of the most common mosses in lowland Great Britain.
