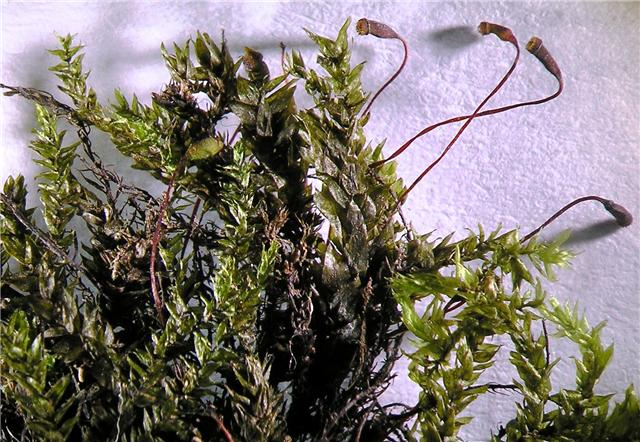
- Plants of Platyhypnidium riparioides

Conservation status
- Apparently Secure (NatureServe)

Scientific classification
- Kingdom: Plantae
- Division: Bryophyta
- Class: Bryopsida
- Subclass: Bryidae
- Order: Hypnales
- Family: Brachytheciaceae
- Genus: Platyhypnidium
- Species: P. riparioides

Binomial name
- Platyhypnidium riparioides (Hedw.) Dixon

Synonyms
- Rhynchostegium riparioides

= Platyhypnidium riparioides =

Species of moss

Platyhypnidium riparioides, the long-beaked water feathermoss, is a species of aquatic moss commonly found in many regions. This species is among the largest aquatic mosses growing up to 15 cm long. P. riparioides grows in a procumbent or pendulous fashion along rocks and tree roots and may form extensive lax mats of many intermingled plants. It is widely distributed South of the Arctic and can grow abundantly in suitable areas.

== Description ==
Platyhypnidium ripariodes is among the larger northern hemisphere mosses with leaves up to 8mm long and plants growing up to 15 cm long. In the UK, plants commonly produce calyptra with relatively long curving lids. The leaf tip is acute, leaf margins are plane, slightly denticulate towards tip, mid-leaf cells are large, costa or the central stork of the leaf extends nearly to leaf tip. The growth form is procumbent but small, young plants can attach themselves closely to rocks and appear flattened.

== Identification ==
Platyhypnidium ripariodes diagnostic features include its comparatively large size, up to 15 cm long, large leaf size up to 8 mm with elongated mid-leaf cells. Capsules are abundant and frequently produced and feature long curving lid. In the UK, mosses that grow in similar habitats and may be confused with P. ripariodes include the aquatic genus Brachythecium and Leptodictyum riparium. All these mosses are platycarpus, have a single nerve per leaf and overlap in size but can be separate by leaf shape, cell structure and growth form.

== Distribution ==
Wide global distribution found South of the Arctic polar region in flowing freshwater mainly in Northern Hemisphere. Found commonly in the British Isles.
