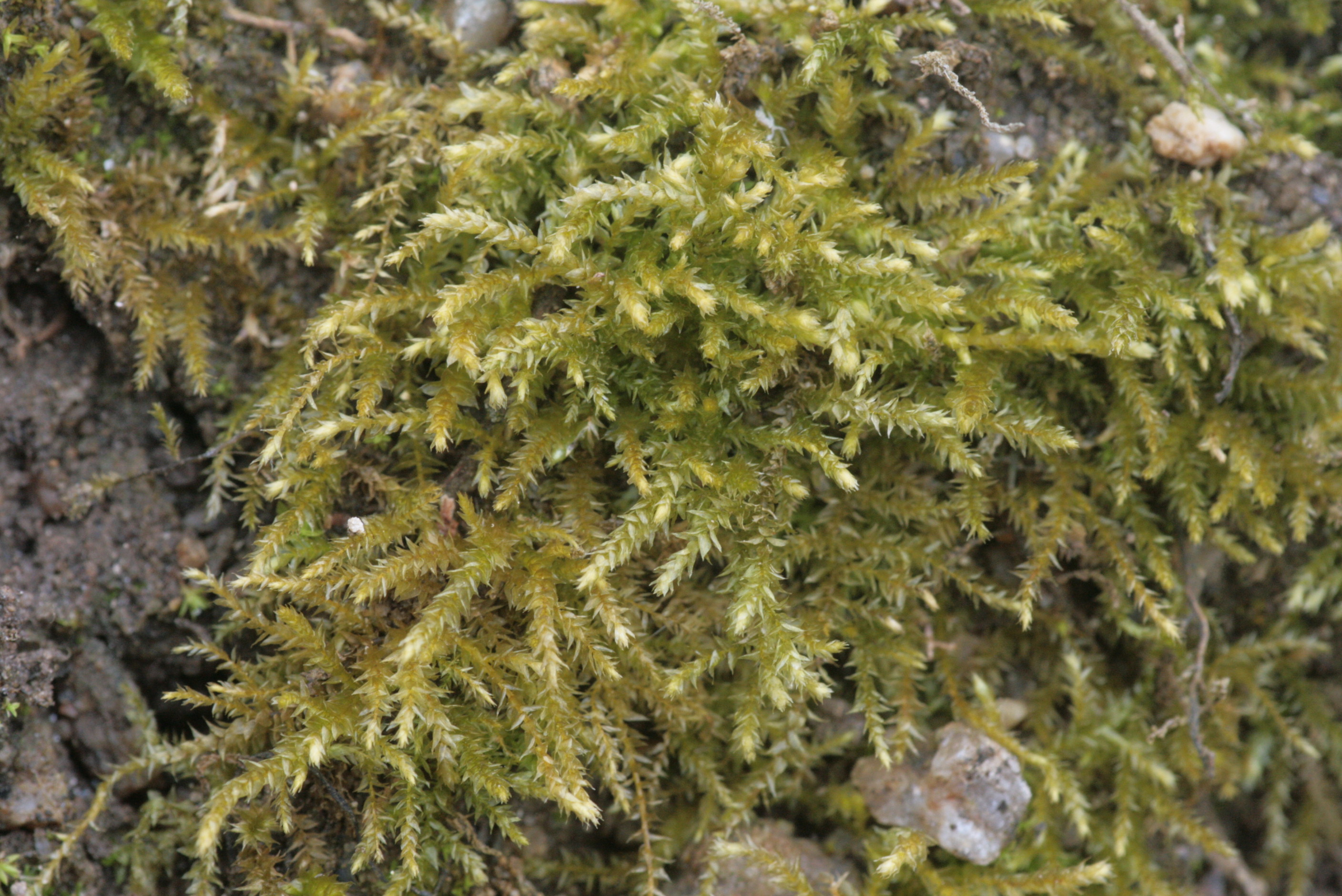
- Oxyrrhynchium hians

Scientific classification
- Kingdom: Plantae
- Division: Bryophyta
- Class: Bryopsida
- Subclass: Bryidae
- Order: Hypnales
- Family: Brachytheciaceae
- Genus: Oxyrrhynchium (Schimp.) Warnst.

= Oxyrrhynchium =

Genus of mosses

Oxyrrhynchium is a genus of mosses belonging to the family Brachytheciaceae. The genus has a cosmopolitan distribution.

== Species ==
The following species are recognised in the genus Oxyrrhynchium:

- Oxyrrhynchium altisetum Brotherus
- Oxyrrhynchium arachnoideum Sakurai
- Oxyrrhynchium bergmaniae (E.B.Bartram) Huttunen & Ignatov
- Oxyrrhynchium clinocarpum (Taylor) Broth.
- Oxyrrhynchium compressifolium (Paris) Broth.
- Oxyrrhynchium confervoideum Sim
- Oxyrrhynchium corralense (Lorentz) M.Fleisch. ex Reimers
- Oxyrrhynchium distantifolium R.S.Williams
- Oxyrrhynchium hians (Hedw.) Loeske
- Oxyrrhynchium kiusiuensis (Dixon & Thér.) Sakurai
- Oxyrrhynchium laosianum Dixon
- Oxyrrhynchium latifolium (Cardot) Podp.
- Oxyrrhynchium macroneuron (Grout) Wynns
- Oxyrrhynchium orotavense (Renauld & Cardot) Broth.
- Oxyrrhynchium ovatum Cardot & Potier de la Varde
- Oxyrrhynchium peyronelii Tosco & Piovano
- Oxyrrhynchium polystictum (Paris) Broth.
- Oxyrrhynchium porothamnioides Potier de la Varde & Levier
- Oxyrrhynchium pringlei (Cardot) Wynns
- Oxyrrhynchium protractum Brotherus
- Oxyrrhynchium pumilum (Wilson) Loeske
- Oxyrrhynchium remotifolium (Grev.) Broth.
- Oxyrrhynchium rigescens (Müll.Hal.) Broth. ex Paris
- Oxyrrhynchium rugisetum (Hampe) Herzog
- Oxyrrhynchium rugosipes (Besch.) Broth.
- Oxyrrhynchium scabripes (Müll.Hal.) Broth.
- Oxyrrhynchium schleicheri (R.Hedw.) Röll
- Oxyrrhynchium selaginellifolium (Müll.Hal.) Wynns
- Oxyrrhynchium speciosum (Brid.) Warnst.
- Oxyrrhynchium subasperum Sim
- Oxyrrhynchium tenuinerve (Cardot) Dixon
