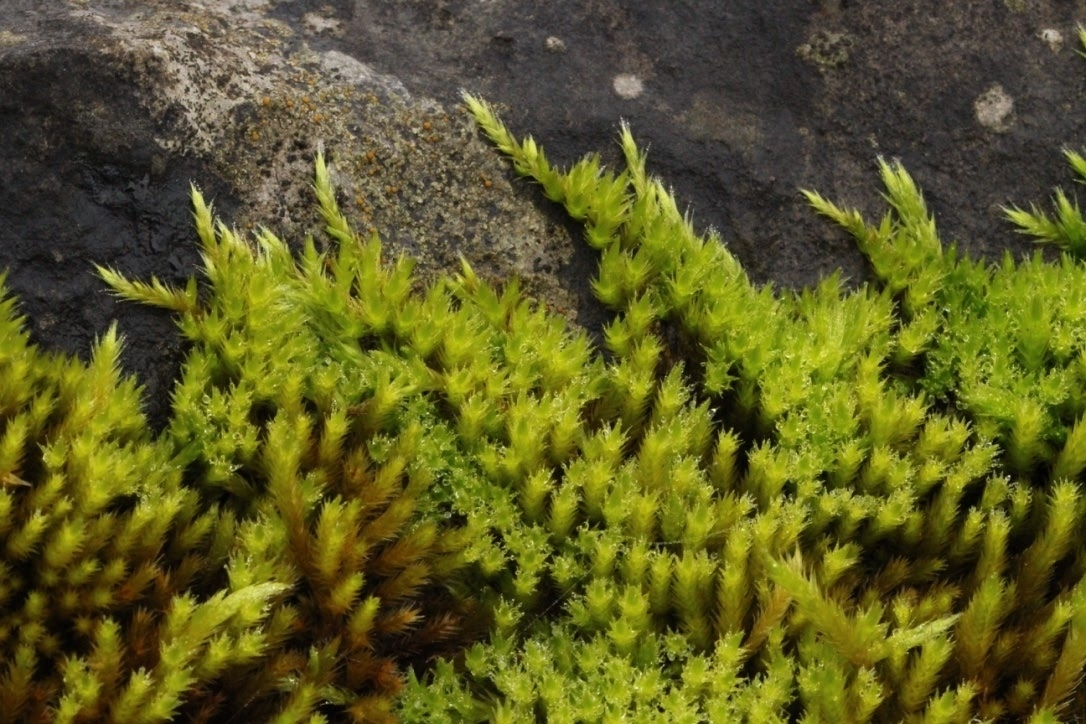
- Homalothecium lutescens

Scientific classification
- Kingdom: Plantae
- Division: Bryophyta
- Class: Bryopsida
- Subclass: Bryidae
- Order: Hypnales
- Family: Brachytheciaceae
- Genus: Homalothecium; Schimp.

= Homalothecium =

Genus of mosses

Homalothecium is a genus of mosses belonging to the family Brachytheciaceae.

== Species ==
The following species are recognised:

- Homalothecium aequatoriense Thériot, 1936
- Homalothecium afrostriatum (Müll.Hal.) Ochyra
- Homalothecium aplocladum (Mitt.) A.Jaeger
- Homalothecium appressifolium (R.S.Williams) Broth.
- Homalothecium arenarium E.Lawton, 1965
- Homalothecium aureum H.Robinson, 1962
- Homalothecium californicum Hedenäs, Huttunen, Shevock & D.H.Norris
- Homalothecium congestum (Sw. ex Hedw.) A.Jaeger
- Homalothecium decorum (Mitt.) A.Jaeger
- Homalothecium euchloron (Bruch ex Müll.Hal.) R.S.Chopra
- Homalothecium fulgescens (Mitt. ex Müll.Hal.) A.Jaeger
- Homalothecium gracillimum Dixon & Potier de la Varde, 1930
- Homalothecium incompletum Jaeger, 1880
- Homalothecium integerrimum Dixon, 1930
- Homalothecium laevisetum Sande Lacoste, 1866
- Homalothecium leucodonticaule (Müll.Hal.) Broth.
- Homalothecium longicuspis Broth.
- Homalothecium luteolum Jaeger, 1878
- Homalothecium lutescens H.Robinson, 1962
- Homalothecium mandonii (Mitt.) Geh.
- Homalothecium meridionale (M.Fleisch. & Warnst.) Hedenäs
- Homalothecium neckeroides Paris, 1896
- Homalothecium nevadense Renauld & Cardot, 1888
- Homalothecium nuttallii Jaeger, 1878
- Homalothecium philippeanum W.P.Schimper, 1851
- Homalothecium pseudosericeum (Müll.Hal.) A.Jaeger
- Homalothecium sericeum (Hedw.) Schimp., 1851
- Homalothecium subcapillatum (Hedw.) Sull.
- Homalothecium tenerrimum (Müll.Hal.) A.Jaeger
