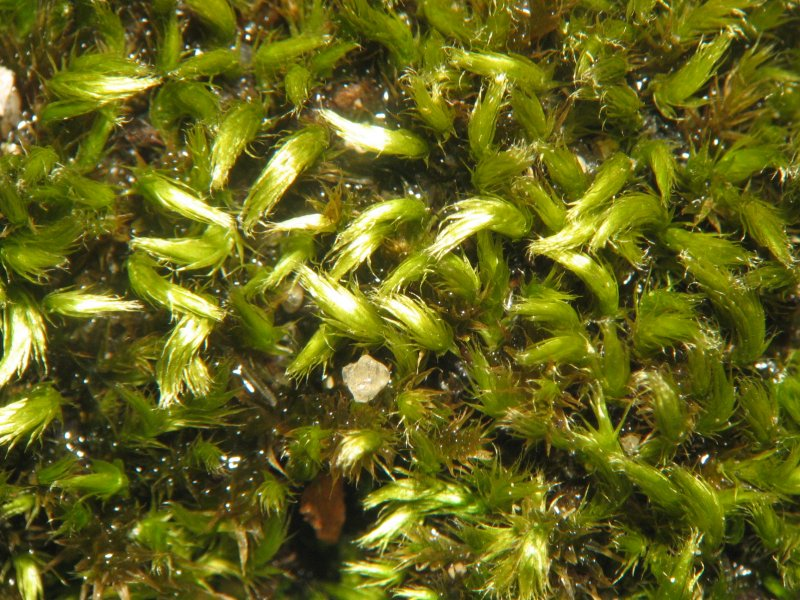

Scientific classification
- Kingdom: Plantae
- Division: Bryophyta
- Class: Bryopsida
- Subclass: Bryidae
- Order: Hypnales
- Family: Brachytheciaceae
- Genus: Homalothecium
- Species: H. sericeum

Binomial name
- Homalothecium sericeum W.P.Schimper, 1851

= Homalothecium sericeum =

Species of moss

Homalothecium sericeum is a species of moss belonging to the family Brachytheciaceae.

It has almost cosmopolitan distribution.
