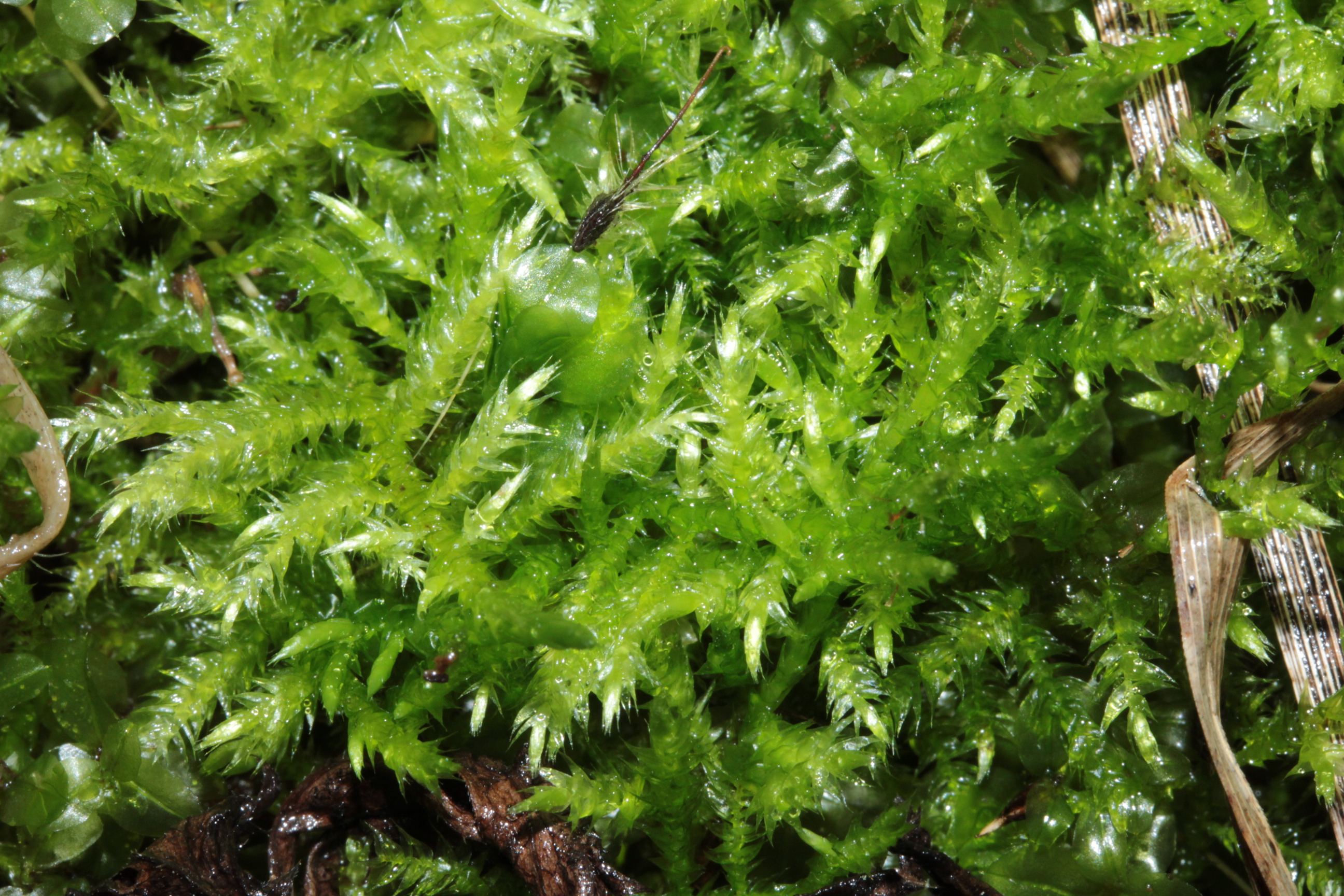

Scientific classification
- Kingdom: Plantae
- Division: Bryophyta
- Class: Bryopsida
- Subclass: Bryidae
- Order: Hypnales
- Family: Brachytheciaceae
- Genus: Brachythecium
- Species: B. mildeanum

Binomial name
- Brachythecium mildeanum (Schimp.) Schimp.

= Brachythecium mildeanum =

Species of moss

Brachythecium mildeanum is a species of moss belonging to the family Brachytheciaceae.

It has cosmopolitan distribution.
