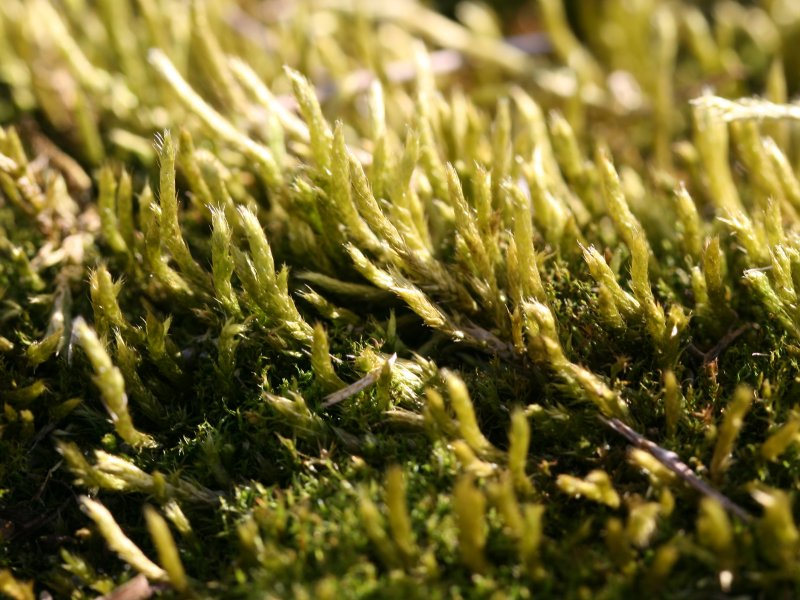

Conservation status
- Least Concern (IUCN 3.1)

Scientific classification
- Kingdom: Plantae
- Division: Bryophyta
- Class: Bryopsida
- Subclass: Bryidae
- Order: Hypnales
- Family: Brachytheciaceae
- Genus: Brachythecium
- Species: B. salebrosum

Binomial name
- Brachythecium salebrosum W.P.Schimper, 1853

Synonyms
- Brachythecium ligusticum De Not.; Brachythecium plumosum Huds.; Brachythecium plumosum Huds. ex C.E.O.Jensen; Brachythecium pseudocollinum Kindb.; Brachythecium salebrosum (Web. & Mohr) Br.Eur.; Brachythecium salebrosum var. arcticum Berggr.; Brachythecium salebrosum var. flaccidum Schimp.; Brachythecium salebrosum var. gracile (Hartm.) Paris; Brachythecium salebrosum var. homomallum G.Roth; Brachythecium salebrosum var. palustre Schimp.; Brachythecium salebrosum var. robustum Warnst.; Brachythecium salebrosum var. salebrosum (F.Weber & D.Mohr) Schimp.; Brachythecium salebrosum var. turgidum (Hartm.) J.E.Zett.; Brachythecium salebrosum var. vineale (Milde) Podp.; Brachythecium vineale Milde; Brachythecium zickendrahtii Warnst.; Chamberlainia salebrosa (Hoffm. ex F.Web. & D.Mohr) H.Rob.; Hypnum salebrosum Hoffm.; Hypnum salebrosum Hoffm. ex F.Weber & D.Mohr; Hypnum salebrosum var. gracile Hartm.; Lescuraea affinis (Limpr.) Broth.; Ptychodium affine Limpr.

= Brachythecium salebrosum =

Species of plant

Brachythecium salebrosum is a species of moss in the Brachytheciaceae family. It is widely distributed throughout the world, except for in South-America and in tropical regions.

Brachythecium salebrosum is known to be able to use artificial light to grow in places which are otherwise devoid of natural light, such as Crystal Cave in Wisconsin.
