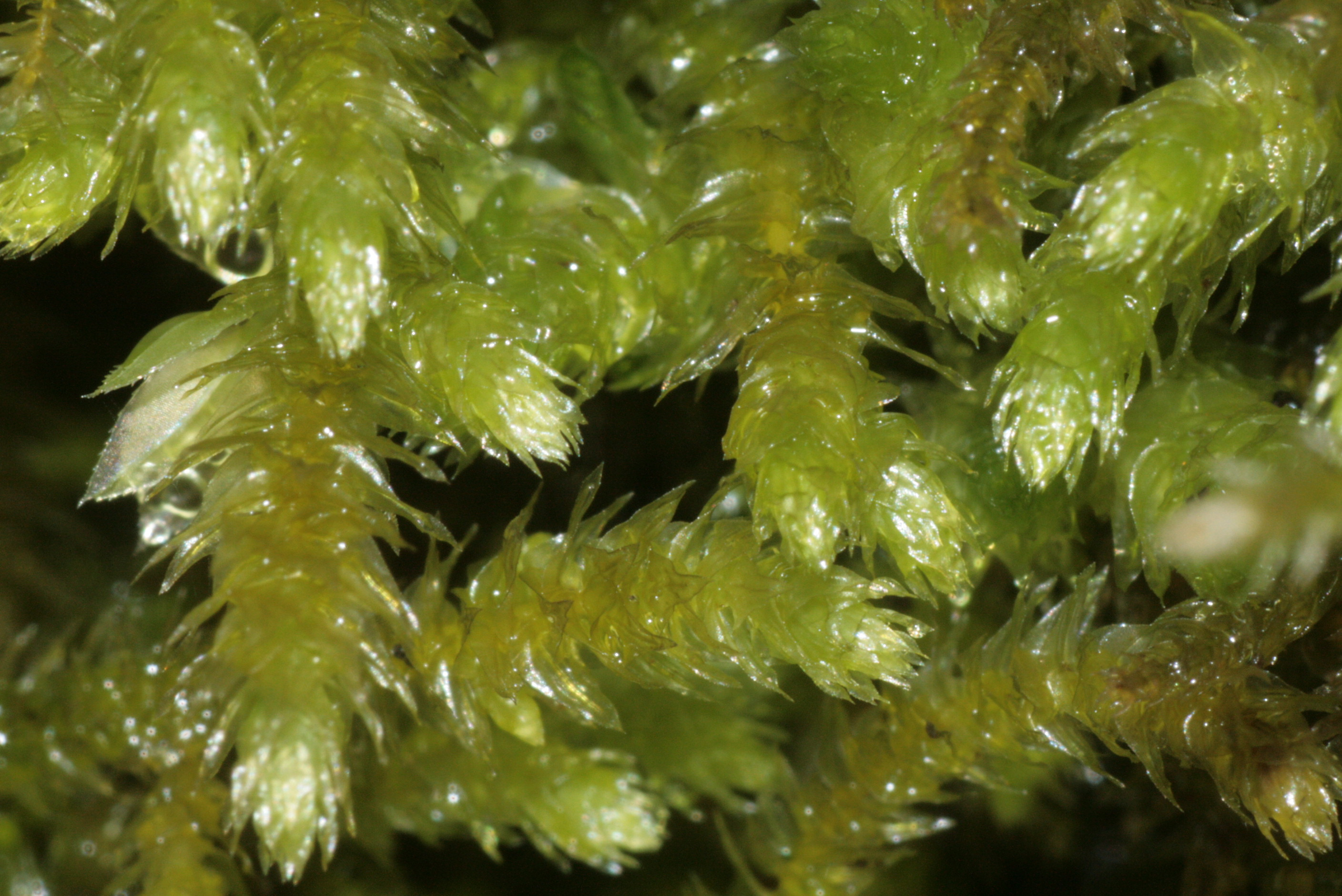

Scientific classification
- Kingdom: Plantae
- Division: Bryophyta
- Class: Bryopsida
- Subclass: Bryidae
- Order: Hypnales
- Family: Brachytheciaceae
- Genus: Eurhynchium
- Species: E. striatum

Binomial name
- Eurhynchium striatum W.P.Schimper, 1856

= Eurhynchium striatum =

Species of moss

Eurhynchium striatum is a species of moss belonging to the family Brachytheciaceae.

It is native to Europe.
