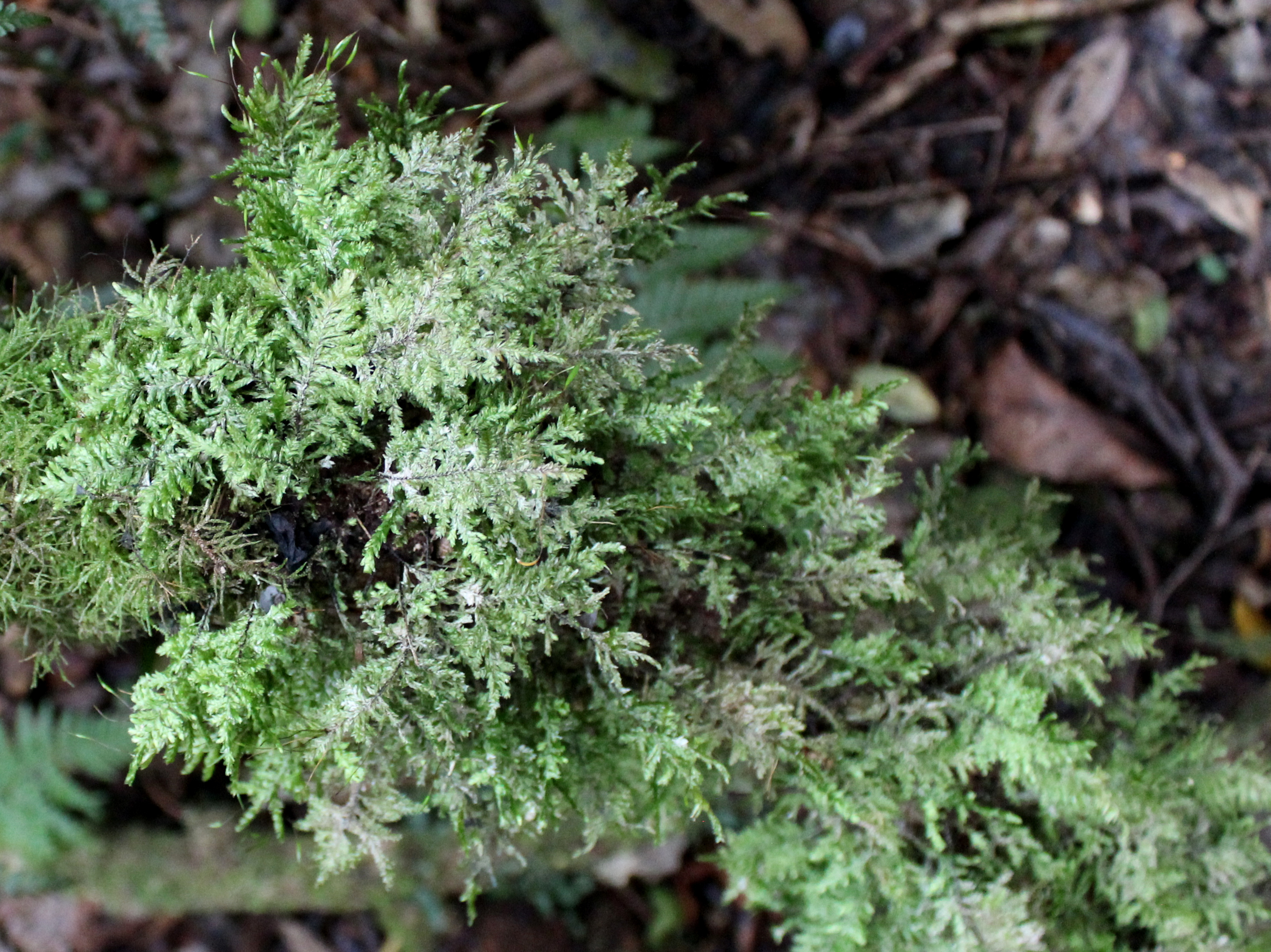
- Eurhynchium praelongum

Scientific classification
- Kingdom: Plantae
- Division: Bryophyta
- Class: Bryopsida
- Subclass: Bryidae
- Order: Hypnales
- Family: Brachytheciaceae
- Genus: Eurhynchium; Schimp.

= Eurhynchium =

Genus of mosses

Eurhynchium is a genus of mosses belonging to the family Brachytheciaceae.

The genus was first described by Bruch and Wilhelm Philippe Schimper in 1854.

The genus has cosmopolitan distribution.

Species:

- Eurhynchium angustirete
- Eurhynchium praelongum
- Eurhynchium pulchellum
- Eurhynchium striatum
- Eurhynchium swartzii
