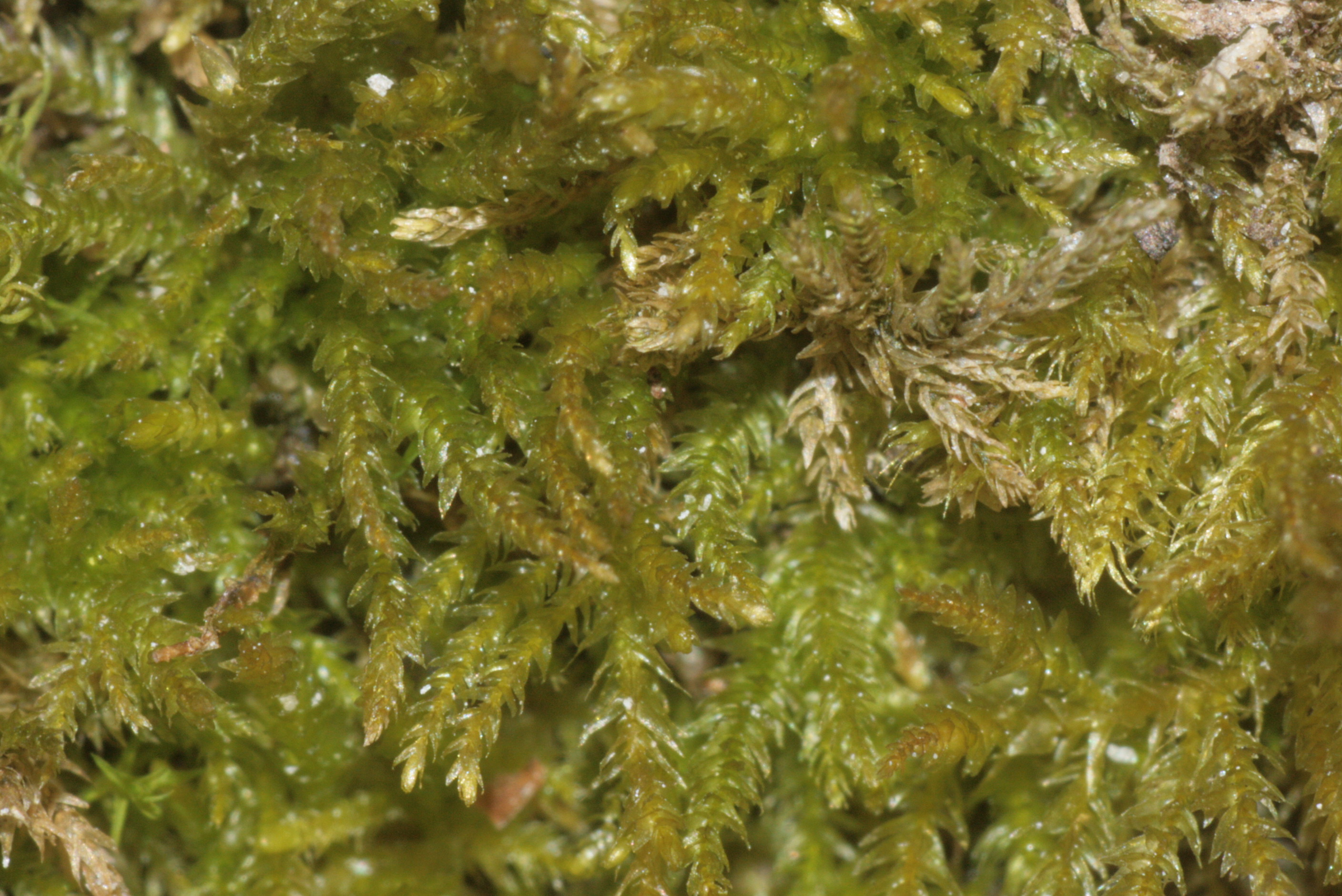
- Eurhynchiastrum pulchellum

Scientific classification
- Kingdom: Plantae
- Division: Bryophyta
- Class: Bryopsida
- Subclass: Bryidae
- Order: Hypnales
- Family: Brachytheciaceae
- Genus: Eurhynchiastrum; Ignatov & Huttunen
- Species: E. pulchellum

Binomial name
- Eurhynchiastrum pulchellum (Hedwig) Ignatov & Huttunen

= Eurhynchiastrum =

Genus of mosses

Eurhynchiastrum pulchellum is a species of mosses belonging to the family Brachytheciaceae. It is the sole species of the genus Eurhynchiastrum.

The species is found in temperate to arctic environments in Africa, Eurasia and America.
