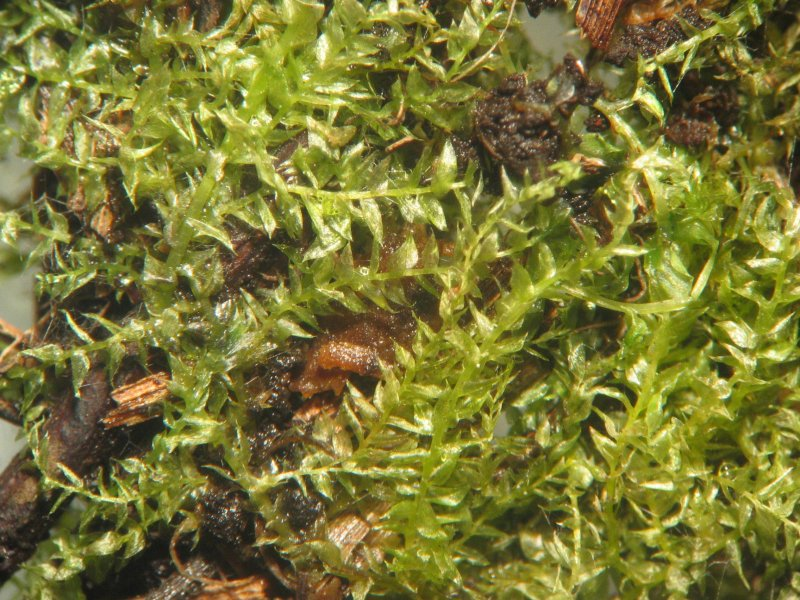

Conservation status
- Secure (NatureServe)

Scientific classification
- Kingdom: Plantae
- Division: Bryophyta
- Class: Bryopsida
- Subclass: Bryidae
- Order: Hypnales
- Family: Brachytheciaceae
- Genus: Oxyrrhynchium
- Species: O. hians

Binomial name
- Oxyrrhynchium hians (Hedw.) Loeske

Synonyms
- Eurhynchium rappii (Williams) Grout; Hypnum hians Hedw.; Oxyrrhynchium hians subsp. rappii (R.S. Williams) Wijk & Margad.; Oxyrrhynchium rappii R.S. Williams; Rhynchostegium hians (Hedw.) Delogne

= Oxyrrhynchium hians =

Species of moss

Oxyrrhynchium hians, also known as Swartz's feather-moss or light beaked moss, is a species of moss in the family Brachytheciaceae.

== Description ==
This moss has a highly variable phenotype in terms of density and leaf shape.

== Range ==
This plant is found globally. In North America, it is almost absent in the West.

== Taxonomy ==
Oxyrrhynchium hians contains the following subspecies:

- Oxyrrhynchium hians subsp. rappii
- Oxyrrhynchium hians subsp. hians
