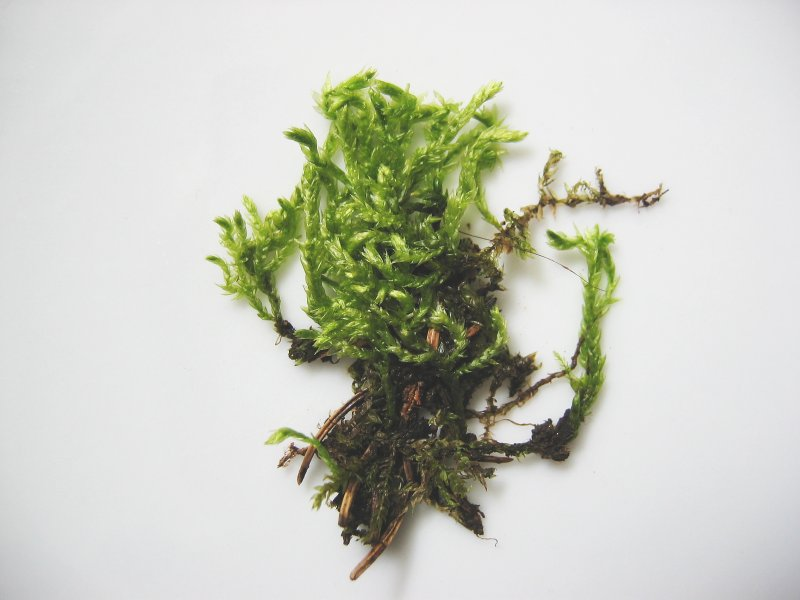

Scientific classification
- Kingdom: Plantae
- Division: Bryophyta
- Class: Bryopsida
- Subclass: Bryidae
- Order: Hypnales
- Family: Brachytheciaceae
- Genus: Rhynchostegium
- Species: R. murale

Binomial name
- Rhynchostegium murale W.P.Schimper, 1852

= Rhynchostegium murale =

Species of moss

Rhynchostegium murale is a species of moss belonging to the family Brachytheciaceae and native to Europe and eastern Asia.
