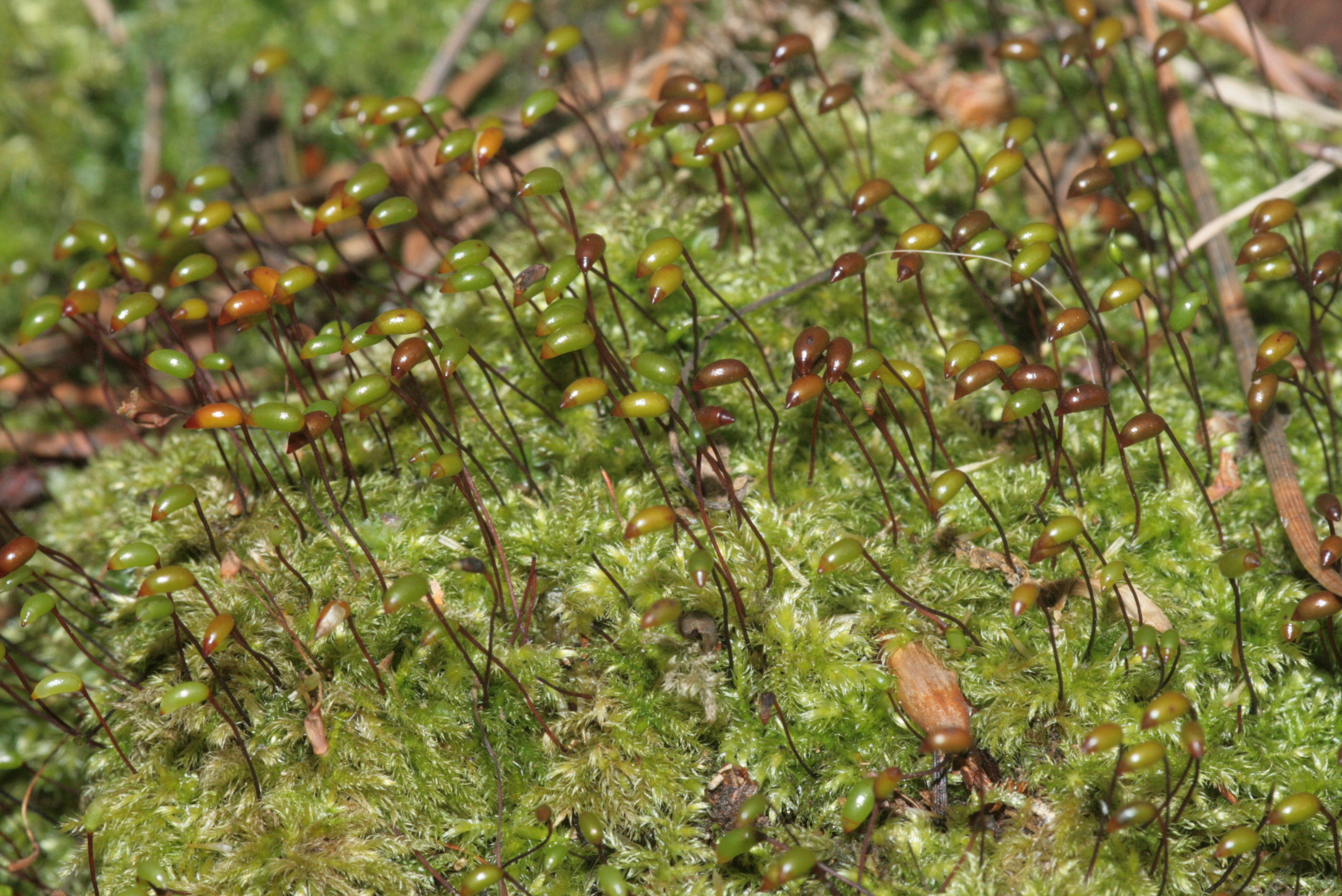
- Brachytheciastrum velutinum

Scientific classification
- Kingdom: Plantae
- Division: Bryophyta
- Class: Bryopsida
- Subclass: Bryidae
- Order: Hypnales
- Family: Brachytheciaceae
- Genus: Brachytheciastrum; Ignatov & Huttunen

= Brachytheciastrum =

Genus of mosses

Brachytheciastrum is a genus of mosses belonging to the family Brachytheciaceae.

The genus was first described by Ignatov and Huttunen.

The genus has almost cosmopolitan distribution.
