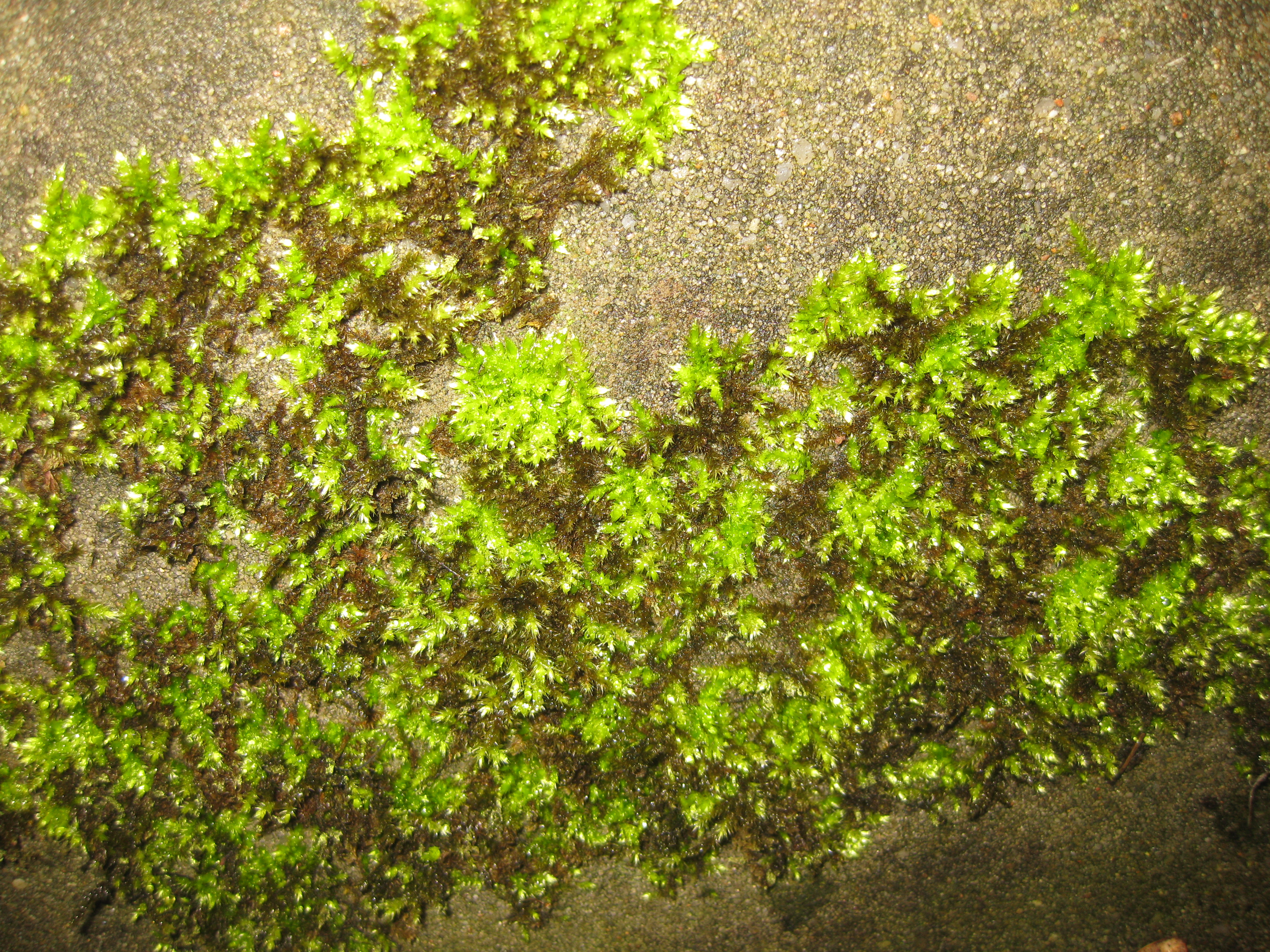
- Brachythecium rutabulum

Scientific classification
- Kingdom: Plantae
- Division: Bryophyta
- Class: Bryopsida
- Subclass: Bryidae
- Order: Hypnales
- Family: Brachytheciaceae
- Genus: Brachythecium; Schimp.

Synonyms
- Chamberlainia Grout; Streblopilum Ångström

= Brachythecium =

Genus of mosses

Brachythecium is a genus of mosses belonging to the family Brachytheciaceae. The genus was first described by Wilhelm Philippe Schimper.

== Species ==
The following species are recognised in the genus Brachythecium:

- Brachythecium albicans
- Brachythecium campestre
- Brachythecium erythrorrhizon
- Brachythecium glareosum
- Brachythecium latifolium
- Brachythecium mildeanum
- Brachythecium populeum
- Brachythecium reflexum
- Brachythecium rivulare
- Brachythecium rutabulum
- Brachythecium salebrosum
- Brachythecium tommasinii
- Brachythecium turgidum
- Brachythecium velutinum
