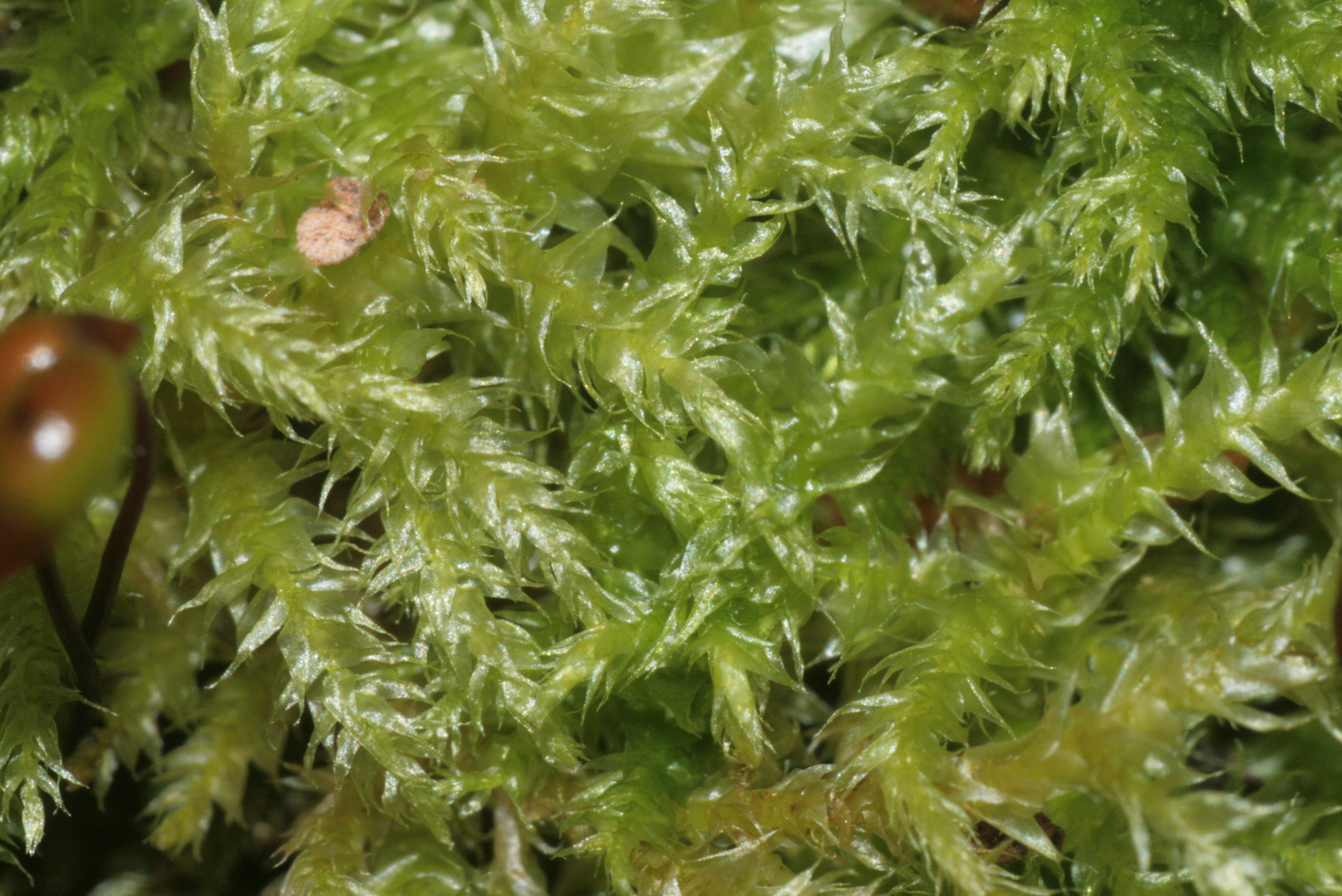
- Sciurohypnum starkei

Scientific classification
- Kingdom: Plantae
- Division: Bryophyta
- Class: Bryopsida
- Subclass: Bryidae
- Order: Hypnales
- Family: Brachytheciaceae
- Genus: Sciurohypnum; Hampe

= Sciurohypnum =

Genus of mosses

Sciurohypnum, or Sciuro-hypnum, is a genus of mosses belonging to the family Brachytheciaceae.

== Species ==
The following species are recognised in the genus Sciurohypnum:

- Sciurohypnum brotheri (Paris) Ignatov & Huttunen
- Sciurohypnum curtum (Lindb.) Ignatov
- Sciurohypnum dovrense (Limpr.) Draper & Hedenäs
- Sciurohypnum filirepens (Dusén) Ochyra & Żarnowiec
- Sciurohypnum flotowianum (Sendtn.) Ignatov & Huttunen
- Sciurohypnum fuegianum (Broth.) Ochyra & Żarnowiec
- Sciurohypnum glaciale (Schimp.) Ignatov & Huttunen
- Sciurohypnum latifolium (Kindb.) Ignatov & Huttunen
- Sciurohypnum majusculum (M.E.Newton) Ignatov & Huttunen
- Sciurohypnum oedipodium (Mitt.) Ignatov & Huttunen
- Sciurohypnum ornellanum (Molendo) Ignatov & Huttunen
- Sciurohypnum plumosum (Hedw.) Ignatov & Huttunen
- Sciurohypnum populeum (Hedw.) Ignatov & Huttunen
- Sciurohypnum printzii (Kaal.) Ochyra & Stebel
- Sciurohypnum reflexum (Starke) Ignatov & Huttunen
- Sciurohypnum starkei (Brid.) Ignatov & Huttunen
- Sciurohypnum tromsoeense (Kaurin & Arnell) Draper & Hedenäs
- Sciurohypnum uematsui (Broth.) Ochyra & Żarnowiec
- Sciurohypnum uncinifolium (Broth. & Paris) Ochyra & Żarnowiec
