= Remyella (plant) =

Scientific classification
- Kingdom: Plantae
- Division: Bryophyta
- Class: Bryopsida
- Subclass: Bryidae
- Order: Hypnales
- Family: Brachytheciaceae
- Genus: Remyella; Müll. Hal.

Genus of mosses

Remyella is a genus of mosses belonging to the family Brachytheciaceae.

Species:

- Remyella hawaica Müll.Hal.
- Remyella ramicola (Broth.) Ignatov & Huttunen
- Remyella vriesei (Dozy & Molk.) Ignatov & Huttunen
