= Platyhypnidium =

Scientific classification
- Kingdom: Plantae
- Division: Bryophyta
- Class: Bryopsida
- Subclass: Bryidae
- Order: Hypnales
- Family: Brachytheciaceae
- Genus: Platyhypnidium; M.Fleisch.

Genus of mosses

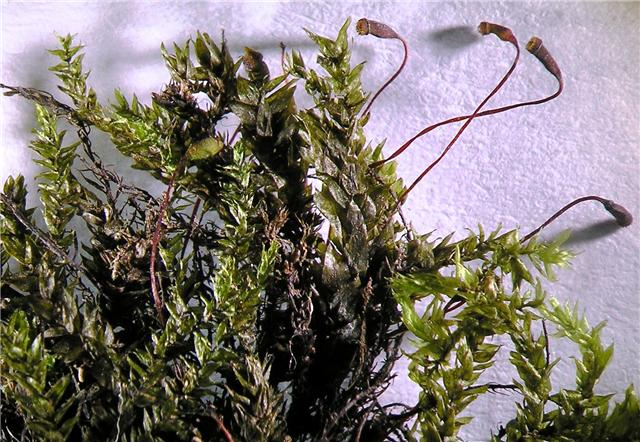
Platyhypnidium riparioides

Platyhypnidium is a genus of mosses belonging to the family Brachytheciaceae.

The genus has cosmopolitan distribution.

Species:

- Platyhypnidium aquaticum Fleischer, 1923
- Platyhypnidium austrinum Fleischer, 1923
