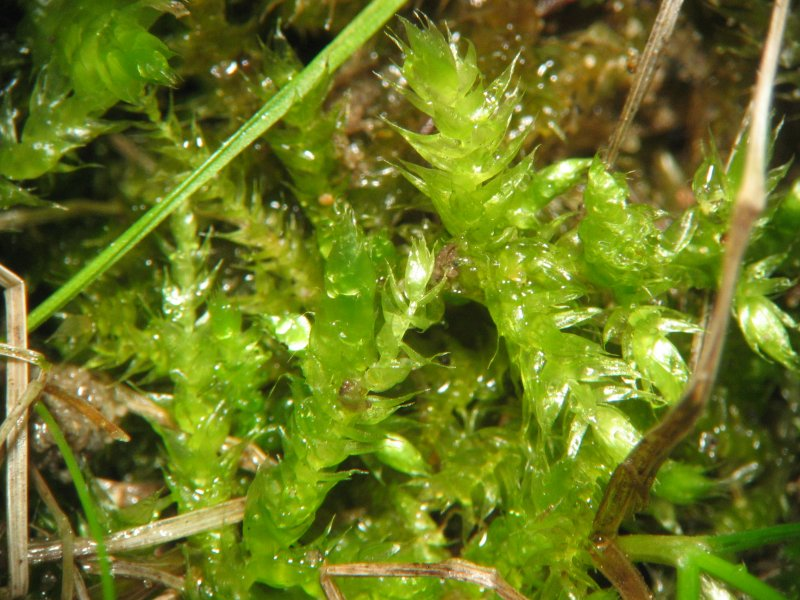
- Brachythecium rutabulum

Scientific classification
- Kingdom: Plantae
- Division: Bryophyta
- Class: Bryopsida
- Subclass: Bryidae
- Order: Hypnales
- Family: Brachytheciaceae; Schimp.

Genera
- See text

= Brachytheciaceae =

Family of mosses

Brachytheciaceae is a family of mosses from the order Hypnales. The family includes over 40 genera and 250 species.

== Description ==
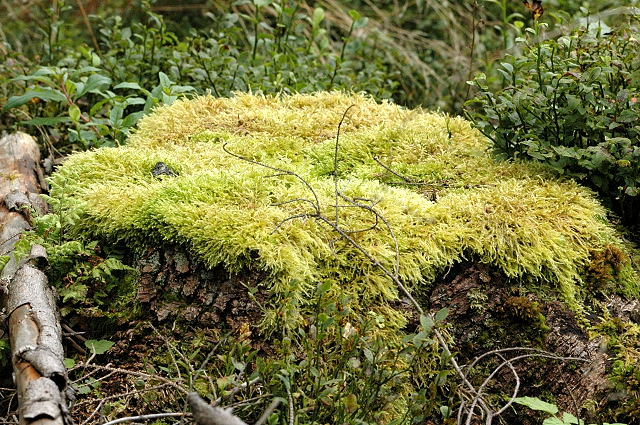
Brachythecium velutinum forming a dense mat.

The family consists of pleurocarpous mosses with very diverse appearances. They are irregular or pinnately branched and form loose mats. The leaves are broad ovate or triangular and are sharply focused at the top. A midrib is always present and usually reaches more than half of the leaf. The leaf cells are prosenchymatous and are many times longer than wide and interlocking with pointed ends.

The sporophyte consists of a regularly formed spore capsule that stands straight on the setae. The spores are distributed through an annular peristome, which is closed off by a beak-shaped operculum in immature plants.

== Habitat ==
Species are terrestrial, epiphytic, or lithophytic plants that are distributed around the world. They grow on various substrates, including rock, bark, and soil.

== Taxonomy ==
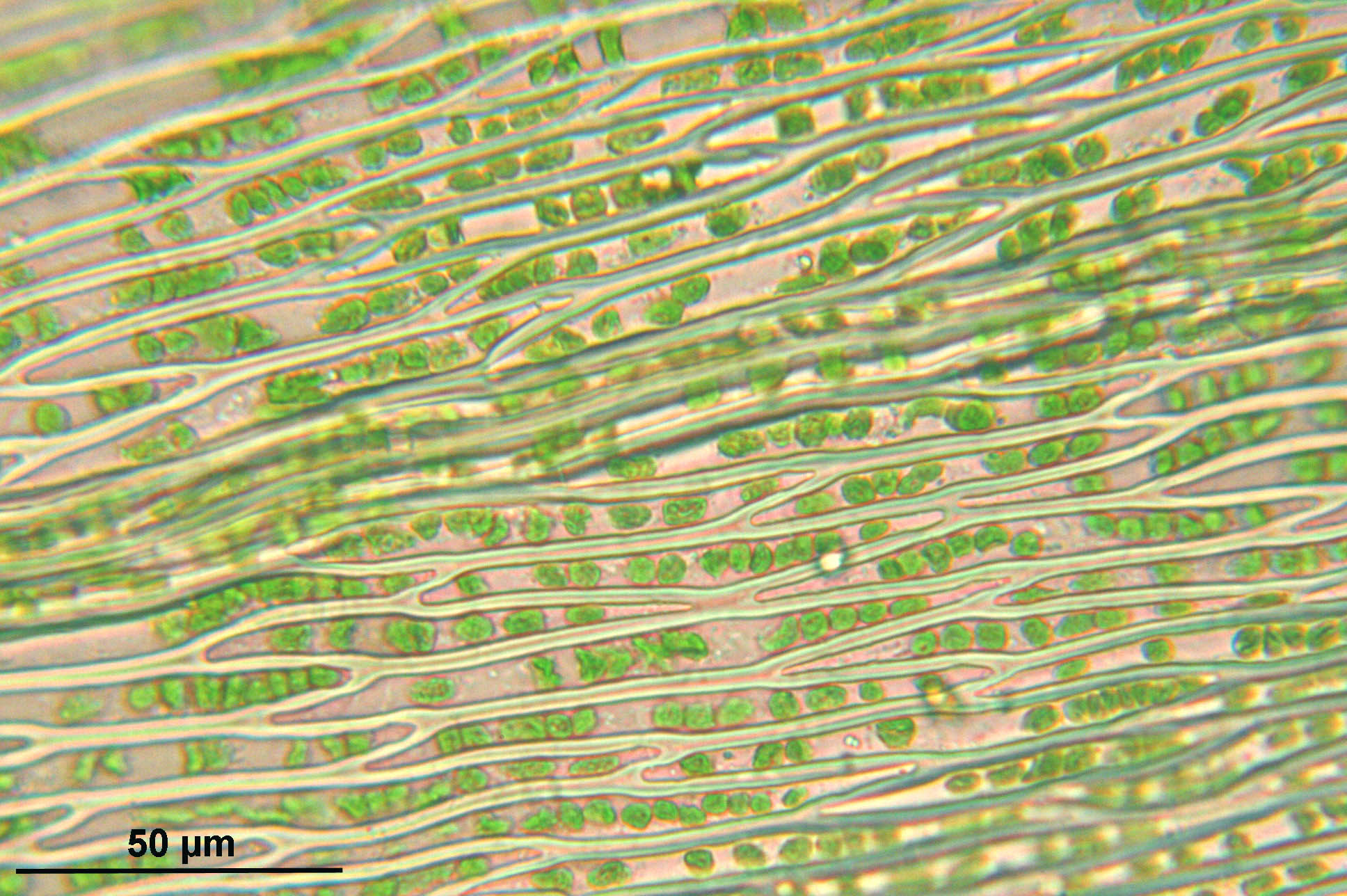
Brachythecium rivulare with prosenchymatous leaf cells.

Brachytheciaceae is in the order Hypnales. They are a sister group of the Meteoriaceae. The family is divided into four subfamilies, which are distinguished on the basis of molecular research.

- Family: Brachytheciaceae
  - Subfamily Eurhychioideae
    - Genus: Aerobryum · Bryoandersonia · Eriodon · Eurhynchium · Palamocladium · Plasteurhynchium · Platyhypnidium · Pseudoscleropodium · Rhynchostegium · Scorpiurum
  - Subfamily Helicodontoideae
    - Genus: Aerolindigia · Cirriphyllum · Clasmatodon · Donrichardsia · Eurhynchiella · †Flabellidium · Helicodontium · Homalotheciella · Juratzkaeella · Mandoniella · Meteoridium · Nobregaea · Okamuraea · Oxyrrhynchium · Remyella · Rhynchostegiella · Schimperella · Squamidium · Zelometeorium
  - Subfamily Homalothecioideae
    - Genus: Brachytheciastrum · Homalothecium · Eurhynchiastrum
  - Subfamily Brachythedioideae
    - Genus: Brachytheciella · Brachythecium · Bryhnia · Eurhynchiadelphus · Kindbergia · Myuroclada · Sciurohypnum · Scleropodium · Unclejackia

Other genera are provisionally placed in the family, including:

- Bryostreimannia Ochyra 1991
- Frahmiella
- Lindigia
- Stenocarpidiopsis
- Stokesiella (Kindb.) H.Rob.
- Streimannia Ochyra 1990
