= Flora of the South Sandwich Islands =

This is a list of the flora of the South Sandwich Islands, a group of islands in the subantarctic Atlantic Ocean, part of the British overseas territory of South Georgia and the South Sandwich Islands. The list contains flora in the strict sense; that is, plants only. It comprises a single species of vascular plant, 38 mosses, and 11 liverworts. Unusually, not a single species is known to have naturalised on the islands; all are presumed native.

The islands also contain 5 species of fungus, 41 lichens and 16 diatoms.

== Vascular plants ==
- Deschampsia antarctica

== Mosses ==
- Andreaea gainii
- Andreaea regularis
- Anisothecium hookeri
- Bartramia patens
- Bracythecium austrosalebrosum
- Bracythecium fuegianum
- Bracythecium glaciale
- Bryum argenteum
- Bryum dichotomum
- Bryum orbiculatifolium
- Bryum pseudomicron
- Bryum pseudotriquetrum
- Campylopus introflexus
- Campylopus spiralis
- Ceratodon purpureus
- Dicranella hilariana
- Dicranoweisia brevipes
- Dicranoweisia grimmiacea
- Ditrichum gemmiferum
- Ditrichum heteromallum
- Ditrichum hyalinum
- Ditrichum lewis-smithii
- Hennediella antarctica
- Kiaeria pumila
- Notoligotrichum trichodon
- Pohlia drummondii
- Pohlia nutans
- Polytrichastrum alpinum
- Polytrichum juniperinum
- Polytrichum piliferum
- Polytrichum strictum
- Racomitrium orthotrichaceum
- Racomitrium sudeticum
- Sanionia georgico-uncinata
- Sanionia uncinata
- Schizymenium austrogeorgicum
- Syntrichia filaris
- Syntrichia princeps

== Liverworts ==
- Cephalozia badia
- Cephaloziella varians
- Clasmatocolea rigens
- Cryptochila grandiflora
- Lepidozia chordulifera
- Lophocoela lenta
- Lophozia chordulifera
- Marchantia berteroana
- Pachyglossa dissitifolia
- Riccardia georgiensis
- Triandrophyllum subtrifidum
