= A. nivalis =

A. nivalis may refer to:

- Amanita nivalis, a toxic mushroom species in the genus Amanita
- Andreaea nivalis, a moss species in the genus Andreaea
