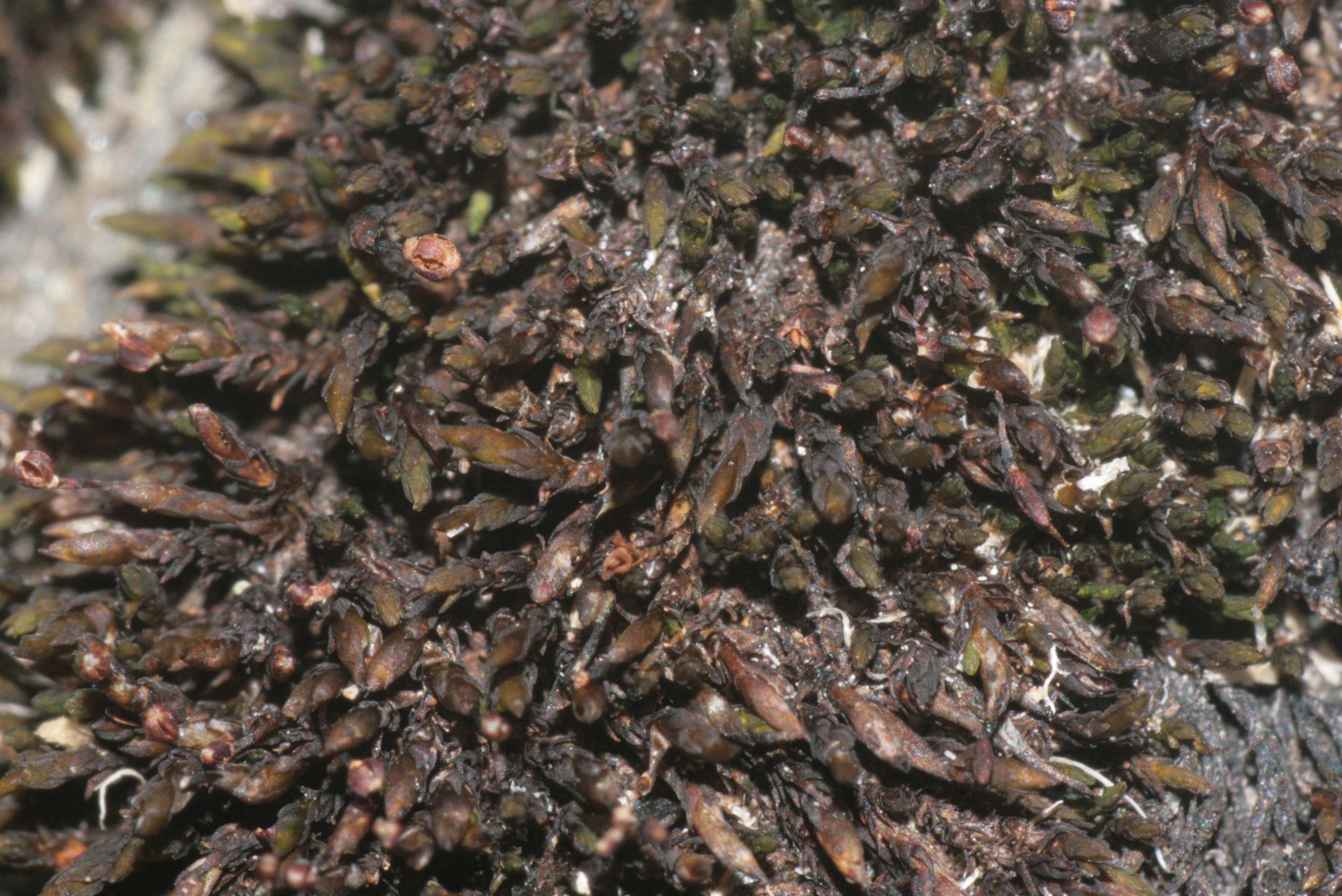

Conservation status
- Least Concern (IUCN 3.1) (Europe regional assessment)

- Secure (NatureServe)

Scientific classification
- Kingdom: Plantae
- Division: Bryophyta
- Subdivision: Andreaeophytina
- Class: Andreaeopsida
- Order: Andreaeales
- Family: Andreaeaceae
- Genus: Andreaea
- Species: A. rupestris

Binomial name
- Andreaea rupestris Hedw.

Synonyms
- List: Andreaea alpina Roth; Andreaea alpina var. subsecunda Wahlenb.; Andreaea petrophila Ehrh. ex Fürnr.; Andreaea petrophila subsp. rupestris (Hedw.) Wallr.; Andreaea petrophila var. homomalla Thed.; Andreaea petrophila var. vulgaris Hartm.; Andreaea turgescens Schimp. ex Müll.Hal.; Andreaea petrophila var. acuminata Schimp.; Andreaea petrophila var. alpicola Schimp.; Andreaea petrophila var. flaccida Schimp.; Andreaea petrophila var. gracilis Schimp.; Andreaea petrophila var. pygmaea Schimp.; Andreaea petrophila var. squarrulosa Schimp.; Andreaea petrophila var. sylvicola Schimp.; Andreaea striata Mitt.; Andreaea rupestris var. rubicunda (E.B.Bartram) Z.Iwats.; Andreaea assimilis Müll.Hal.; Andreaea compacta Müll.Hal.; Andreaea cuspidata Müll.Hal.; Andreaea filiformis Müll.Hal.; Andreaea patens Müll.Hal.; Andreaea petrophila var. affinis Kindb.; Andreaea parvifolia Müll.Hal.; Andreaea gibbosa R.Br.bis; Andreaea minuta R.Br.bis; Andreaea sparsifolia var. sublaevis Kindb.; Andreaea wrightii R.Br.bis; Andreaea petrophila subsp. sublaevis (Kindb.) Kindb.; Andreaea petrophila subsp. subsparsifolia Kindb.; Andreaea microphylla Müll.Hal.; Andreaea spurioalpina Müll.Hal.; Andreaea squarrosofiliformis Müll.Hal.; Andreaea petrophila var. minutula Podp.; Andreaea spurioalpina var. rubricalyx Müll.Hal.; Andreaea papillosa subsp. subsparsifolia (Kindb.) Paris; Andreaea petrophila var. parvifolia (Müll.Hal.) R.S.Williams; Andreaea papillosa subsp. sublaevis (Kindb.) Paris; Andreaea petrophila var. subalpestris Loeske; Andreaea amurensis Broth.; Andreaea perpapillosa Broth.; Andreaea petrophila f. rupestris (Hedw.) Mönk.; Andreaea rupestris var. acuminata (Schimp.) Sharp; Andreaea petrophila var. rubicunda E.B.Bartram; Andreaea rupestris var. sylvicola (Schimp.) Demaret; Andreaea rupestris var. gracilis (Schimp.) P.W.Richards & E.C.Wallace; Andreaea rupestris f. flaccida (Schimp.) Podp.; Andreaea rupestris f. gracilis (Schimp.) Podp.; Andreaea rupestris f. homomalla (Thed.) Podp.; Andreaea rupestris f. minutula (Podp.) Podp.; Andreaea rupestris f. subsparsifolia (Kindb.) Podp.; Andreaea rupestris f. sylvicola (Schimp.) Podp.; Andreaea rupestris var. hulubyi Pilous; Andreaea rupestris f. acuminata (Schimp.) Podp.; Andreaea rupestris f. squarrulosa (Schimp.) Podp.; Andreaea likiangensis P.C.Chen & T.L.Wan; Andreaea petrophila f. acuminata (Schimp.) Mönk.; Andreaea petrophila f. flaccida (Schimp.) Mönk.; Andreaea petrophila f. gracilis (Schimp.) Mönk.; Andreaea petrophila f. pygmaea (Schimp.) Mönk.; Andreaea petrophila f. squarrulosa (Schimp.) Mönk.; Andreaea rupestris f. subalpestris (Loeske) Podp.; Andreaea rupestris var. acutifolia Hook. & Wilson; Andreaea petrophila var. ambigua Mitt. & Wilson; Andreaea petrophila var. levis Bott. ex Zodda; Andreaea petrophila var. obtusata Warnst.; Andreaea petrophila var. subsecunda (Wahlenb.) Norrl.; Andreaea rupestris subsp. rupestris

= Andreaea rupestris =

Species of moss

Andreaea rupestris is a species of moss in the class Andreaeopsida, are commonly referred to as the "lantern mosses" due to the appearance of their dehisced sporangia. It is typically found on smooth, acidic, exposed rock in the Northern hemisphere. It exhibits the common features of the genus Andreaea such as being acrocarpous, having dark pigmentation, lacking a seta, and bearing 4 lines of dehiscence in its mature sporangia, but can be further identified upon careful examination of its gametophytic leaves which have an ovate base to a more blunt apex compared to other similar species.

== Taxonomy and classification ==
Andreaea rupestris is in the genus Andreaea, which has around 100 different species.

It may be difficult to differentiate A. rupestris from some other species in its genus as it does bear some similar characteristics to other species. Some species which may be mistaken for A. rupestris are:

- A. rothii, which has a similar habitat to A. rupestris but its leaves are nerved, and they are falcate-secund in both moist and dry conditions (A. rupestris is only falcate-secund in moist conditions).
- A. mutabilis, which has a similar appearance but has a yellow leaf bases, which are more widely spread apart.
- A. alpestris and A. sinuosa, which can only be differentiated from A. rupestris using a microscope.
- A. megistospora, which has a similar habitat to A. rupestris and can only be differentiated by the size of its spores, and its nerved leaves.

== Description ==
The appearance of Andreaea rupestris is dark in colour, varying from dark red/brown/green to black depending on its life stage. It grows in patches of dense, cushion-like tufts up to 2–3 cm high and has imbricate leaves in dry conditions. In moist conditions, the leaves may be falcate-secund (curved to one side) yet this does not always hold true. Unlike some other mosses, A. rupestris have biseriate rhizoids which aid in attaching the gametophyte to substrate.

=== Gametophyte ===
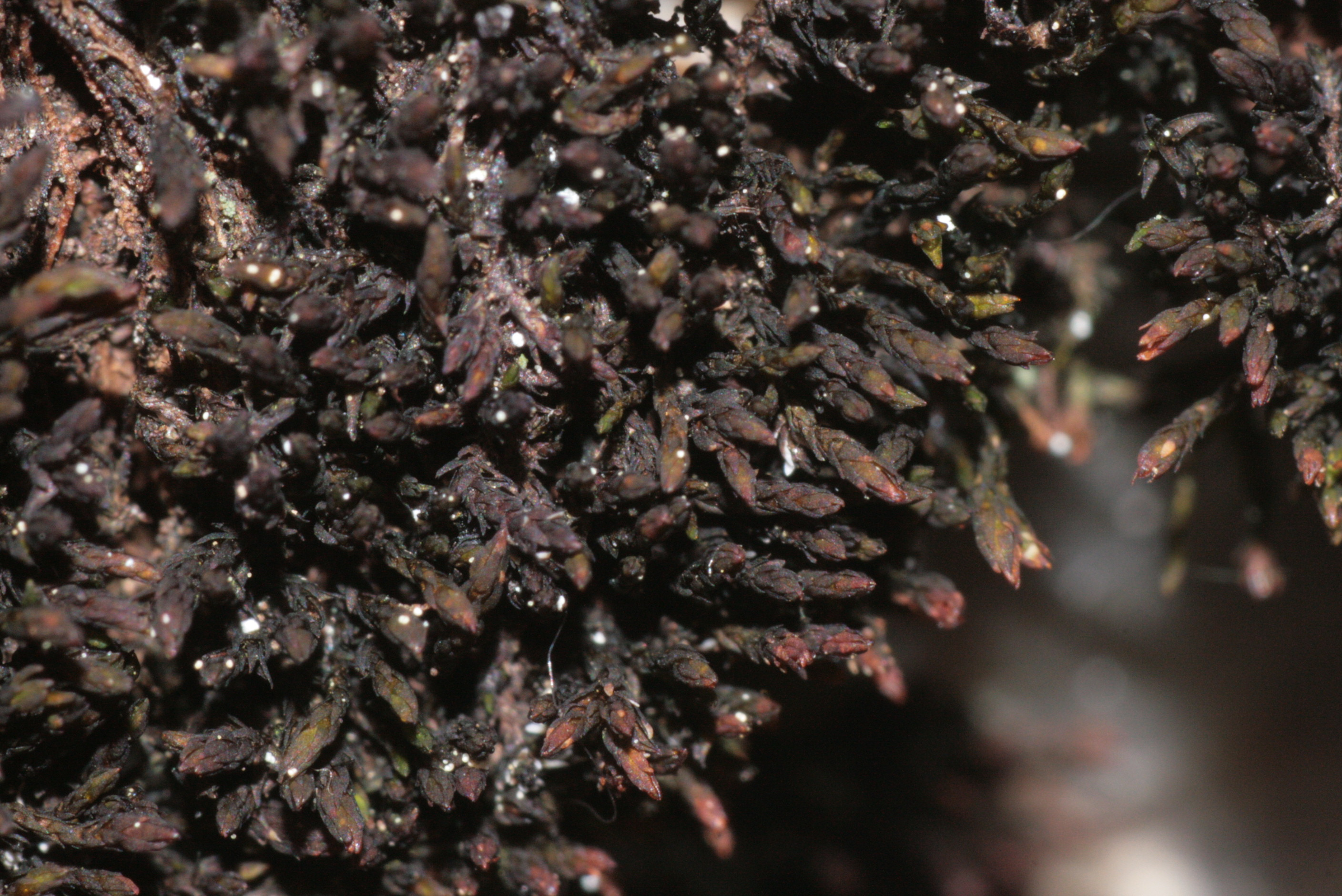
Andreaea rupestris

The gametophyte leaves have an ovate base tapering to a blunt to acute apex and are less than 1mm in length. They lack a costa and may have papillae on the dorsal side, particularly on the upper leaves of the stem. The leaves are bordered by shorter, rhombic marginal cells and their laminal cells have thickened cell walls. Their perichaetial leaves are typically larger than their stem leaves. In contrast to most bryophytes which have a filamentous protonemal stage, Andreaea rupestris have thalloid protonema that give rise to the leafy shoot of the gametophyte.

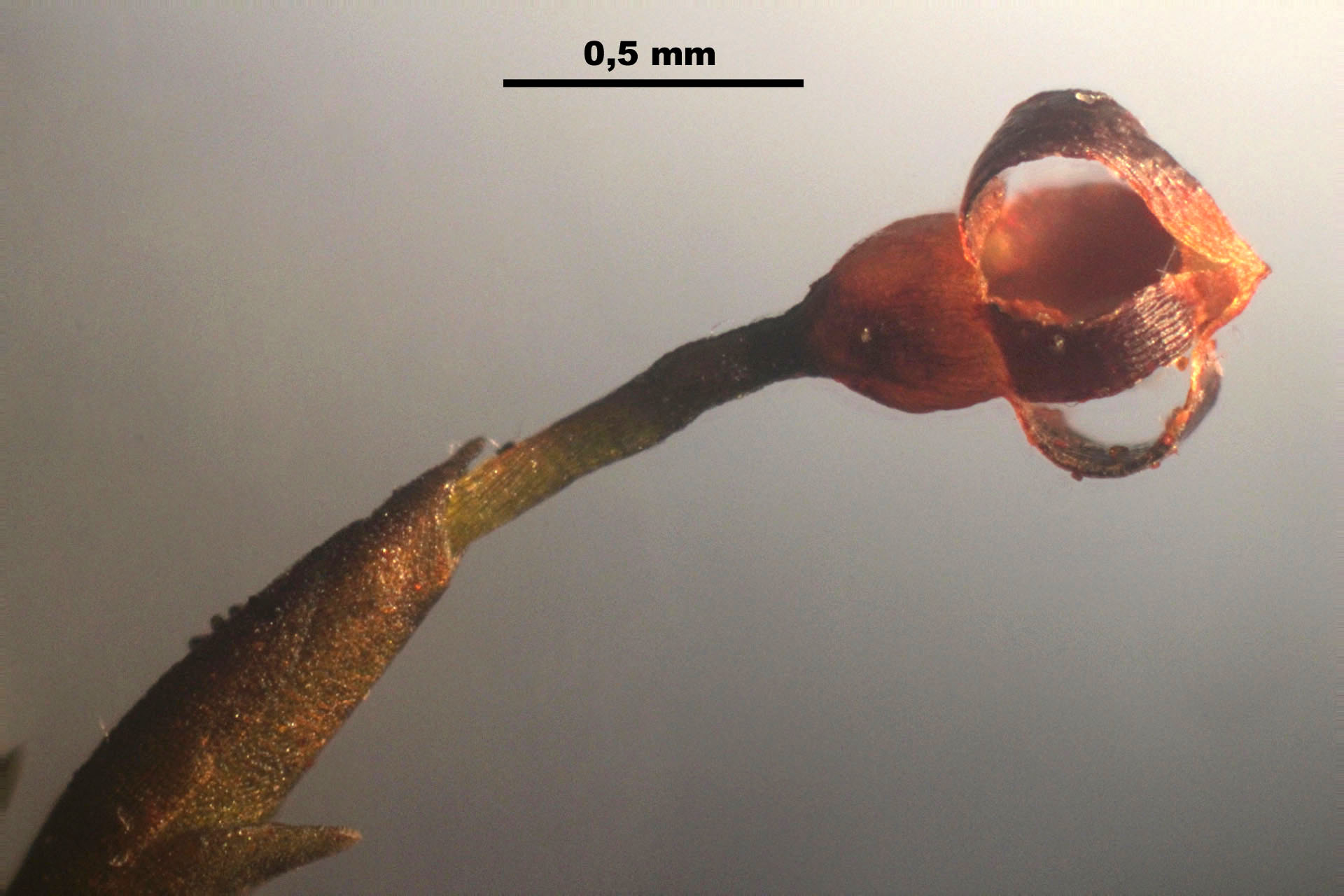
Dehisced mature sporangium attached to the pseudopodium

=== Sporophyte ===
As characterized by the Andreaeopsida, Andreaea rupestris have small sporophytes which lack both an operculum and a seta. Instead of a seta, they have a pseudopodium derived from gametophytic tissue attached to the sporangium, extending from the perichaetium attached by a structure called the foot. Once fully mature, the sporangium will open along 4 vertical lines of dehiscence to release the spores inside. The sporangium is hygroscopic as it will dehisce in dry conditions to release spores from the gaps, and will close back up in moist conditions. The spores are red-brown in colour, usually larger than 20 μm in diameter, and lack elaters.

== Habitat and distribution ==
Andreaea rupestris are typically found in cooler climates on surfaces or fissures of dry, siliceous, exposed rock such as granite. While they can also grow in neutral to mildly basic conditions, they are usually found on acidic rocks and cliff walls. They can be found from sea level to high elevations, but are more commonly associated with higher altitudes. Compared to other species in their genus, they can withstand a wider variety of moisture levels and are better at surviving in drier conditions. They have been found to grow with other species of their genus such as Andreaea nivalis, A. blyttii, A. rigida, A. crassinervia, A. rothii ssp. rothii, A. rothii ssp. jalcata, A. alpina, and A. obovata.

They are primarily distributed around the Northern hemisphere in North America, Europe, and Asia. More specifically, they have been confirmed in Canada, the United States, Norway, Britain, Ireland, Kazakhstan, Korea, China, Japan, Central America, New Zealand, Antarctica and more recently in 2018, Greece.

== Life cycle and reproduction ==
The sporophyte and gametophyte represent two generations of A. rupestris, also known as the alternation of heteromorphic generations. The gametophyte stage starts with the haploid spore, which then germinates into a thalloid protonema. The protonema then gives rise to the leafy gametophyte which houses the male and female organs also known as the antheridia and archegonia, respectively.

Andreaea rupestris are autoicous, meaning that their male and female organs exist on separate branches within the same gametophyte. The close proximity of the antheridia and archegonia helps facilitate fertilization. The antheridia contain sperm that travel down the neck of an archegonium, which houses the egg, to fertilize it. When the egg is fertilized and becomes a diploid zygote, it then develops into the diploid sporangium. Note that the sporangium is attached to a haploid pseudopodium that was derived from gametophytic tissue. Through the process of meiosis, haploid spores are produced and released through the gaps of the dehisced sporangium.

== Conservation ==
According to the BC Conservation Data Centre, this species is deemed "demonstrably widespread, abundant and secure" globally. In British Columbia, it is labelled as "at the least risk of being lost".
