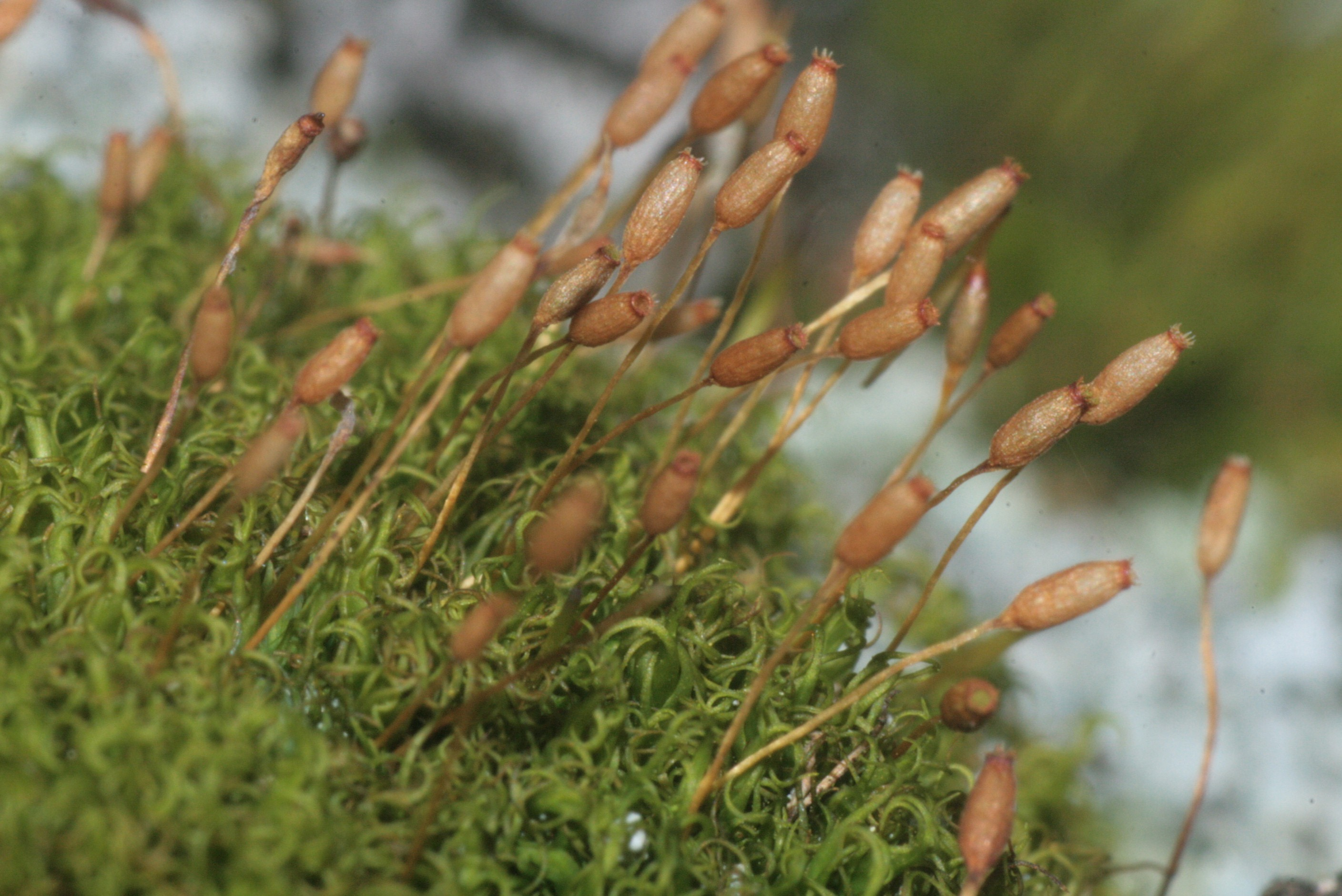

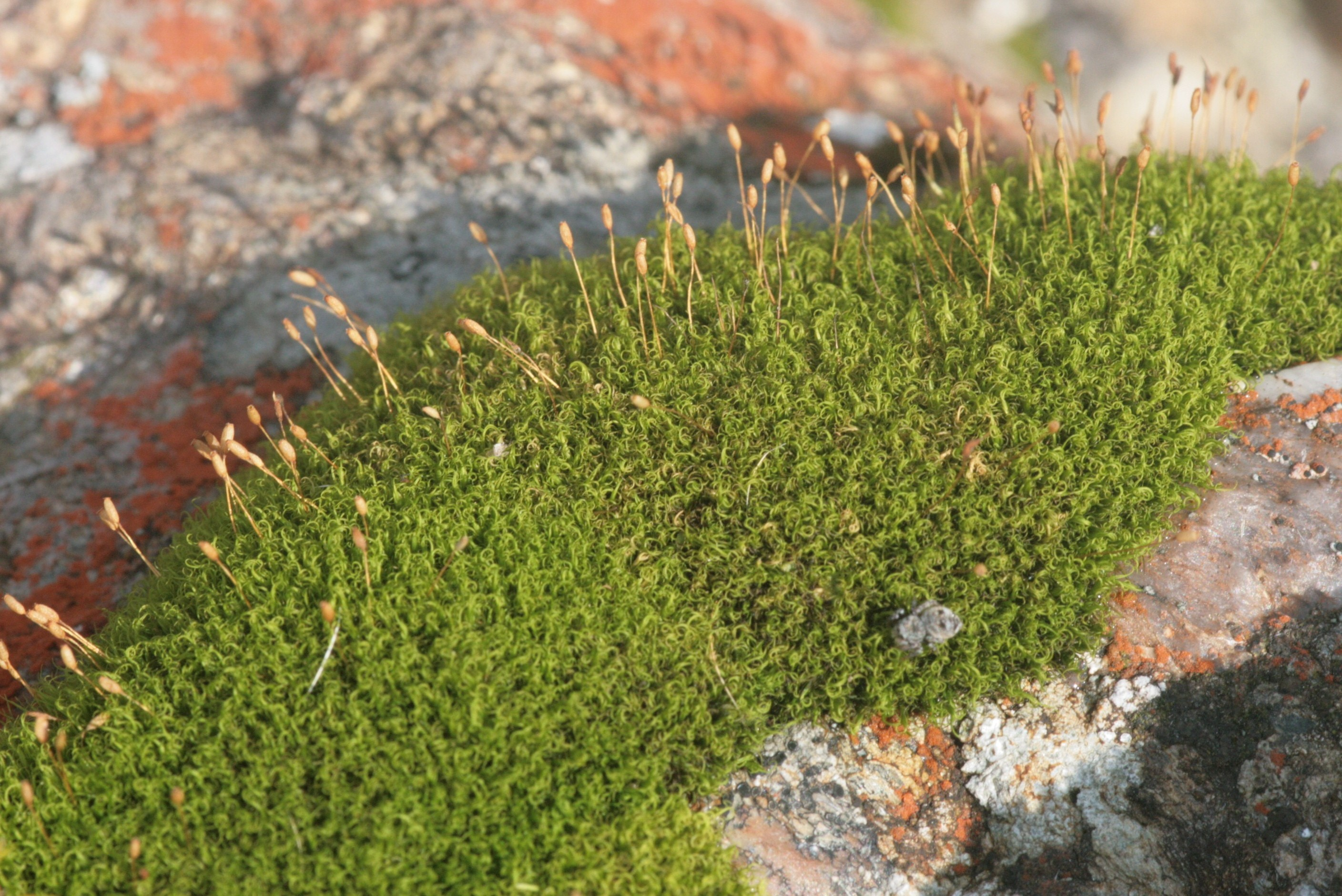
- Dicranoweisia crispula

Conservation status
- Least Concern (IUCN 3.1)

Scientific classification
- Kingdom: Plantae
- Clade: Embryophytes
- Division: Bryophyta
- Class: Bryopsida
- Subclass: Dicranidae
- Order: Rhabdoweisiales
- Family: Rhabdoweisiaceae
- Genus: Dicranoweisia
- Species: D. crispula

Binomial name
- Dicranoweisia crispula (Hedw.) Milde

Synonyms
- Hymenoloma crispulum

= Dicranoweisia crispula =

Species of moss

Dicranoweisia crispula, the mountain pincushion, is a species of mosses that lives at both poles. It grows in the south pole on the South Shetland Islands and on the Antarctic Peninsula, and in the north pole on the Svalbard archipelago
