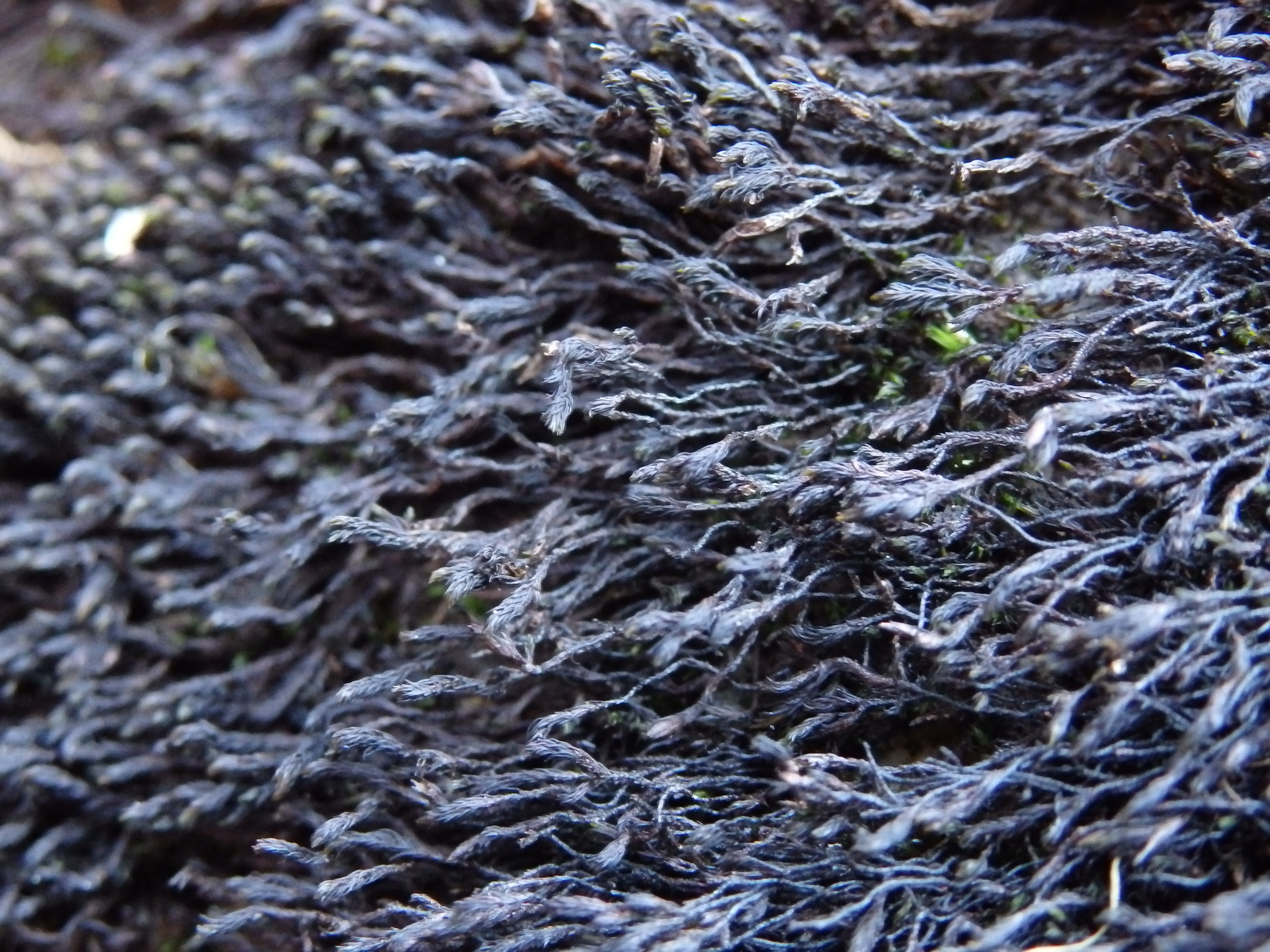

Conservation status
- Vulnerable (IUCN 3.1)

Scientific classification
- Kingdom: Plantae
- Division: Bryophyta
- Subdivision: Andreaeophytina
- Class: Andreaeopsida
- Order: Andreaeales
- Family: Andreaeaceae
- Genus: Andreaea
- Species: A. frigida

Binomial name
- Andreaea frigida Huebener

Synonyms
- Andreaea grimsulana Bruch; Andreaea nivalis var. frigida (Huebener) Rabenh.; Andreaea rothii subsp. frigida (Huebener) W. Schultze-Motel; Andreaea rothii var. frigida (Huebener) Lindb.; Andreaea frigida f. cuspidata (Limpr.) Mönk.; Andreaea frigida var. sudetica Limpr.; Andreaea rothii var. grimsulana (Bruch) Müll.Hal.; Andreaea rupestris var. septentrionalis Schimp.; Andreaea rupestris var. grimsulana (Bruch) Schimp.; Andreaea frigida var. cuspidata Limpr.

= Andreaea frigida =

Icy rockmoss

Species of moss

Andreaea frigida, commonly known as icy rock moss, is a species of moss endemic to Europe.

== Distribution and habitat ==
Endemic to the mountains of Europe between 37 degrees north and 67 degrees north, A. frigida can be found in Andorra, Austria, Belgium, the Czech Republic, France (mainland France and Corsica), Germany, Hungary, Italy, Luxembourg, Monaco, the Netherlands, Norway, Poland, Portugal, Romania, Slovakia, Spain, Switzerland, Ukraine, and the United Kingdom. It grows in humid, rocky areas in alpine or subalpine habitats at altitudes of 385–2,800 m (1,263–9,186 ft) above sea level.

In the UK its occurrence is widespread in the Cairngorms National Park, where it is typically found on rocks in burns fed by snow patches, but it is not found elsewhere except at a single site in the Lake District of England.

The earliest records for the UK date to 1854, (although its existence was not formally recognised until 1988), and it is classified as "Vulnerable". The greatest threat to its continuing existence is assumed to be global warming.

== See also ==
- Endemic Scottish moss species:
  - Bryoerythrophyllum caledonicum
  - Bryum dixonii
  - Pohlia scotica
- Flora of Scotland
