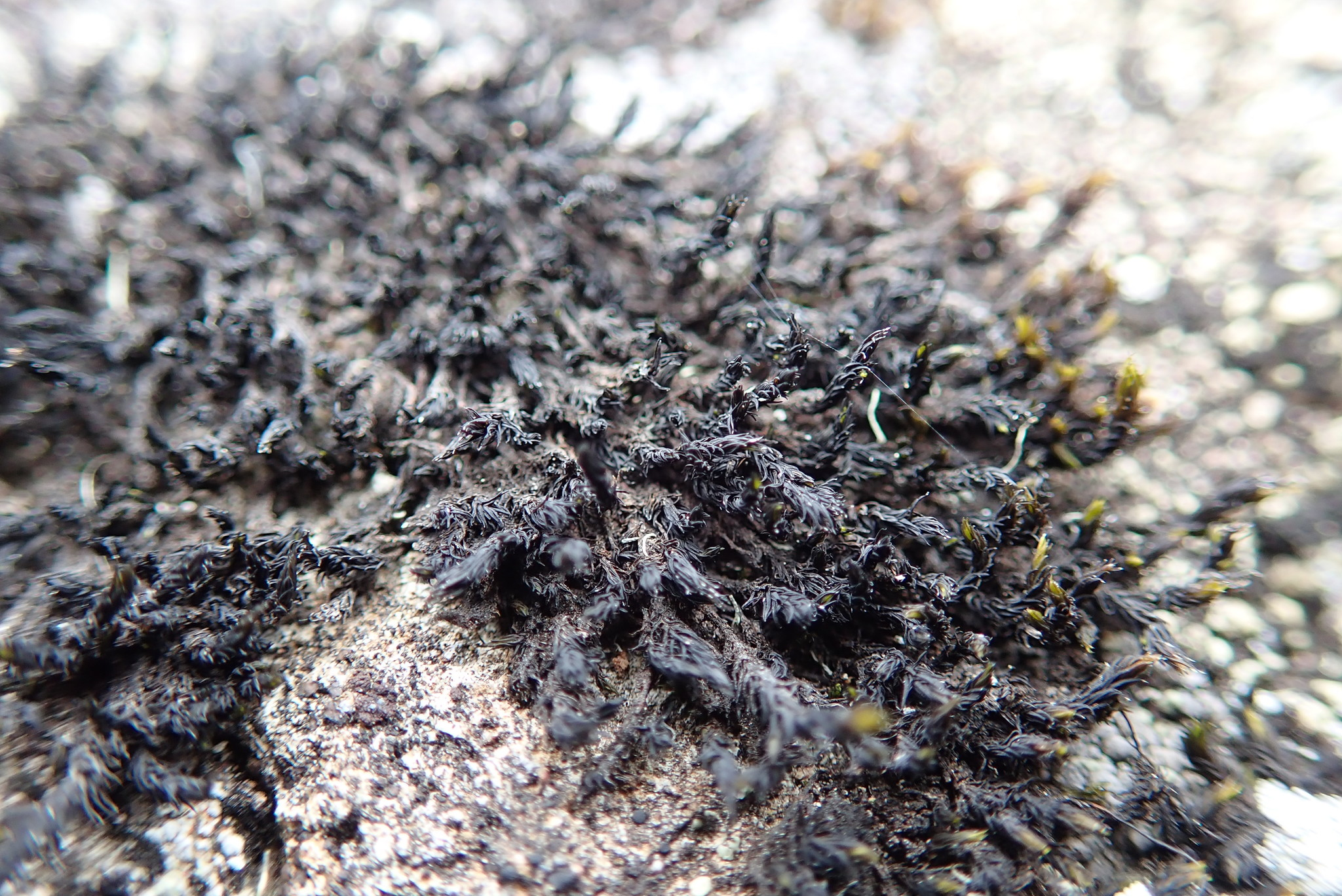
- In British Columbia, Canada

Conservation status
- Secure (NatureServe)

Scientific classification
- Kingdom: Plantae
- Division: Bryophyta
- Subdivision: Andreaeophytina
- Class: Andreaeopsida
- Order: Andreaeales
- Family: Andreaeaceae
- Genus: Andreaea
- Species: A. rothii

Binomial name
- Andreaea rothii F.Weber & D.Mohr

Synonyms
- Andreaea rupestris Roth; Andreaea rothii var. hamata Lindb.; Andreaea rothii f. hamata (Lindb.) Mönk.; Andreaea rupestris var. hamata (Lindb.) Paris; Andreaea rothii var. rothii

= Andreaea rothii =

Species of moss

Andreaea rothii, or Roth's andreaea moss, is a species of moss in the family Andreaeaceae native to North America and parts of Europe. This plant was described in 1807 by Weber and Mohr.

== Description ==
Andreaea rothii gametophytes sometimes form extensive black to brown cushion-like patches, with individual shoots erect and less than 2 cm tall. The leaves of Andreaea rothii are 1-2 cm wide, and have a strong costa, which is roughly synonymous to a midrib. The leaves can be falcate-secund, curving to one side of the plant. This is especially true when wet, however the plants do not alter much when dry. The outline of the leaf is pear-shaped, swelling at the base and tapering to a tip, and can also be strongly curved depending on subspecies.

== Distribution ==
Andreaea rothii grows on rocks that are wet, acidic, and exposed. This species is found anywhere from areas of high elevation to sea-level.

== Reproduction ==
Andreae rothii gametophytes can be gonioautoicous—meaning the antheridia are bud-like in the axil of an archegonial branch—or cladautoicous—meaning the antheridia and archegonia are found on different branches of the same plant. Like all of the Andreaeaceae, sporangia are elevated on a pseudopodium, a structure resembling a seta but composed of gametophyte tissue rather than sporophyte tissue. The sporangia will dehisce longitudinally, forming slits through which spores are dispersed. This pattern of dehiscence gives the genus its common name: "Lantern mosses".
