= Dicranoweisia brevipes =

Scientific classification
- Kingdom: Plantae
- Division: Bryophyta
- Class: Bryopsida
- Subclass: Dicranidae
- Order: Rhabdoweisiales
- Family: Rhabdoweisiaceae
- Genus: Dicranoweisia
- Species: D. brevipes

Binomial name
- Dicranoweisia brevipes (C.Muell.) Card.

Species of moss

Dicranoweisia brevipes is a species of moss that occurs on the Antarctic Peninsula and regional islands.
