= Hypnodontopsis apiculata =

Conservation status
- Vulnerable (IUCN 2.3)

Scientific classification
- Kingdom: Plantae
- Division: Bryophyta
- Class: Bryopsida
- Subclass: Dicranidae
- Order: Rhabdoweisiales
- Family: Rhachitheciaceae
- Genus: Hypnodontopsis
- Species: H. apiculata

Binomial name
- Hypnodontopsis apiculata Z. Iwats. & Nog.

Species of moss

Hypnodontopsis apiculata is a species of moss in the Rhachitheciaceae family. It is endemic to Japan. Its natural habitat is urban areas. It is threatened by habitat loss.
