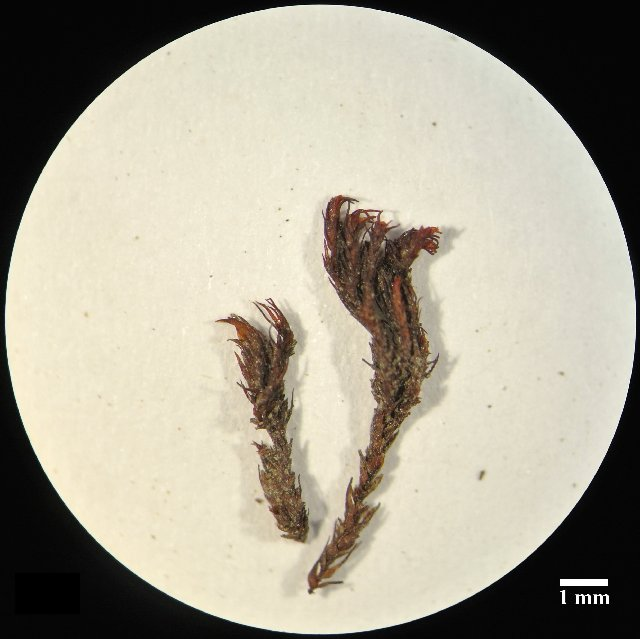

Conservation status
- Near Threatened (IUCN 3.1) (Europe regional assessment)

- Secure (NatureServe)

Scientific classification
- Kingdom: Plantae
- Clade: Embryophytes
- Division: Bryophyta
- Class: Andreaeopsida
- Order: Andreaeales
- Family: Andreaeaceae
- Genus: Andreaea
- Species: A. blyttii

Binomial name
- Andreaea blyttii Schimp.

Synonyms
- Andreaea perichaetialis J.E. Zetterst. & Björnstr.

= Andreaea blyttii =

Species of moss

Andreaea blyttii, also commonly known as Blytt's rock moss, is a moss belonging to the family Andreaeaceae, commonly known as rock moss, granite moss, or lantern moss because of this family's unique sporangium. It is part of the genus Andreaea which is known for forming dark brownish or reddish-black carpets in high elevations. This species was first described by Wilhelm Philippe Schimper in 1855.

== Description ==
The shoots of A. blyttii vary in length. They are distinctively known for being small and dark red or black. They form tuffs and have acrocarpus growth. Depending on the frequency of desiccation, the branching pattern can vary from unbranched to irregularly branched. The number of leaves per shoot increases in dry environments. The stem walls are made up of pigmented cells and the stem lacks a conducting strand which is a character of the genus Andreaea. Rhizoids are attached at the base of the shoot. The spores are uniquely small in this species and grow into a thalloid protonema. The leaves of this species are known to vary in morphology. Leaf length and curvature, costa width and cell length are reduced in response to desiccation. Leaf curvature can be erect, falcate-secund, or curved. Larger more curved leaves with a smaller subula have been noted as a deviant morphology. Most leaves are erect and have a short and wide basal lamina with rectangular unistratose cells and a long subula also known as a limb with a costa spanning the entire length of the leaf. The costa is multistratose. This moss is closely related to Andreaea nivalis but A. blyttii lacks the denticulate leaf margins and very papillose upper cells of A. nivalis.

== Habitat ==
Andreaea blyttii is usually found on rocks such as gneiss and granite. It also found in late to extremely late snow beds at low to high latitudes and elevations. It forms dense mats in mountain alpines where few other mosses can survive and is able to colonize sites of deglaciation. In Norway, it has commonly been observed growing in association with Hymenoloma crispulum and Schistidium pulchrum. A. blyttii grows better on non-calcareous rocks.

== Distribution ==
Andreaea blyttii is distributed across higher elevations in Greenland, Iceland, Northern Europe, Northern Asia and across North America in California, Oregon, Washington, British Columbia, Alaska, Yukon, North West territories, Nunavut, Newfoundland and Labrador, and Quebec.

== Reproduction ==
Andreaea blyttii can reproduce asexually and sexually. Asexual reproduction is through vegetative fragments. After touching A. blyttii, your hands can collect some of the fragments. The frequency of vegetative reproduction is recorded to be higher in moist environments but A. blyttii survive better in dry environments. Fragments need to be able to anchor to their substrate which is usually rock before getting washed away. Sexual reproduction occurs through sporic meiosis like in all bryophytes. A. blyttii is autoicous meaning its female and male reproductive structures are on separate branches but on the same shoot. The archegonium is borne at the tip of the shoot and is wrapped in perichaetial leaves which are differentiated from the rest of the leaves on the shoot. The sporophyte emerges from the archegonium. All members of Andreaeopsida lack a seta and instead have a gametophyte pseudopodium that attaches to the sporangium. The capsules of the sporangium lack peristome teeth and have 4 lines of moisture sensitive openings called lines of dehiscence. To release spores the capsule opens via the lines of dehiscence when dry giving the sporophyte a paper lantern appearance. These capsule openings allows for the spores to be released gradually. The spores of this species are characteristically small ranging from 13-15 μm.
