= Kiaeria =

Kiaeria may refer to:

- Kiaeria (plant), a genus of plants of the family Dicranaceae
- Kiaeria (arthropod), an extinct monotypic genus of chasmataspidid

== See also ==
- Kiaeritia, a genus of ostracod formerly known as Kiaeria
