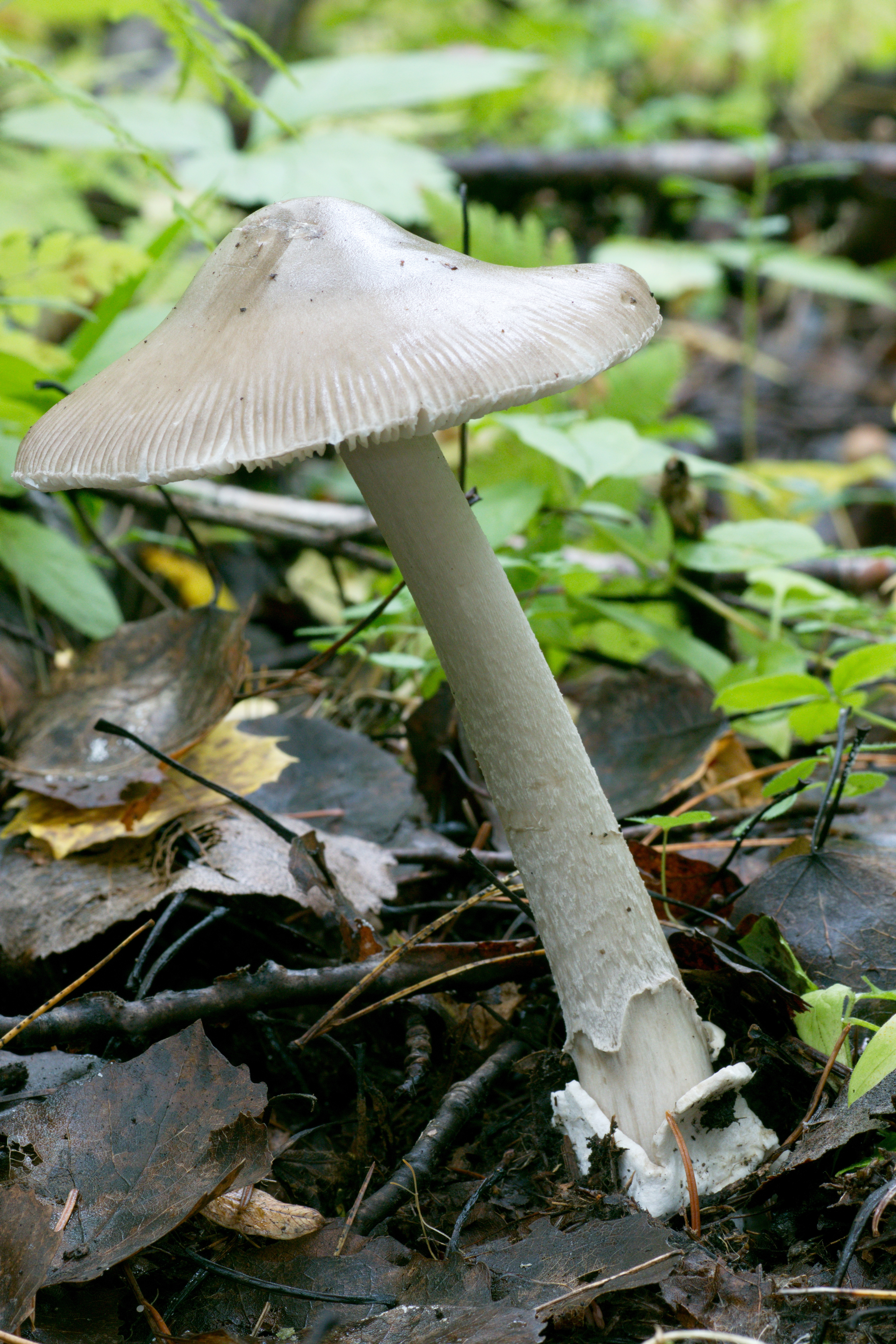

Scientific classification
- Kingdom: Fungi
- Division: Basidiomycota
- Class: Agaricomycetes
- Order: Agaricales
- Family: Amanitaceae
- Genus: Amanita
- Species: A. islandica

Binomial name
- Amanita islandica Melot (1992)

= Amanita islandica =

Species of fungus

Amanita islandica
- Mycological characteristics
- Gills on hymenium
- Cap is conical or umbonate
- Hymenium is free
- Stipe has a volva
- Spore print is white
- Ecology is mycorrhizal
- Edibility is unknown

Amanita islandica is a species of basidiomycete fungus in the family Amanitaceae, first described in 1992 from specimens collected in Iceland. The delicate, predominantly white mushroom made by the fungus is characterised by its conical to convex cap measuring 6–8 centimetres across, exceptionally tall and slender stipe up to 20 centimetres in height, and distinctive sack-like cup at the base, while lacking the ring around the stem that many other Amanita species have. Native to subarctic and northern European regions, it forms ecological partnerships with birch trees in Iceland and has also been found in Swedish forests growing among birch and spruce, typically in wet, mossy areas.

== Taxonomy ==
Amanita islandica is a ringless Amanita (grisette) described in 1992 by the French mycologist Jean-Louis Melot. Its specific epithet islandica refers to Iceland, where the type specimens were collected. Melot's original publication in Documents Mycologiques established this fungus as a distinct species from other grisettes. A. islandica is classified in Amanita subgenus Amanitopsis (also known as section Vaginatae), the group of Amanitas lacking a partial veil (ring). Within the grisettes it is closely related to species like Amanita nivalis and Amanita vaginata, but differs in morphology and genetics.

== Description ==
This fungus produces delicate white basidiocarps (fruiting bodies). The cap is 6–8 cm in diameter, at first narrowly conical then expanding to convex-conical. It is whitish in colour – pure white to faintly yellowish or greyish in the centre with age. The cap surface is smooth and moist (slightly sticky when wet), with a striate margin (grooved edges) but without any warty patches or universal veil remnants. Gills are free, crowded, and white. The stipe is exceptionally long and slender – up to 15–20 cm tall but only 1.4–2 cm thicksvampar.se. The stem is fragile, hollow in part, and tapers upward. It is entirely white and densely covered with white fibrillose scales or floccose (wooly) fragments, especially in its lower portion. At the base of the stipe sits a large, thick, white volva that forms a free, sack-like cup with lobed edges. There is no ring on the stipe, a key feature of this ringless Amanita. The spore print is white; spores are roughly spherical, roughly 9–11 μm in sizes, and lack an amyloid staining reaction. Clamp connections are absent in the hyphae.

== Habitat and distribution ==
Amanita islandica is an ectomycorrhizal mushroom of subarctic and boreal ecosystems. As its name suggests, it was originally found in Iceland, where it associates with native birch (Betula pubescens) woodlands. It likely forms mycorrhiza with birch – Melot noted it as symbiont with birch in Iceland. The species has since been recorded in other parts of northern Europe. In Sweden, it was collected in Västergötland under birch and spruce. A. islandica favours wet, mossy mixed forests of birch and Norway spruce in cool climates. It often fruits in late summer to autumn, sometimes in unusual places (one Swedish collection grew from an ant hill in a birch-spruce forest). This species is considered rare. In Iceland it is one of the few native Amanitas and is infrequently encountered. In Scandinavia it is also uncommon, meriting inclusion on regional fungal redlists. Its delicate white caps can be overlooked among moss and lichens, contributing to its apparent rarity.

== See also ==
- List of Amanita species
