= Andreaea willii =

Scientific classification
- Kingdom: Plantae
- Division: Bryophyta
- Subdivision: Andreaeophytina
- Class: Andreaeopsida
- Order: Andreaeales
- Family: Andreaeaceae
- Genus: Andreaea
- Species: A. willii

Binomial name
- Andreaea willii Müller

Species of moss

Andreaea willii is a species of moss in the family Andreaeaceae that was described by Carl Von Müller in 1890. A. wilii was first collected during the German International Polar-Year Expedition of 1882-1883. It has been found on South Georgia.
