= Hypnodontopsis =

Scientific classification
- Kingdom: Plantae
- Division: Bryophyta
- Class: Bryopsida
- Subclass: Dicranidae
- Order: Rhabdoweisiales
- Family: Rhachitheciaceae
- Genus: Hypnodontopsis; Z.Iwats. & Nog.

Genus of haplolepideous mosses

Hypnodontopsis is a genus of haplolepideous mosses (Dicranidae) in family Rhachitheciaceae.

It contains the following species according to World Flora Online:

- Hypnodontopsis apiculata Z.Iwats. & Nog.
- Hypnodontopsis mexicana (Thér.) H.Rob.
- Hypnodontopsis spathulata H.Akiyama & At.Tanaka
