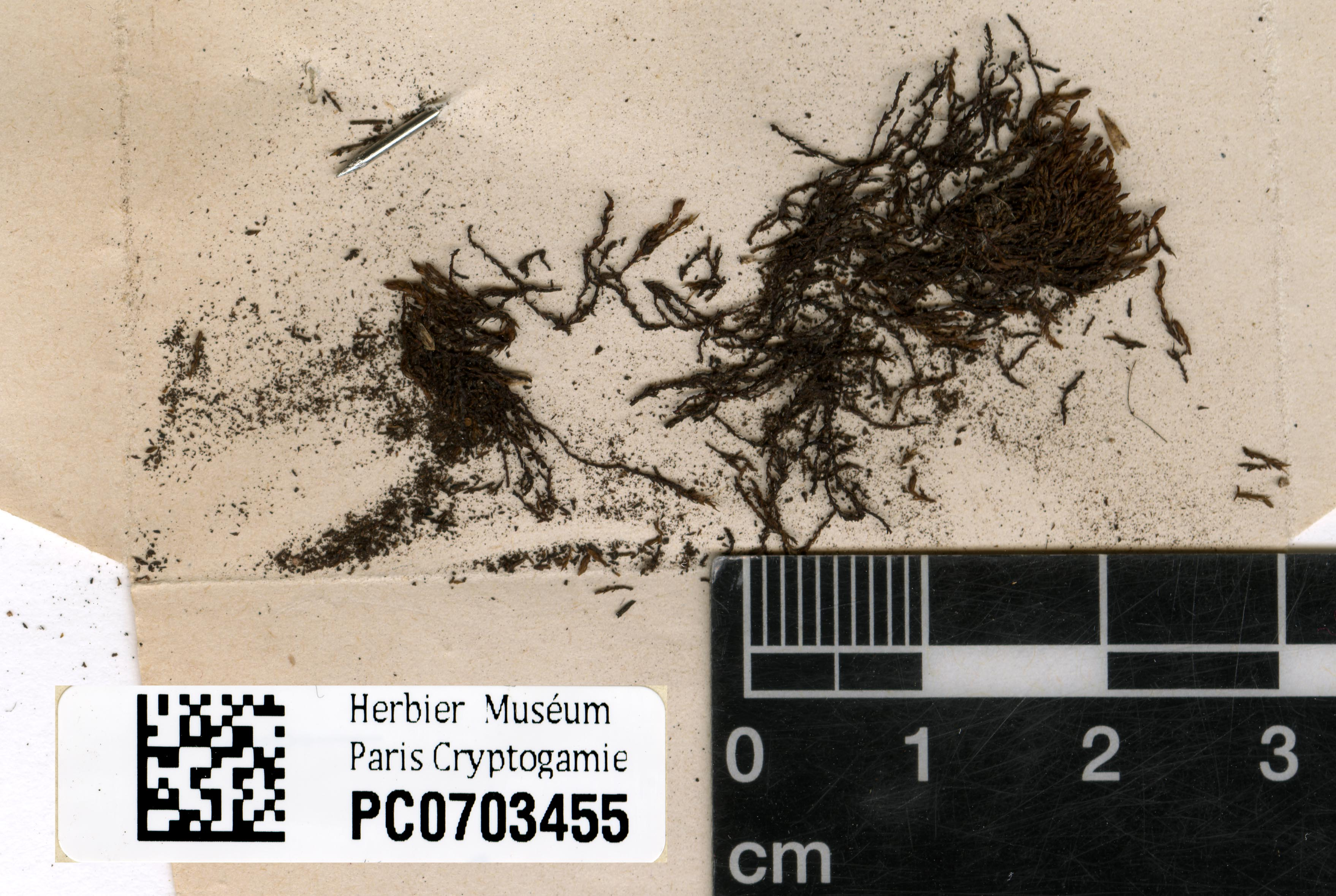
- Close-up of the isolectotype of Andraea depressinervis

Scientific classification
- Kingdom: Plantae
- Division: Bryophyta
- Subdivision: Andreaeophytina
- Class: Andreaeopsida
- Order: Andreaeales
- Family: Andreaeaceae
- Genus: Andreaea
- Species: A. depressinervis

Binomial name
- Andreaea depressinervis Cardot

= Andreaea depressinervis =

Species of moss

Andreaea depressinervis is a species of moss in the family Andreaeaceae that was discovered by Jules Cardot in 1901. It is found on both the South Shetland Islands and the Antarctica.

Andreaea depressinervis has costate leaves, which means they have parallel veins throughout the leaves.
