= Mönkemeyer =

Mönkemeyer is a surname. Notable people with the surname include:

- Nils Mönkemeyer (born 1978), German violist and teacher
- Uwe Mönkemeyer (born 1959), German Olympic runner
- Wilhelm Mönkemeyer (1862–1938), German bryologist
