= Andreaea lorentziana =

Scientific classification
- Kingdom: Plantae
- Division: Bryophyta
- Subdivision: Andreaeophytina
- Class: Andreaeopsida
- Order: Andreaeales
- Family: Andreaeaceae
- Genus: Andreaea
- Species: A. lorentziana

Binomial name
- Andreaea lorentziana Müller

Species of moss

Andreaea lorentziana is a species of moss in the family Andreaeaceae that was first described by Carl Von Müller in 1879. A. lorentziana grows in Antarctica and Patagonia.
