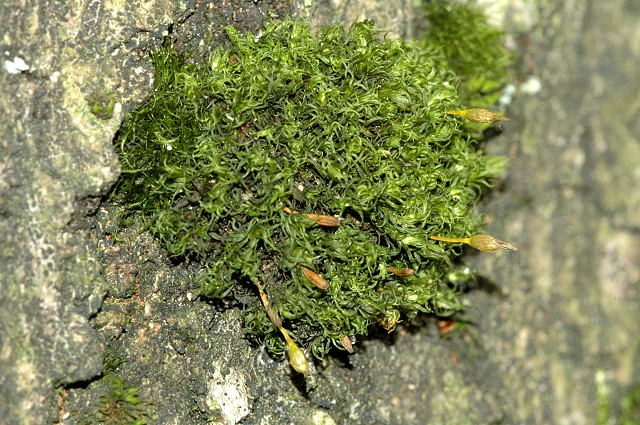
- Dicranoweisia cirrata

Scientific classification
- Kingdom: Plantae
- Clade: Embryophytes
- Division: Bryophyta
- Class: Bryopsida
- Subclass: Dicranidae
- Order: Rhabdoweisiales
- Family: Rhabdoweisiaceae
- Genus: Dicranoweisia; Lindb. ex Milde

= Dicranoweisia =

Genus of mosses

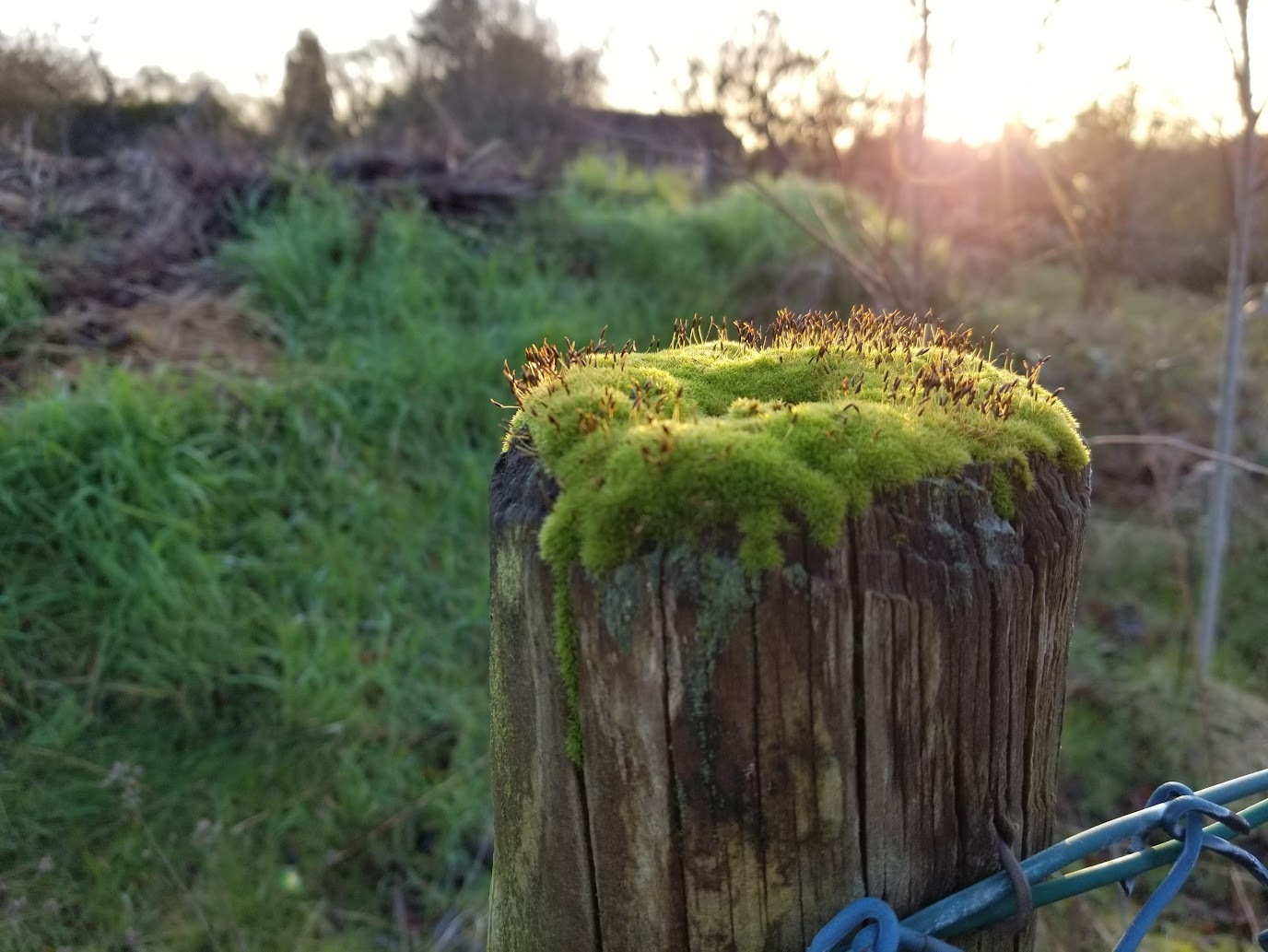
Dicranoweisia cirrata on a fence post in Lüneburg, Germany.

Dicranoweisia is a genus of mosses belonging to the family Rhabdoweisiaceae.

The genus has cosmopolitan distribution.

There are 5 accepted species, including:

- Dicranoweisia africana Dixon
- Dicranoweisia cirrata (Hedw.) Lindb. ex Milde
- Dicranoweisia crispula (Hedw.) Milde
- Dicranoweisia microcarpa (Hook.f. & Wilson) Paris
- Dicranoweisia tortelloides (Müll.Hal.) Paris
