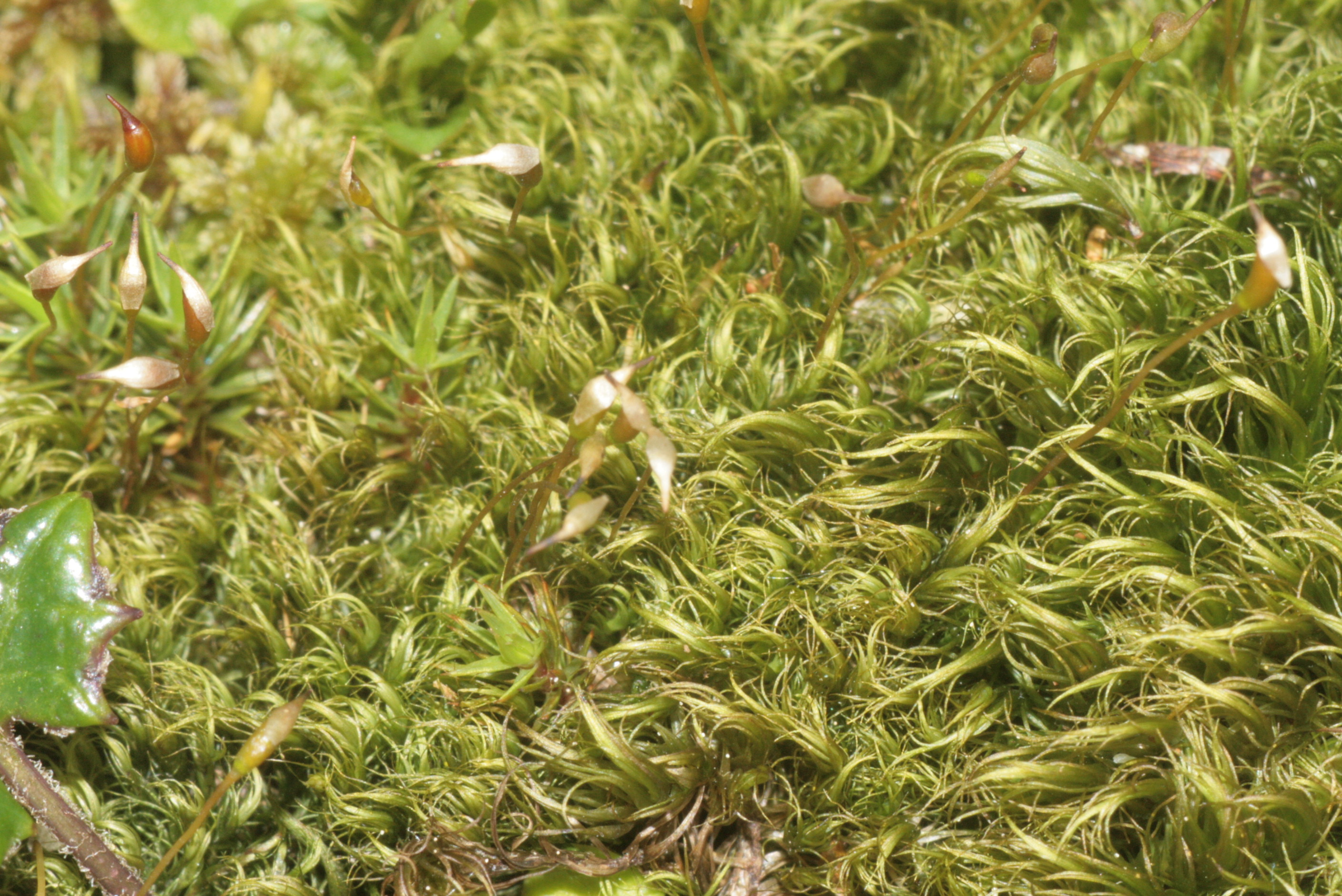
- Kiaeria starkei

Scientific classification
- Kingdom: Plantae
- Clade: Embryophytes
- Division: Bryophyta
- Class: Bryopsida
- Subclass: Dicranidae
- Order: Rhabdoweisiales
- Family: Rhabdoweisiaceae
- Genus: Kiaeria; I.Hagen

Synonyms
- Dicranum sect. Falcata Bruch & Schimp.; Pseudoblindia Fedosov, M. Stech & Ignatov

= Kiaeria (plant) =

Genus of haplolepideous mosses

Kiaeria is a genus of haplolepideous mosses (Dicranidae) of the family Dicranaceae. The genus is named after Franz Caspar Kiaer (1835-1893), a Norwegian doctor and bryologist.

== Description ==
The moss is similar to small Dicranum species and form loose to dense cushions. The stems are erect, 1-2 inches high (occasionally higher) and are sparsely fibrous with rhizoids below. The leaves are lanceolate, erect-spreading, sometimes falcate, with full margins, to cut up against the blade tip, with emerging veining. The leaf cells are elongated at the leaf base and smooth, the top sheet portion extends to approximately square and smooth. The leaf wing cells are clearly differentiated.

The spore capsule, at the end of the 7-16 millimeter-long seta is strumose and more or less inclined. The capsule lid is beaked. The peristome teeth are divided in about the middle.

== Distribution ==
Species of the genus Kiaeria are found in the northern hemisphere in the arctic and subalpine to alpine areas. They grow on silicate rocks and on the ground.

== Species ==
The following species are recognised in the genus Kiaeria:

- Kiaeria falcata (Hedw.) I. Hagen - sickle kiaeria moss
- Kiaeria inundata (Cardot) Brinda, Ignatov & Fedosov
- Kiaeria lewinskyae (J.K. Bartlett & Vitt) Brinda, Ignatov & Fedosov
- Kiaeria robusta (Hampe) Brinda, Ignatov & Fedosov
