= Andreaea gainii =

Scientific classification
- Kingdom: Plantae
- Division: Bryophyta
- Subdivision: Andreaeophytina
- Class: Andreaeopsida
- Order: Andreaeales
- Family: Andreaeaceae
- Genus: Andreaea
- Species: A. gainii

Binomial name
- Andreaea gainii Cardot

Species of moss

Andreaea gainii is a species of moss native to western Antarctica and the South Shetland Islands. It grows on exposed rocks and soil.
