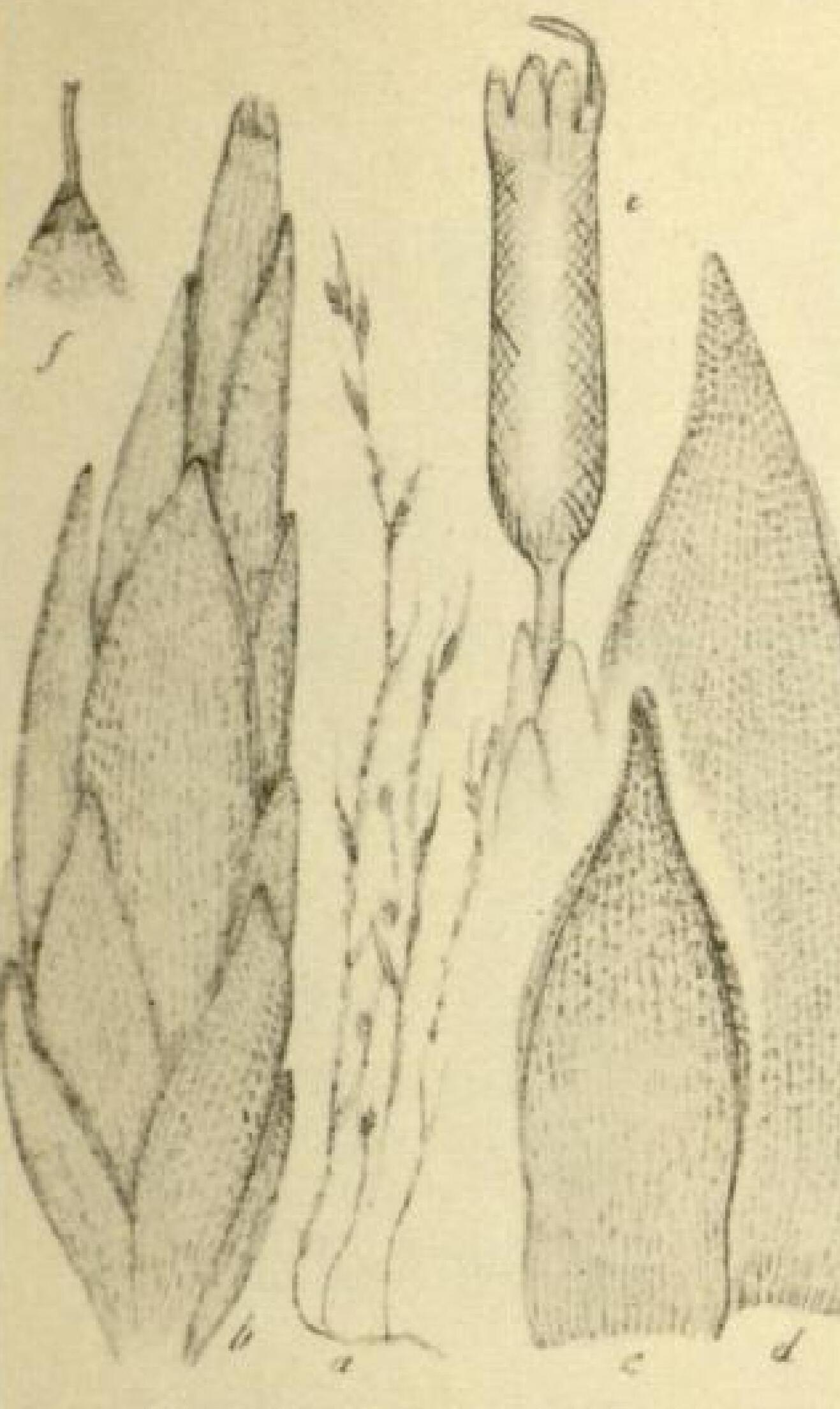
- 1911 illustration of A. wilsonii

Scientific classification
- Kingdom: Plantae
- Division: Bryophyta
- Class: Andreaeopsida
- Order: Andreaeales
- Family: Andreaeaceae
- Genus: Acroschisma (Hook.f. & Wilson) Lindl.

= Acroschisma =

Genus of mosses

Acroschisma is a genus of mosses belonging to the family Andreaeaceae.

The species of this genus are found in Southern America.

Species:

- Acroschisma andensis Spruce
