= Andreaea regularis =

Scientific classification
- Kingdom: Plantae
- Division: Bryophyta
- Subdivision: Andreaeophytina
- Class: Andreaeopsida
- Order: Andreaeales
- Family: Andreaeaceae
- Genus: Andreaea
- Species: A. regularis

Binomial name
- Andreaea regularis Müll.Hal.

Species of moss

Andreaea regularis is a species of moss that grows in Antarctica and on the South Shetland Islands.
