= Robert Brown (New Zealand botanist) =

New Zealand bootmaker and botanist (1824–1906)

- Died: 13 December 1906
- Scientific career
- Fields: Botany

Robert Brown (c. 1824 – 13 December 1906) was a New Zealand bootmaker and botanist. He was born in Glasgow, Scotland, probably between 1821 and 1824.
