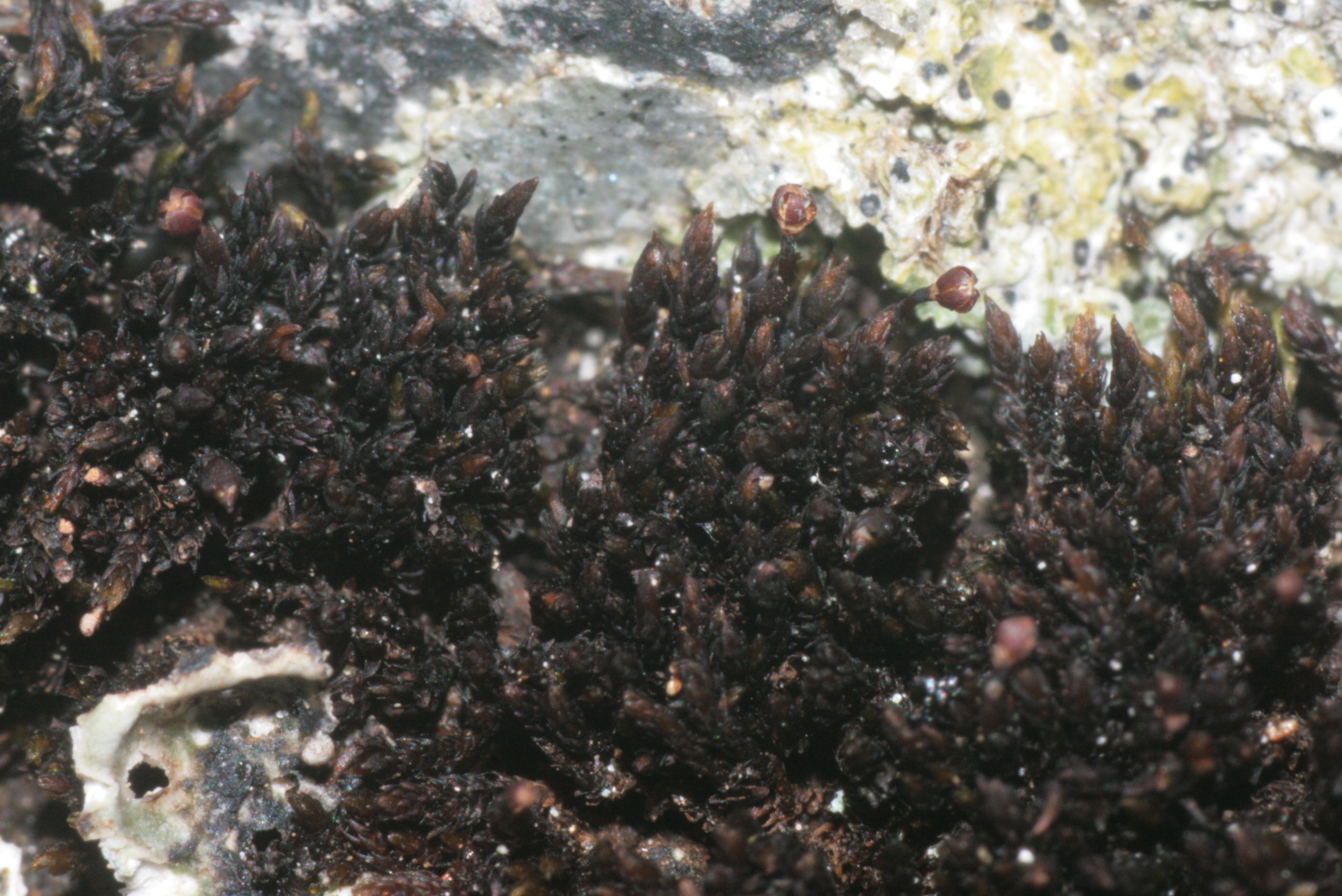
- Andreaea rupestris

Scientific classification
- Kingdom: Plantae
- Division: Bryophyta
- Class: Andreaeopsida
- Order: Andreaeales
- Family: Andreaeaceae; Dumort.
- Genus: Andreaea; Hedw.

= Andreaea =

Genus of mosses

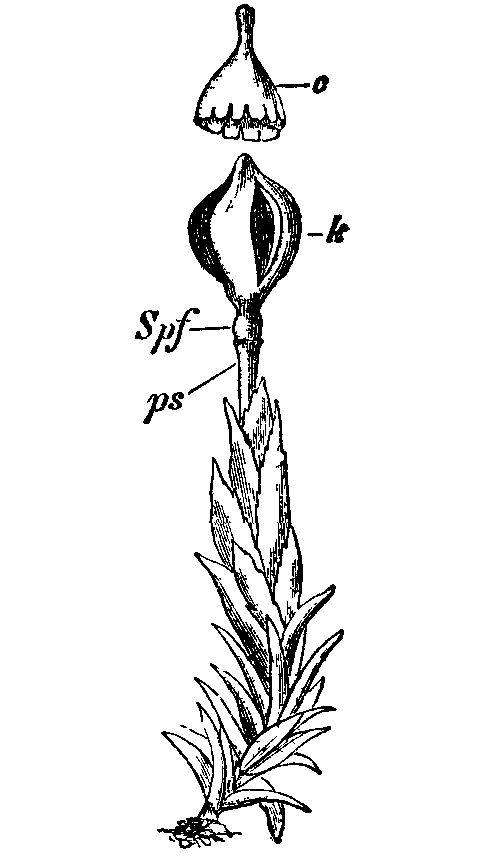
Morphology of Andreaea rupestris

Andreaea is a genus of rock mosses described by Johann Hedwig in 1801.

They are small, delicate acrocarpous mosses (meaning that the capsules are formed at the tips of vertical branches) that form dark brown or reddish cushions on wet siliceous rocks in mountainous areas. The capsule lacks the peristome teeth and operculum of other mosses, and opens by splitting along 4 vertical slits, the four valves remaining joined at the base and apex. The capsule of Andreaea has no seta, but the sporophyte (Spf in the diagram below) instead is supported by a pseudopodium (ps) derived from gametophyte tissue, as in Sphagnum and the columella is enclosed within the sporangium. The spores germinate to give thalloid protonemata.

== Species ==
In alphabetical order:

- Andreaea acuminata - Tasmania
- Andreaea acutifolia - Tasmania, New Zealand, Hawaii, Colombia, Chile, Bolivia
- Andreaea alpina - Greenland, Lesotho, South Africa, Chile, Norway, Scotland
- Andreaea amblyophylla - Australia
- Andreaea angustata - Switzerland, Austria, Bavaria
- Andreaea angustifolia - Bolivia
- Andreaea apiculata - New Zealand
- Andreaea appendiculata
- Andreaea arachnoidea - Bolivia
- Andreaea aterrima - Bismarck Is
- Andreaea atlantica - Tristan da Cunha
- Andreaea australis - Australia, New Zealand
- Andreaea barbuloides - Bolivia
- Andreaea bistratosa - South Africa
- Andreaea blyttii - northern Europe, Siberia, Canada, Greenland, United States (AK WA OR CA)
- Andreaea borbonica - Réunion
- Andreaea brevifolia - Patagonia
- Andreaea brevipes - Colombia, Peru, Ecuador, Bolivia
- Andreaea camerunensis - Cameroon
- Andreaea clavata - Bolivia, Peru
- Andreaea cockaynei - New Zealand
- Andreaea cucullata - Kenya, Tanzania
- Andreaea densifolia - China
- Andreaea depressinervis - Antarctica
- Andreaea dissitifolia - Bolivia
- Andreaea erythrodictyon - Bolivia
- Andreaea eximia - Tasmania
- Andreaea filiformis - Chukchi Peninsula
- Andreaea firma - central Africa
- Andreaea flabellata - Tasmania
- Andreaea flexuosa - New Zealand
- Andreaea fragilis - Antarctica, Patagonia
- Andreaea frigida - Europe
- Andreaea fuegiana - Tierra del Fuego, Poland
- Andreaea gainii - Antarctica
- Andreaea gibbosa - New Zealand
- Andreaea grimmioides - Tierra del Fuego
- Andreaea grimsulana - New Zealand
- Andreaea hamulata - Brazil
- Andreaea hartmanii - Alaska, Siberia, Scandinavia
- Andreaea heinemannii - United States (AK, OR, CA, CO), Canada (BC YT), Europe, Asia, Canary, Kerguelen, Madeira
- Andreaea huttonii - New Zealand
- Andreaea indica - India
- Andreaea javanica - Java
- Andreaea karsteniana - high Andes
- Andreaea kilimandscharica - Kenya, Tanzania, Zimbabwe, Uganda
- Andreaea kinabaluensis - Sabah
- Andreaea laticuspis - Bolivia
- Andreaea latinervis - Tierra del Fuego
- Andreaea laxifolia - Hermite Is, Falkland Is, Campbell I, Auckland Is
- Andreaea leiophylla - Tierra del Fuego
- Andreaea lorentziana - Antarctica, Patagonia
- Andreaea marginata - Hermite Is, Kerguelen
- Andreaea megistospora - AK, BC, WA, UK, Ireland, Norway
- Andreaea microphylla - Minas Gerais
- Andreaea microvaginata - Australia
- Andreaea mildbraedii - central Africa
- Andreaea mitchellii - New Zealand
- Andreaea morrisonensis - China
- Andreaea mutabilis - Falkland Is, Campbell I, Auckland Is, Argentina, BC
- Andreaea nana - Bismarck Is
- Andreaea naumannii - Bismarck Is
- Andreaea nitida - Auckland Is
- Andreaea nivalis - Greenland, Canada (NL, YT, BC), United States (AK, WA, OR, CA), Europe, Russia, Japan
- Andreaea novae-zealandiae - New Zealand
- Andreaea novoguinensis - Papua New Guinea
- Andreaea obovata - Canada, Greenland, Alaska, Central Africa
- Andreaea obtusissima - New Zealand
- Andreaea opaca - Europe
- Andreaea pachyphylla - Tierra del Fuego
- Andreaea parallela - Bismarck Is
- Andreaea patagonica - Antarctica, Tierra del Fuego
- Andreaea peruviana - Peru
- Andreaea pilifera - Antarctica, Tierra del Fuego
- Andreaea planinervia - Europe
- Andreaea pseudomutabilis - Antarctica, Tierra del Fuego
- Andreaea purpurascens - Europe
- Andreaea regularis - Antarctica, South Georgia, Bolivia
- Andreaea remotifolia - Antarctica
- Andreaea rigida - India
- Andreaea robusta - Bolivia
- Andreaea rothii - Europe, North America
- Andreaea rupestris - Europe, Greenland, Alaska, Canada (Nun, Que)
- Andreaea schofieldiana - CA, BC
- Andreaea semisquarrosa - Antarctica, Tierra del Fuego
- Andreaea seriata - Europe
- Andreaea sinuosa - Europe BC Alaska
- Andreaea sparsifolia - Scandinavia
- Andreaea spurioalpina - Rio de Janeiro
- Andreaea squamata - Bismarck Is
- Andreaea squarrifolia - Tristan da Cunha
- Andreaea squarrosa - Bolivia
- Andreaea squarrosofiliformis - Minas Gerais
- Andreaea striata - Bolivia, Brazil
- Andreaea subappendiculata - Bismarck Is
- Andreaea subremotifolia - Antarctica
- Andreaea subulata - Hermite Is, Falkland Is
- Andreaea taiwanensis - Taiwan
- Andreaea tsaratananae - Madagascar, Réunion
- Andreaea tunariensis - Bolivia
- Andreaea turgescens - Costa Rica
- Andreaea urophylla - Ecuador
- Andreaea vaginalis - Antarctica
- Andreaea vilocensis - Bolivia
- Andreaea viridis - Antarctica
- Andreaea vulcanica
- Andreaea wangiana - Yunnan, Sichuan, Tibet
- Andreaea willii - South Georgia
- Andreaea wilsonii - Campbell Is, Auckland Is
