= Rhachitheciaceae =

Scientific classification
- Kingdom: Plantae
- Division: Bryophyta
- Class: Bryopsida
- Subclass: Dicranidae
- Order: Rhabdoweisiales
- Family: Rhachitheciaceae; H. Rob.

Genera
- Seven genera, see text

Family of haplolepideous mosses

Rhachitheciaceae is a family of haplolepideous mosses in the subfamily Dicranidae. It was formerly placed in the order Dicranales, but is now placed in order Rhabdoweisiales along with family Rhabdoweisiaceae.

== Genera ==
The family Rhachitheciaceae contains seven genera:

- Hypnodontopsis Z. Iwats. & Nog.
- Jonesiobryum Bizot & Pócs
- Rhachitheciopsis P. de la Varde
- Rhachithecium Broth. ex Le Jolis
- Tisserantiella P. de la Varde
- Ulea Müll.
- Zanderia Goffinet
