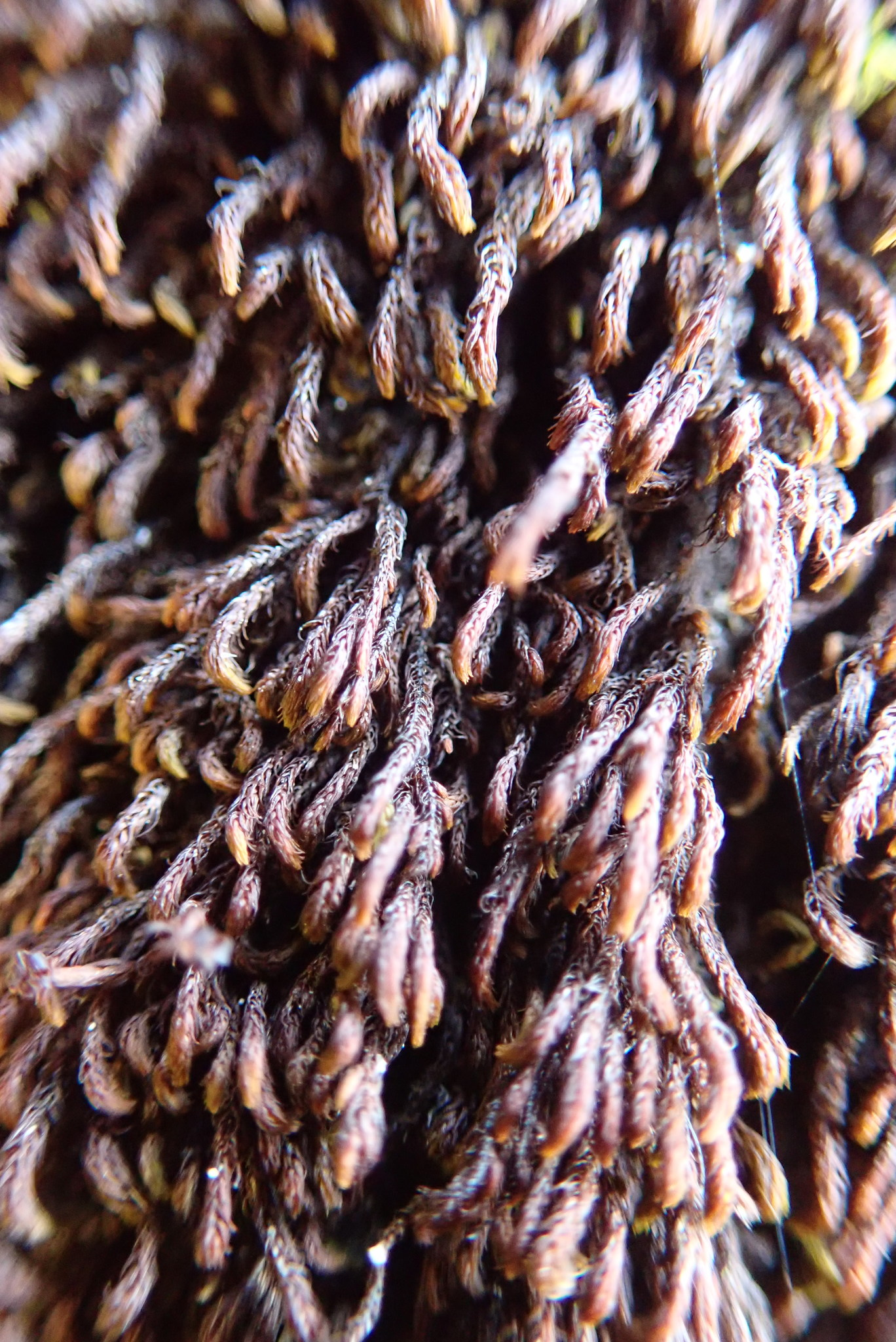

Conservation status
- Near Threatened (IUCN 3.1) (Europe regional assessment)

- Secure (NatureServe)

Scientific classification
- Kingdom: Plantae
- Division: Bryophyta
- Class: Andreaeopsida
- Order: Andreaeales
- Family: Andreaeaceae
- Genus: Andreaea
- Species: A. nivalis

Binomial name
- Andreaea nivalis Hook.

Synonyms
- List: Andreaea nivalis var. fuscescens Hook.; Andreaea nivalis var. zetterstedtii C. Hartm.; Carestiaea nivalis (Hook.) Trevis.; Andreaea nivalis var. greschikii G. Roth ex Röll; Andreaea nivalis var. mucronata Chał.; Andreaea macounii Kindb.; Andreaea nivalis var. baileyi Holz.; Andreaea baileyi (Holz.) Holz.; Andreaea nivalis f. fuscescens (Hook.) Mönk.; Andreaea nivalis f. greschikii (G. Roth ex Röll) Podp.; Andreaea nivalis f. mucronata (Chał.) Podp.

= Andreaea nivalis =

Species of moss

Andreaea nivalis, commonly known as snow rock-moss, is a species of moss in the Andreaea family found in Alaska, California, Oregon, Washington, Greenland, Spain, Japan, Russia and Poland. It is black and reddish, dioicous, and grows on wet, acidic rocks. It is threatened by droughts and global warming, and is a near-threatened species on the IUCN red list.

== Description ==
Andreaea nivalis was first described in 1811. It is black and reddish, and grows in dense cushions. Its leaves can be secund to falcate-secund, meaning they can be sickle-shaped, and curved towards one side. They are mostly subulate, meaning they are awl-shaped. The leaves are mainly falcate-secund when dry. When moist, they are more spread out than when dry. The leaves have a strong costa, and they can have a width of 0.16 millimetres (0.0063 in) or more, and a length of 0.8 millimetres (0.031 in) or more. Andreaea nivalis has sharp laminal papillae on its dorsal side, which almost reach to its base, and a very short fruit stalk. Unlike other mosses in its species, which have six-valved capsules, Andreaea nivalis can have capsules with two or four valves. There is always one capsule on each fruiting plant.

== Distribution ==
Andreaea nivalis grows on wet acidic rocks, outcrops, and rocky areas, at medium to high elevations. It can be found in Greenland, Japan, Spain, Alaska, California, Oregon, and Washington. It has also been found in Poland and Spain. It is native to North America, Alaska, the UK, and Norway.

== Reproduction ==
Andreaea nivalis is dioicous, which means its gametophytes only produce either sperm or eggs. Its perichaetial leaves, which enclose the moss's archegonia, reach to the top of the moss's capsules.

== Conservation ==
Andreaea nivalis is near threatened on the IUCN red list. The main threats to this species are drought and global warming. Its population is currently decreasing. The IUCN has recommended land and water protection to conserve this species, and says that research is needed to monitor Andreaea nivalis's population trends.
