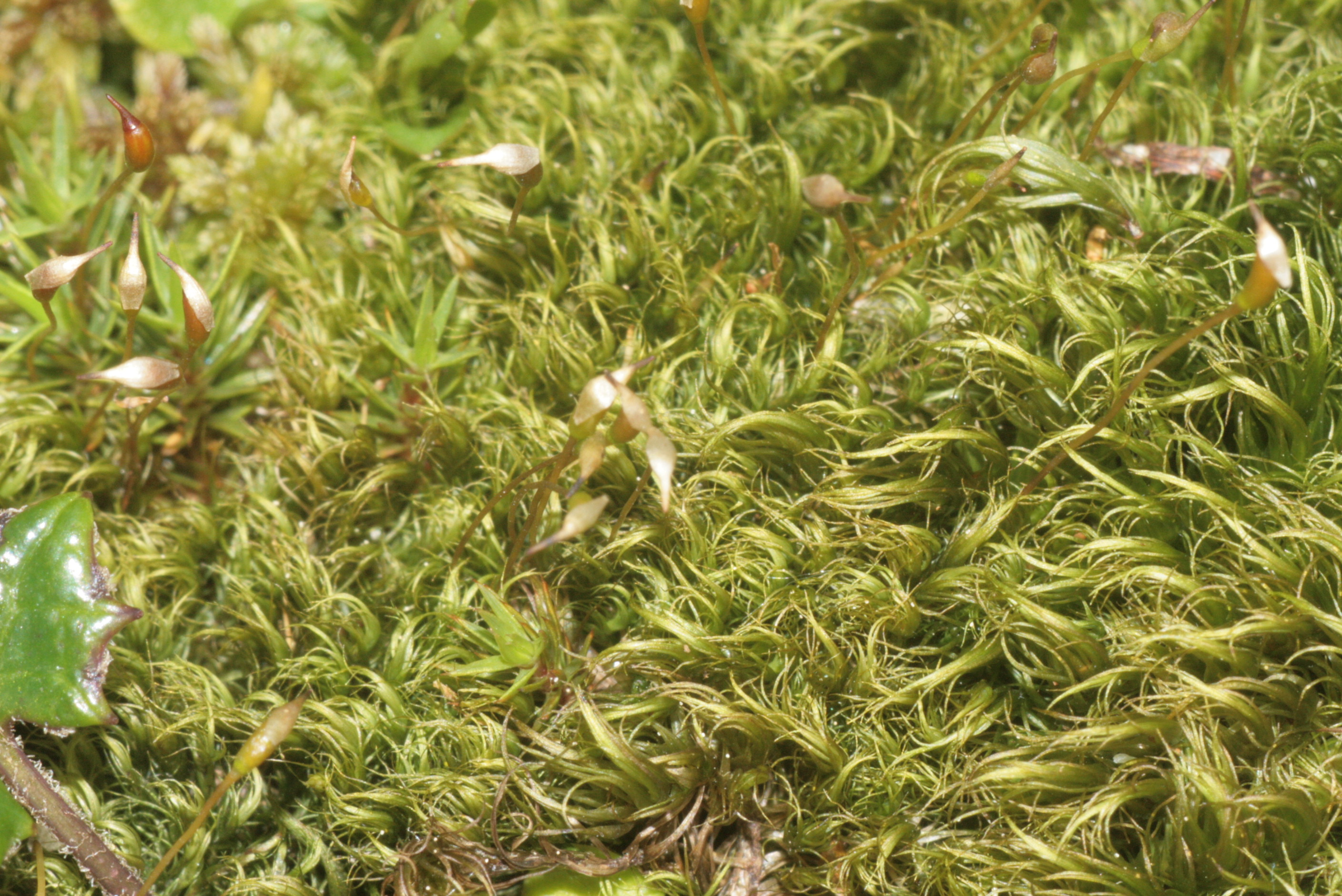
- Kiaeria starkei

Scientific classification
- Kingdom: Plantae
- Division: Bryophyta
- Class: Bryopsida
- Subclass: Dicranidae
- Order: Rhabdoweisiales
- Family: Rhabdoweisiaceae; Limpr.

Genera
- 16 genera, see text

= Rhabdoweisiaceae =

Family of haplolepideous mosses

Rhabdoweisiaceae is a family of haplolepideous mosses in subfamily Dicranidae. It was previously place in the order Dicranales, but is now placed in order Rhabdoweisiales, along with family Rhachitheciaceae.

== Genera ==
The family Rhabdoweisiaceae contains 16 extant genera:

- Arctoa Bruch & Schimp.
- Brideliella Fedosov, M. Stech & Ignatov
- Camptodontium Dusén
- Cnestrum I. Hagen
- Cynodontium Bruch & Schimp.
- Dicranoweisia Lindb. ex Milde
- Eucamptodon Mont.
- Glyphomitrium Brid.
- Kiaeria I. Hagen
- Notocynodontium Larraín & G.M. Suárez
- Oncophorus (Brid.) Brid.
- Oreas Brid.
- Rhabdoweisia Bruch & Schimp.
- Ripariella Fedosov, M. Stech & Ignatov
- Sebillea Bizot
- Symblepharis Mont.

The extinct genus Jamesrossia Z. Walker, Stockey, G.W. Rothwell is also assigned to Rhabdoweisiaceae.
