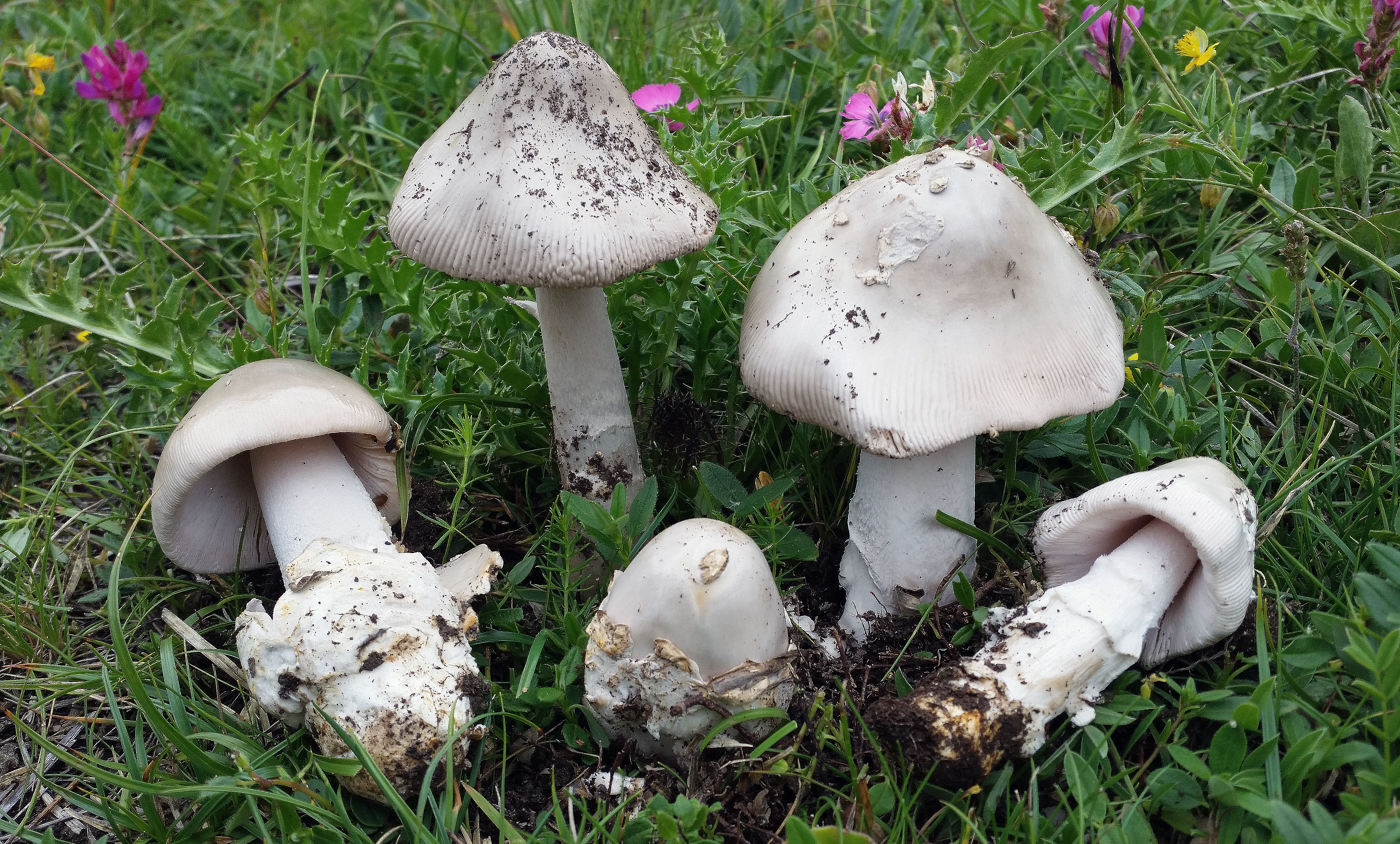

Scientific classification
- Kingdom: Fungi
- Division: Basidiomycota
- Class: Agaricomycetes
- Order: Agaricales
- Family: Amanitaceae
- Genus: Amanita
- Species: A. nivalis

Binomial name
- Amanita nivalis Grev. 1826

Synonyms
- Agaricus nivalis (Grev.) Loudon (1829); Amanitopsis nivalis (Grev.) Sacc., Syll. (1887); Pseudofarinaceus nivalis (Grev.) Kuntze, Revis. (1891); Amanitopsis vaginata var. nivalis (Grev.) Peck, (1894); Vaginata nivalis (Grev.) Kuntze (1898); Amanita vaginata var. nivalis (Grev.) E.-J. Gilbert (1918); Amanita vaginata f. nivalis (Grev.) Veselý (1933); Amanitina nivalis (Grev.) E.-J. Gilbert (1941)

= Amanita nivalis =

Species of fungus

Amanita nivalis
- Mycological characteristics
- Gills on hymenium
- Cap is ovate or umbonate
- Hymenium is free
- Stipe has a volva
- Spore print is white
- Ecology is mycorrhizal

Amanita nivalis, the snow ringless amanita or mountain grisette, is a species of basidiomycete fungus in the genus Amanita.

== Taxonomy ==
A. nivalis was first described by the Scottish mycologist Robert Kaye Greville in 1826 from specimens found growing at high altitudes in the Scottish Highlands. He gave it the Latin epithet nivalis (of the snow) to indicate the alpine type habitat in which he found it growing rather than to describe its white colour.

== Description ==
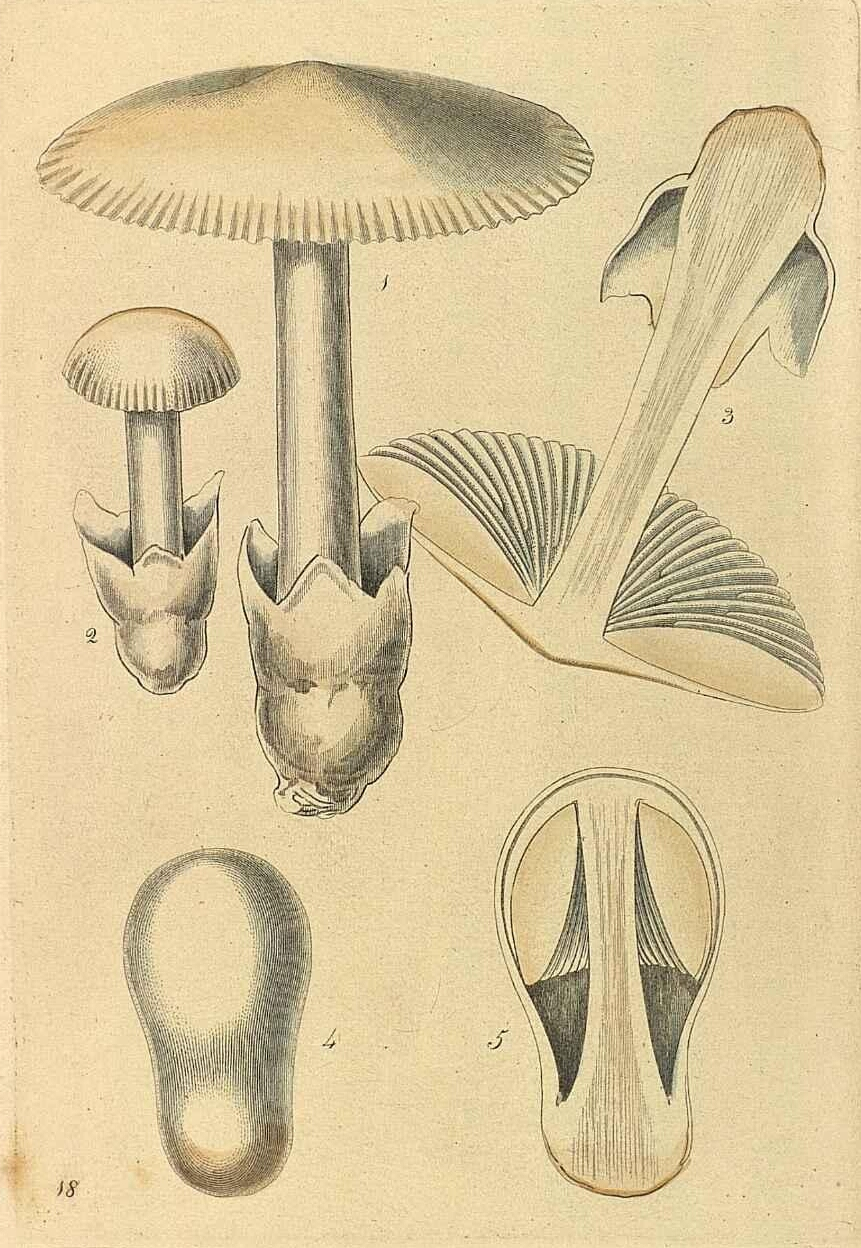
Robert Kaye Greville's original drawing of A. nivalis

A. nivalis is a small species of fungus which is usually white when young, but becomes tinged with grey or buff as it ages. It is rather variable in appearance over its wide range. The cap is dry, smooth and shiny and may be any size between 2 and 8 centimetres (1 and 3 inches). It becomes slightly sticky when wet. It is hemispherical when young, but flattens out with age and develops a slight umbo. Near the rim there are fine radiating striations and the surface of the cap may have a few pieces of the membranous volva adhering to it. The gills are pale cream, broad, fairly crowded and mostly unconnected to the stem. There are a few irregularly arranged shorter gills with truncated ends. The stem is 3.8 to 10 cm (1 1/2 to 4 in) long and 5 to 12 millimetres (1/4 to 1/2 in) wide, hollow and with a smooth surface. There may be a fragile ring, but it soon falls off. The base of the stem grows out of a brittle, sac-like volva which is white or pale yellowish-brown. The spores are nearly spherical, being 10.0 to 13.5 micrometres by 8.8 to 12.0 μm. This species is said to have an undistinguished odour and flavour.

== Distribution and habitat ==
It grows in subarctic and alpine conditions in Europe and also in Greenland. It is often associated with low growing willows (Salix spp.) and birches (Betula spp.). There have been reports of it occurring at high altitudes in the Rocky Mountains in North America. The fruit bodies appear singly or in small groups in both silicaceous and limestone areas in summer.

== Conservation ==
Although the edibility of this species is unknown, because of its rarity, it is best not to gather it.
