= Wilhelm Mönkemeyer =

German bryologist (1862–1938)

- Born: 24 December 1862; Stadtoldendorf
- Died: 1 March 1938; Leipzig
- Scientific career
- Fields: Bryology

Wilhelm Mönkemeyer (24 December 1862, in Stadtoldendorf – 1 March 1938, in Leipzig) was a German bryologist.

In 1883–85 he worked as a botanical collector in tropical Africa (present-day Congo, Equatorial Guinea, Gabon and Nigeria). In 1887 he began work as an Obergehilfe (upper assistant) at the botanical garden of Göttingen and from 1889 to 1928 served as a garden inspector at the botanical garden in Leipzig.

His moss herbarium was sold to the Botanical Institute in Hamburg. Taxa with the specific epithet of moenkemeyeri commemorate his name, an example being Riccia moenkemeyeri.

== Selected writings ==
- Die Sumpf- und Wasserpflanzen ihre Beschreibung, Kultur und Verwendung, (Marsh and aquatic plants, their description, culture and use); (1897).
- Bryales (mosses). - In: A. Pascher, Süsswasser-flora. Deutschlands, Österreichs und der Schweiz. Gustav Fischer, Jena. 14: 39-168, (1914).
- Die Laubmoose Europas (The mosses of Europe). - In: L. Rabenhorst, Kryptogamen-Flora von Deutschland, Österreich und der Schweiz, 2nd Edition, Volume 4, Supplement. Akademische Verlagsgesellschaft, Leipzig. 960 pp. (1927)
- Bryales (mosses). - In: A. Pascher: Süßwasser-flora Mitteleuropas, 2nd edition, Gustav Fischer, Jena. 14: 47-197. (1931).
