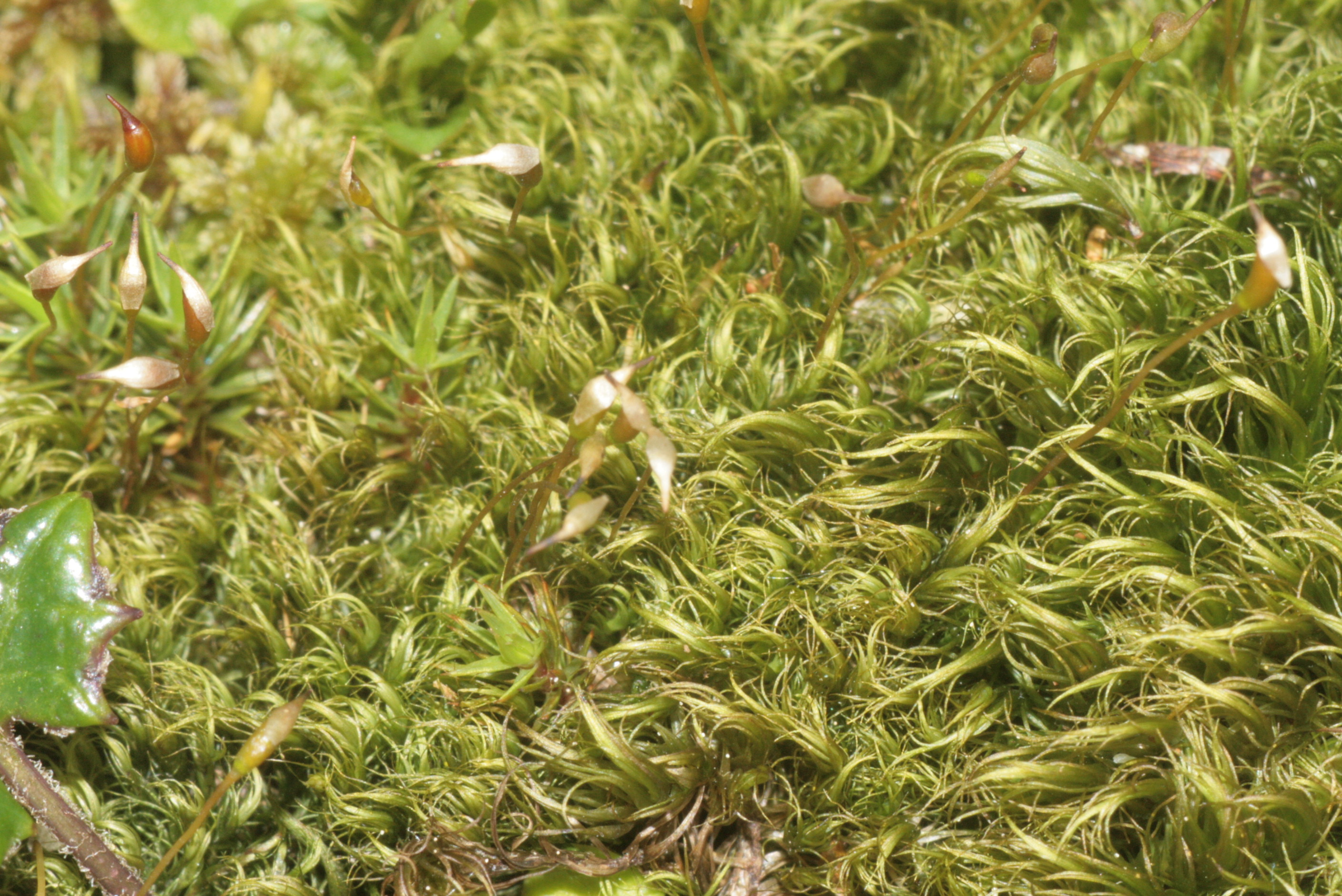
- Kiaeria starkei

Scientific classification
- Kingdom: Plantae
- Division: Bryophyta
- Class: Bryopsida
- Subclass: Dicranidae
- Order: Rhabdoweisiales; D. Bell & Goffinet

Families
- Rhabdoweisiaceae; Rhachitheciaceae

= Rhabdoweisiales =

Order of haplolepideous mosses

Rhabdoweisiales is an order of haplolepideous mosses in the subclass Dicranidae. Its two families, Rhabdoweisiaceae and Rhachitheciaceae, were previously placed in Dicranales.
