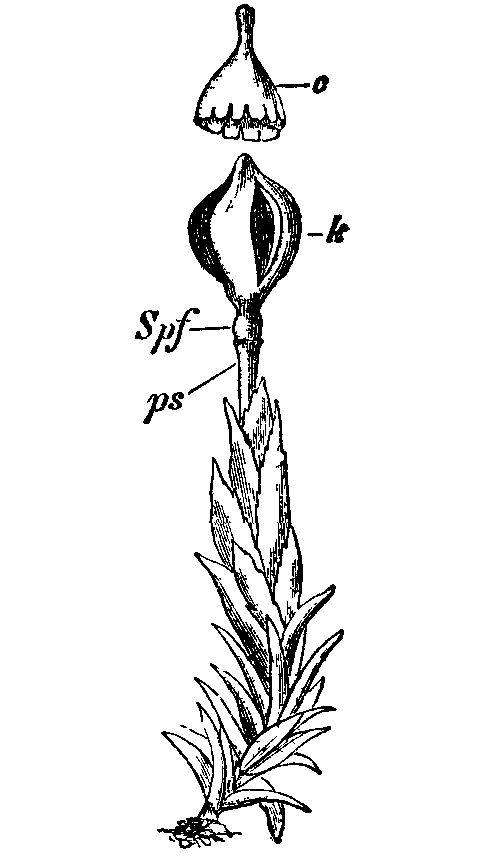
- Andreaea rupestris

Scientific classification
- Kingdom: Plantae
- Division: Bryophyta
- Class: Andreaeopsida; J.H. Schaffn.
- Order: Andreaeales; Limpr.
- Family: Andreaeaceae; Dumort.

Genera
- Acroschisma; Andreaea

= Andreaeaceae =

Family of mosses

Andreaeaceae is a family of mosses which includes two genera, Andreaea, containing about 100 species, and the genus Acroschisma. The Andreaeaceae prefer rocky habitats ranging from tropical to arctic climates, on which they form tufted colonies, typically with reddish to blackish shoots. The capsules lack the peristome mechanism and dehisce longitudinally to release the spores, resulting in a paper-lantern appearance.

It was named by Jakob Friedrich Ehrhart in honour of his friend J.G.R. Andreae.

order Andreaeales

family Andreaeaceae

Acroschisma (Hook.f. & Wilson) Lindl.
Andreaea Hedw.

- - Takakiopsida
  - Sphagnopsida
  - - - Andreaeaceae
      - Andreaeobryopsida
      - - Oedipodiopsida
        - - Tetraphidopsida
          - Polytrichopsida
          - Bryopsida

The phylogenetic position of the Andreaeaceae among the eight classes of mosses, based on inferences from DNA sequence data.
