= Moss lawn =

Lawn composed of moss

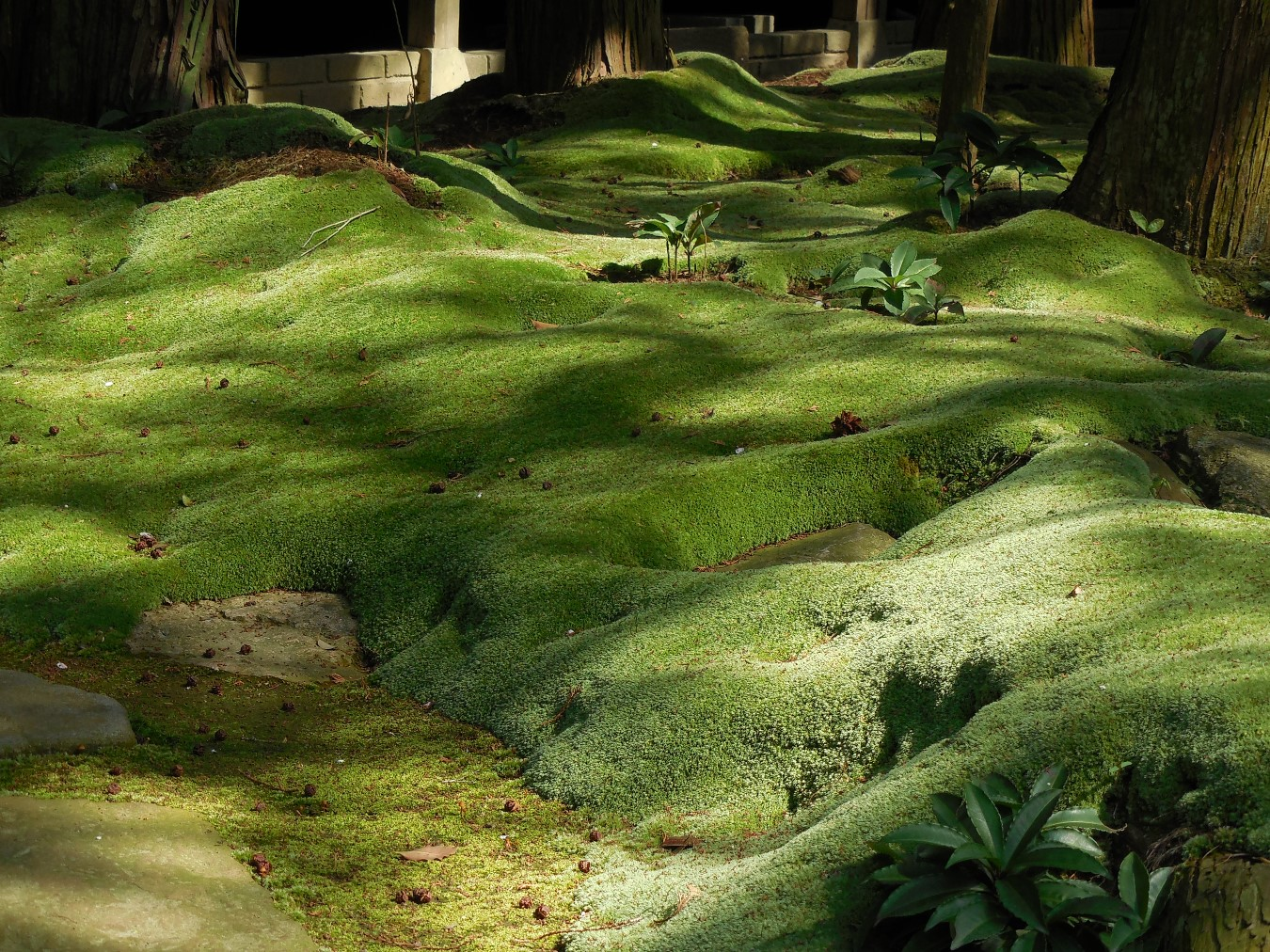
Moss garden at the Kōzan-ji temple in Shimonoseki, Japan

Moss lawns are lawns composed of moss, which occur naturally, but can also be cultivated like grass lawns. They are a defining element in moss gardens.

Moss lawns are drought-tolerant and rarely need misting once established (the average US grass lawn uses a hundred times as much water). They do not require mowing, fertilizing, or other amendments, and grow on almost any substrate (apart from metal), and at any soil pH and light level. They can grow under conifers, swallowing the needles, but fallen broad deciduous leaves will kill them if not removed. They can be walked on but not scuffed.

== Uses ==
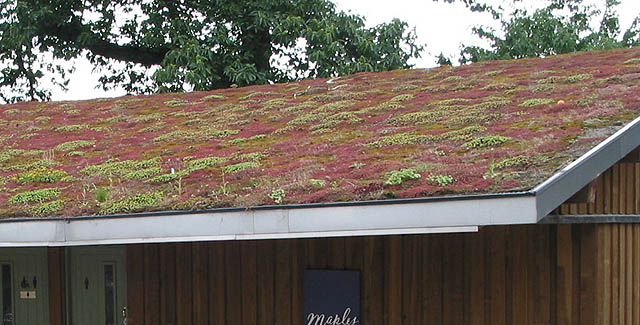
Red moss cultivated on a green roof

Mosses are squishy and compress without being damaged, but they are easily torn by tension. Moss lawns can therefore stand being walked on, but not being scuffed. They tend to be too moist to sit upon comfortably.

Moss lawns can be used as a living mulch; they retain moisture, do not become compacted, and do not require annual replacement. A moss layer can act as a physical barrier to prevent germination of vascular plants. Moss also hosts symbiotic nitrogen-fixing bacteria, similarly to clover, and when mosses are dried and wetted, they release nitrogen and carbon into the soil. Mosses reduce losses of soil moisture to evapotranspiration; when saturated, mosses reduce water infiltration into soil. Mosses thermally insulate the soil.

Moss lawns may be used to cover green roofs. They are also used as an erosion-control groundcover, along the banks of watercourses, under flowing water, and on steep slopes.

=== Visual effects ===
Traditional Japanese garden aesthetics avoids contrasts, symmetries and groupings that would create points which dominate visual attention, instead creating scenes in which visual salience is evenly distributed across the field of view. Stand-out colours, textures, objects, and groups are avoided. The size of objects, groupings, and the spacings between them are arranged to be self-similar at multiple spatial scales; that is, they produce similar patterns when scaled up or down (zoomed in or out). This property is also seen in fractals and many natural scenes. This self-similarity may be extended all the way down to the scale of surface textures. The mottled texture and colour of moss (like that of rocks) can be used as part of such self-similar, evenly-distributed-salience designs. Moss is considered to express a wabi-sabi aesthetic.

== Maintenance ==
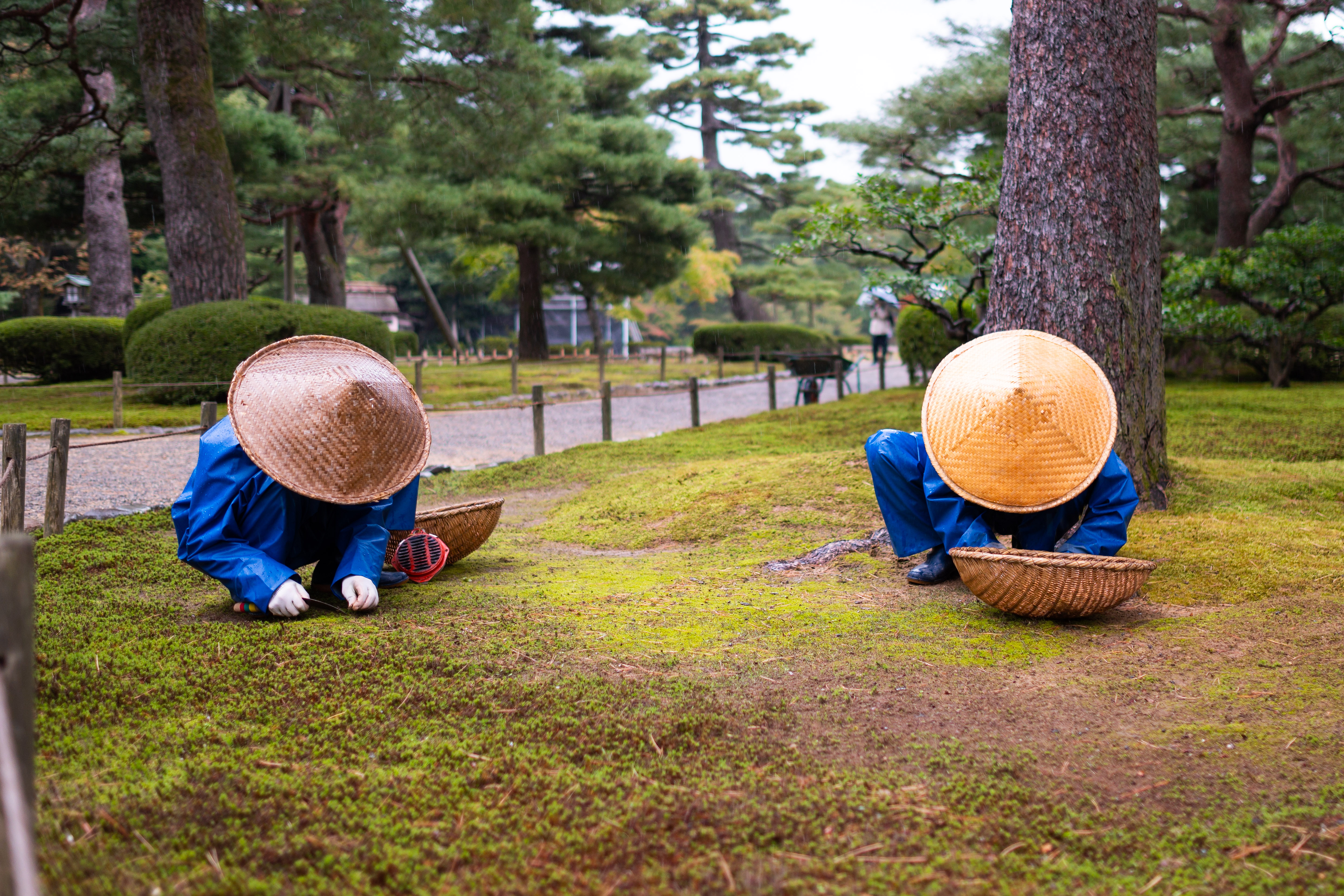
Removing weeds by hand from a thin area of Kenroku-en, a famous garden.

In the wild, mosses may naturally form a continuous lawn under conifers; the more upright mosses, such as Hylocomium splendens, can grow over falling needles. For mosses not adapted to a continuous fall of needles, though, needles can cause mould. Deciduous trees are quite different; deciduous leaves are wider, and they fall abruptly. While some mosses grow under deciduous trees in nature, a blanket of dead leaves or other debris can smother a moss lawn. Leaving the leaves on the moss short-term does not harm the moss, but long-term, most leaves should be kept off the moss. In traditional Japanese gardens, moss under deciduous trees is swept clear with a broom; more modernly, a leaf blower may be used. It is also possible to temporarily lay down netting (but not metal netting, which is toxic to moss). The shed leaves land on the netting, and when the leaves have finished falling, netting and leaves can be rolled up together and removed.

Moss lawns do not require fertilizer or other soil amendments, as moss lacks a root system. Moss lawns do not need mowing, although there are a few species which can be mown.

While moss requires some moisture, its water demands are moderate; one percent or less of the water needed by an average US grass lawn. It does not benefit from deep watering. Moss lawns are drought-resistant after they have become established; they are among the most drought-resistant garden plants. The moss will become dormant in less favourable conditions. Moss thus generally only needs watering until it is established. When rehydrated, it recovers and becomes green within seconds. Misting for a minute or two a day will keep a moss lawn green. Overwatering can kill moss; most species cannot stand being waterlogged, though some (like Sphagnum) require it, and others grow only underwater.

Mosses stay green at moderately sub-freezing temperatures, and thus remain green all winter in many climates. A layer of snow will insulate it; it may grow under light snow cover. Some mosses depend on seasonal snow cover.

Moss lawns do fine on compacted soil; an area in which moss is cultivated should not be aerated or scarified.

Weeding is generally needed. For smooth mosses, weeds can be kept down with a string trimmer on idle. Weeds tend to be excluded as the moss grows thicker. Acrocarpous mosses tend to be thicker and better at excluding weeds. Grazing may also encourage moss. Grazers such as deer and rabbits often will not eat moss.

== Conditions ==
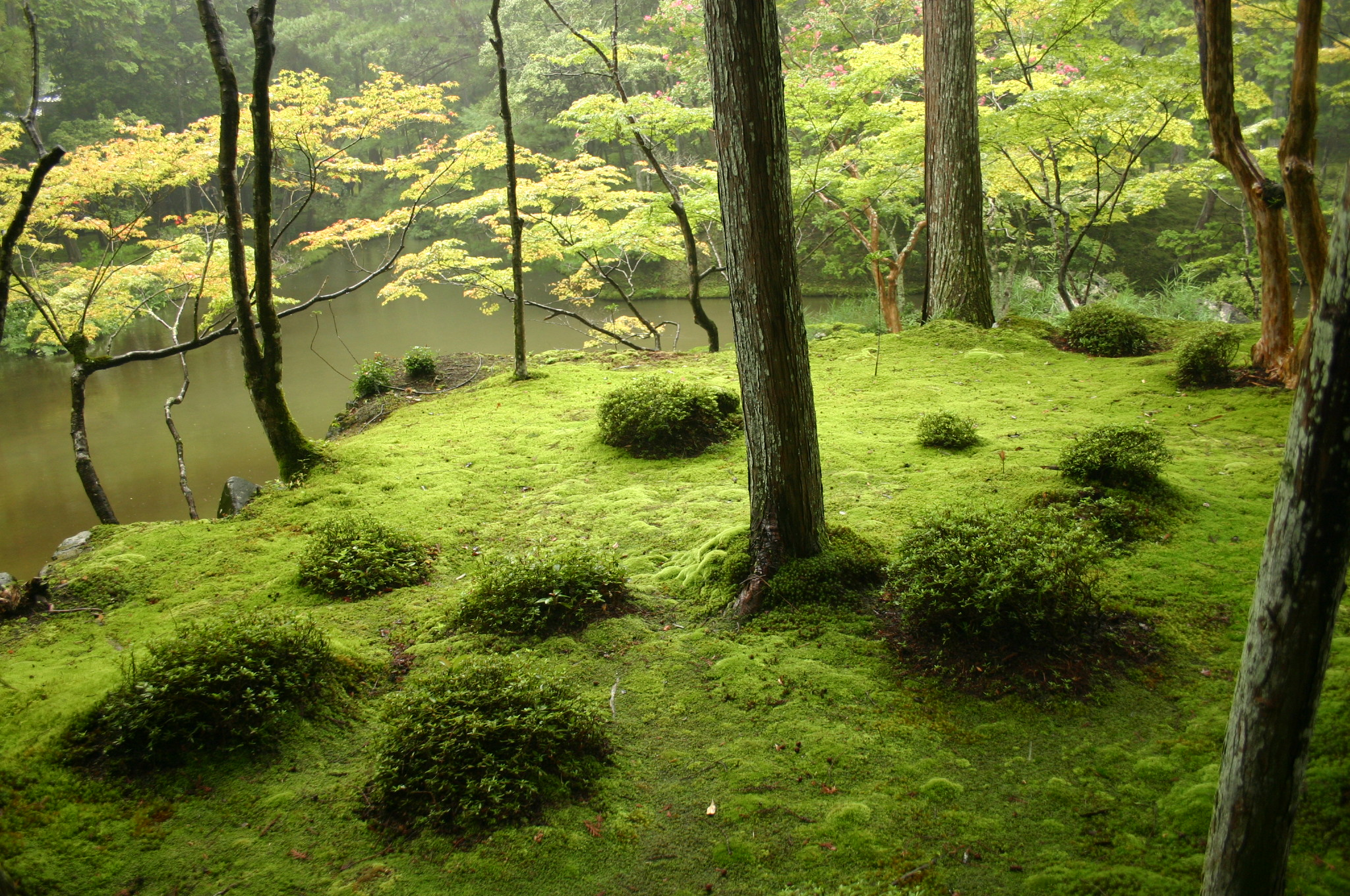
A light and moisture gradient at the Kokedera moss garden, Saihō-ji temple, Kyoto, Japan. Note multiple different moss types.

The mosses can live in a broader range of habitats than the flowering plants can. Different species of mosses have very different needs, and needs quite different from flowering plants. They are, however, often excluded by competition from flowering plants, and thus generally grow in places where flowering plants cannot.

=== Light levels ===
Moss lawns can grow in anything from blazing sun to full shade, but different species are specialized to different light levels. Annual variations in sun exposure need to be taken into account; space under deciduous trees may be seasonally sunny, and require sun-tolerant species.

=== Substrate ===
Mosses do not grow roots into the soil, but most mosses need to attach rhizomes to the substrate in order to grow and remain in place; this is assisted by clearing and smoothing a lawn substrate and fairing a fillet between vertical and horizontal surfaces. Loose debris and sharp angles discourage moss growth. While preparing for the moss, curves and mounds may be sculpted (this is easiest in clayey soil), and a hose may be used to erode the edges of shapes. Established moss can resist flowing water and secure steep slopes. While some beach species specialize in growing on shifting sands, and may grow on sandy, salty roadside soil in cities, most mosses are very slow to colonize loose-shifting surfaces. Depressions in moss lawns may fill with debris.

There are moss species that grow on almost any substrate, including rocks, wood, or soil. The rhizoids grow into any soil, in some cases about as deep as the moss is tall, in order to hold the moss in place. Generally, mosses do not absorb nutrients from the soil, so soil amendments do not benefit moss. Many mosses are ombrotrophic, fed by rain.

=== pH, moisture and temperature ===
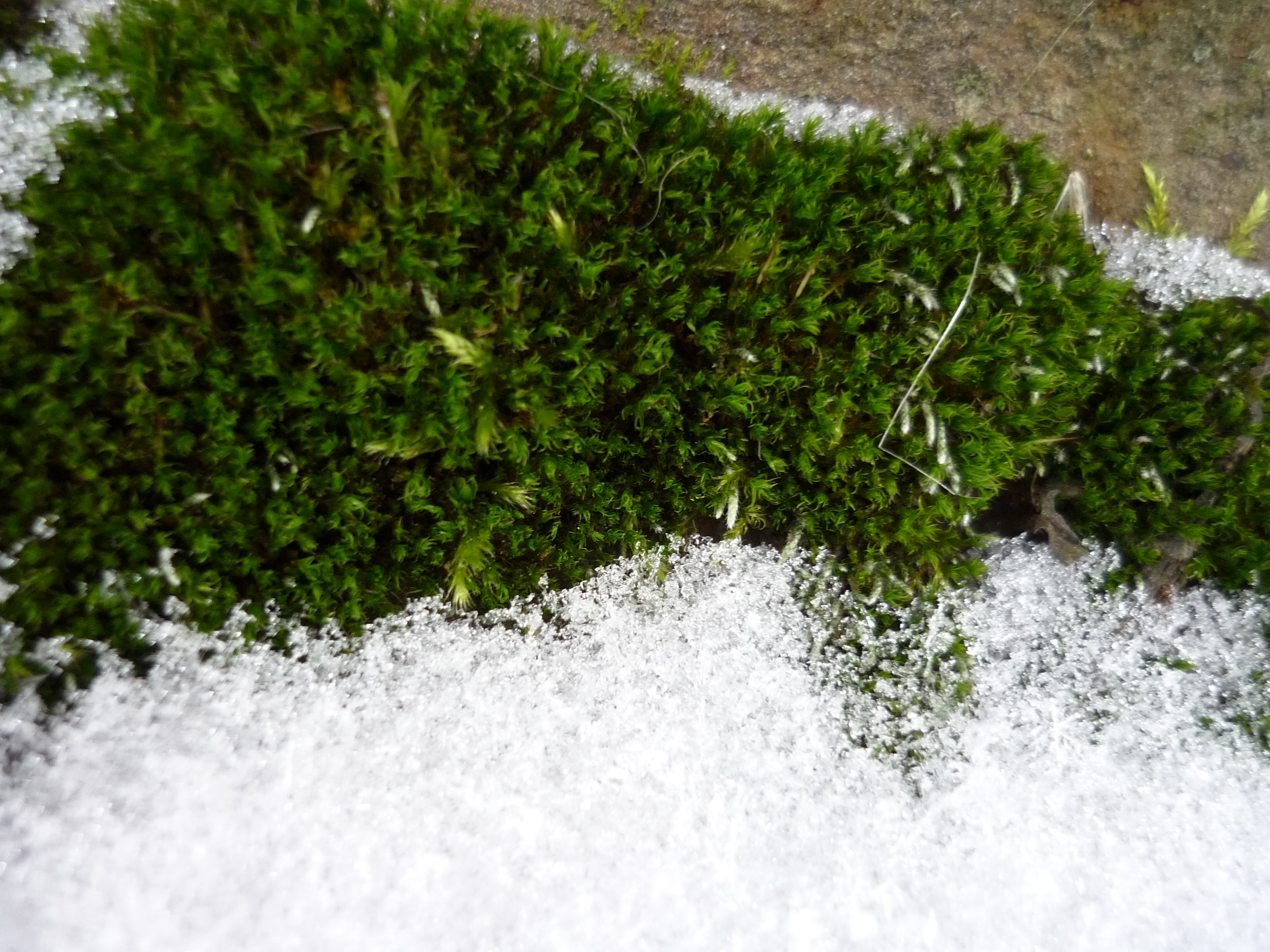
Melting snow provides moisture and cool temperatures, which encourage moss growth.

There are moss species that are suited to the full range of soil pHs, but some gardeners adjust the pH to discourage other plants which might compete with the moss. Many other plants do badly in acidic soil; moss thrives in acidic soil conditions. This also reduces the risk of limescale deposits on the moss, which can wick water up from waterlogged soil; regularly rinsing with rainwater from above will wash off deposits. Mosses absorb water through their leaves, and are watered more like air plants than common vascular garden plants. Watering with hard tapwater may also cause lime deposits; soft tapwater may contain dissolved metals, which can kill moss. Japanese moss gardens largely rely on natural precipitation, with the garden creating conditions where the moss will spontaneously grow. Shelter from wind will reduce evaporation, which helps keep mosses from drying out.

To photosynthesize, moss needs sunlight (not necessarily direct), moisture, and temperatures above about -5 degrees Celsius (23 Fahrenheit) simultaneously. Unlike most other plants, it cannot store energy for use later (except for in a storage protein used to repair cell walls). This means that watering moss will not increase growth unless it will stay wet, unfrozen, and at least slightly lit for some hours afterwards. Moss has little ability to retain water; it is poikilohydrous. If dried-out or frozen, it becomes dormant. Becoming dormant takes energy, so rapid wet-dry cycles can cause a net energy loss. Light, frequent watering can allow moss to grow quickly, while leaving the lawn too dry for other plants, which need water to soak in to the soil. Once established, moss does not require watering, and is more drought-tolerant than most plants. Moss can survive frozen for centuries, and revive when thawed. Moss has internal antifreeze, which allows it to grow at temperatures a few degrees below freezing.

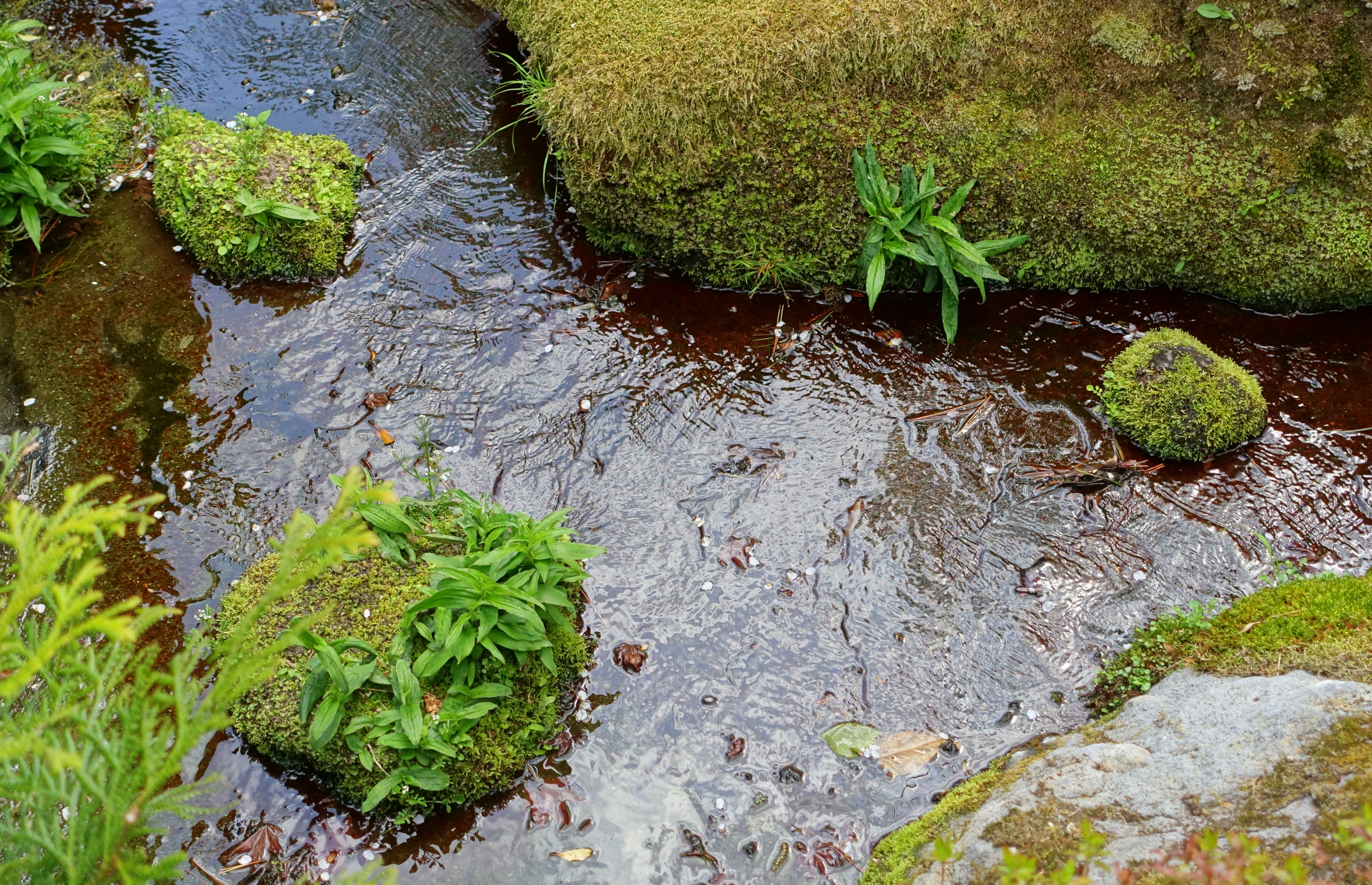
Sekirakuen Garden in Hakone, Japan

Young mosses take a protonemal form, which is more like an algal film than a moss; small moss fragments may revert to this state. Moss in a protonemal state is much more likely to die if dried out. When it converts to the gametophyte form, after a few weeks, it becomes much more drought-resistant.

A sprinkler or misting system, automated on a timer, is often used to get mosses established. Spray times of 2–5 minutes, thrice daily, are typical, but this may vary with the moss species.

Mosses can grow next to water features, but the unvarying level of artificial watercourses may not allow the moss to dry out, which can cause problems with mould.

== Starting moss lawns ==
Moss lawns can be started by several different methods:

- Buying sheets of moss from plant nurseries and transplanting. Because moss can go dormant for long periods, it is easy to ship.
  - Wild-collected: moss collection from the wild has led to serious environmental problems in some areas. Many plant, animal, and insect species live intermingled with moss and are gathered with it (see invasive species); much moss is traded locally, but some is shipped internationally. Moss collection has been banned in parts of the United States. Mossers collect moss from the wild.
  - Cultivated: due to the slow growth of moss, tends to be expensive. There are efforts to speed the growth of moss in order to make moss cultivation more cost-effective.
- Dividing moss already in the garden, and allowing the patches to spread and merge.
  - Moss does better if divided when dry and thus dormant.
  - Moss can be divided and propagated while frozen, but the rhizomes are more flexible and attach better if the moss is thawn, not frozen, while being set out.
  - Spreading moss with yogurt, buttermilk, beer, or manure tea, though widely advocated, is not helpful to the moss and can cause mould. Polymer gel and clay can be used to thicken a slurry of moss fragments.
  - Moss can be transplanted within a garden.
- Weed and encourage: weeding out non-moss species, and encouraging the moss with moisture.
  - Both are generally necessary; in most gardens, the moss will not expand into a full carpet without an initial period of watering to tip the balance.
  - Repeatedly mowing an area to a very short height all summer, then watering heavily, may help the moss outcompete the vascular plants. Many grass lawns already have moss living under the grass.
- Letting the moss come: preparing good conditions for moss, and allowing naturally occurring spores to seed it.
  - Moss spores are everywhere, regardless of whether moss is growing nearby, as they are carried long distances by wind; they are carried hemisphere-wide by the jet streams. They germinate to algae-like protonema, which then convert to more robust gametophytes.
  - Species suited to the local conditions tend to do better.
  - This is the technique used in Japanese moss gardens.

=== Transplanting ===
When transplanting moss on to soil, the soil surface is slightly loosened first. After the moss is in place, it is thoroughly watered and walked on or otherwise tamped down. This helps attach the transplanted moss to the soil.

Transplanted moss may be secured to a new substrate with small twigs or metal pegs. Pond netting or tulle, held with landscape staples or tent pegs, or sometimes suspended on stakes, may be used to discourage wildlife from digging up moss.

== Species used in moss lawns ==
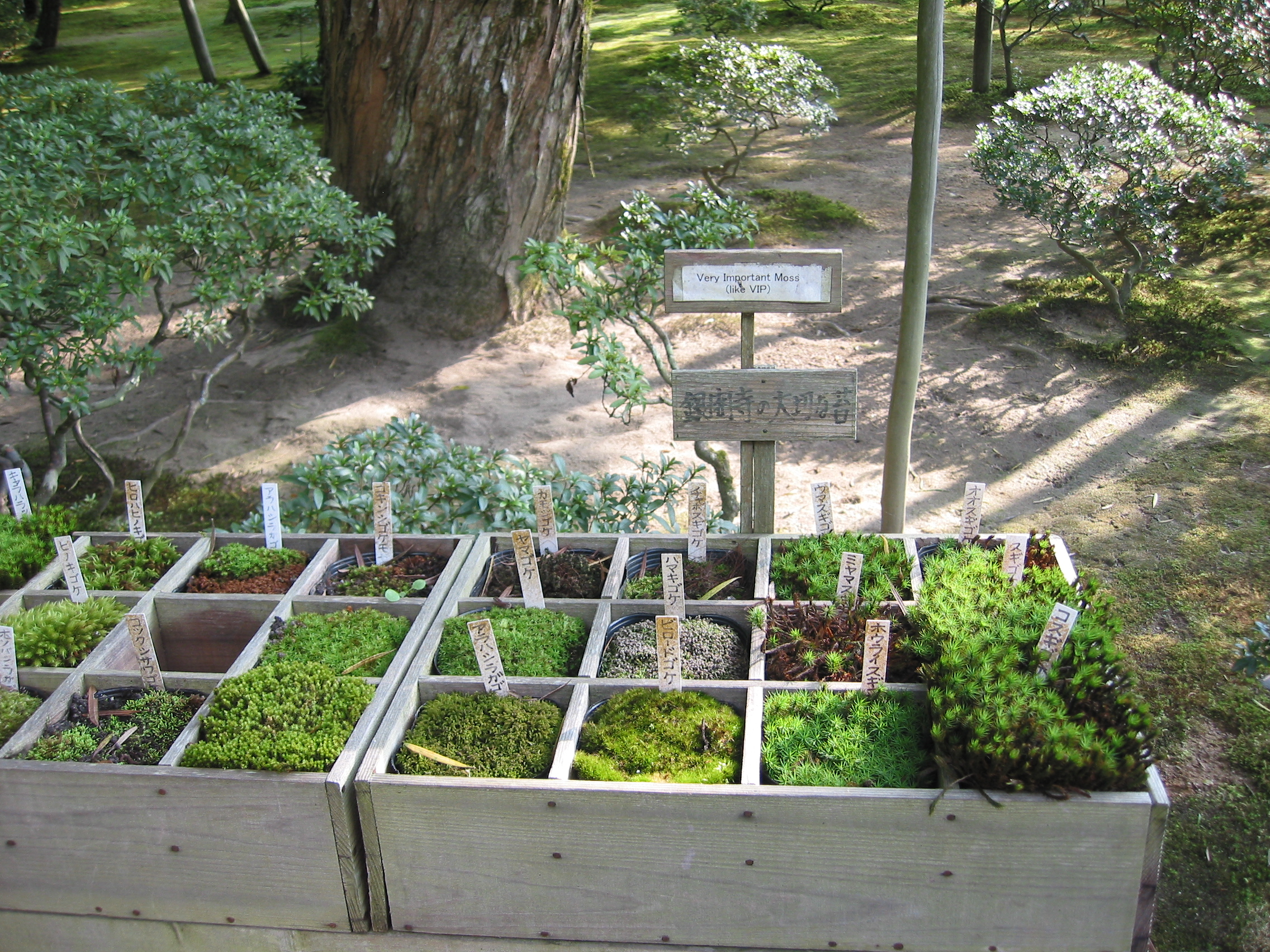
A labelled collection of some of the garden mosses at Ginkakuji (see file description page for species)

Several species of moss can be grown in moss lawns. Mosses that are native to a local area take less time to establish and maintain. It is difficult to have moss thrive when transplanted even short distances; however, it is sometimes possible to set up a habitat for the desired species to colonize. An average garden may have about a dozen moss species growing in it already, though identifying them may be difficult.

In the moss trade, generic descriptive terms are often used instead of species names. For instance, "sheet moss" is any moss with a sheet-like habit; in the US, usually Thuidium delicatulum (delicate fern moss), Hypnum imponens (flat fern moss), or Hypnum curvifolium (curvy fern moss); similarly, "mood moss" is any species that forms cushions or clumps, in the US usually Dicranum species.

The acrocarps (cushion mosses) and pleurocarps (carpet mosses) represent major morphological types within the clade of "true mosses" Bryopsida.

=== Pleurocarps ===
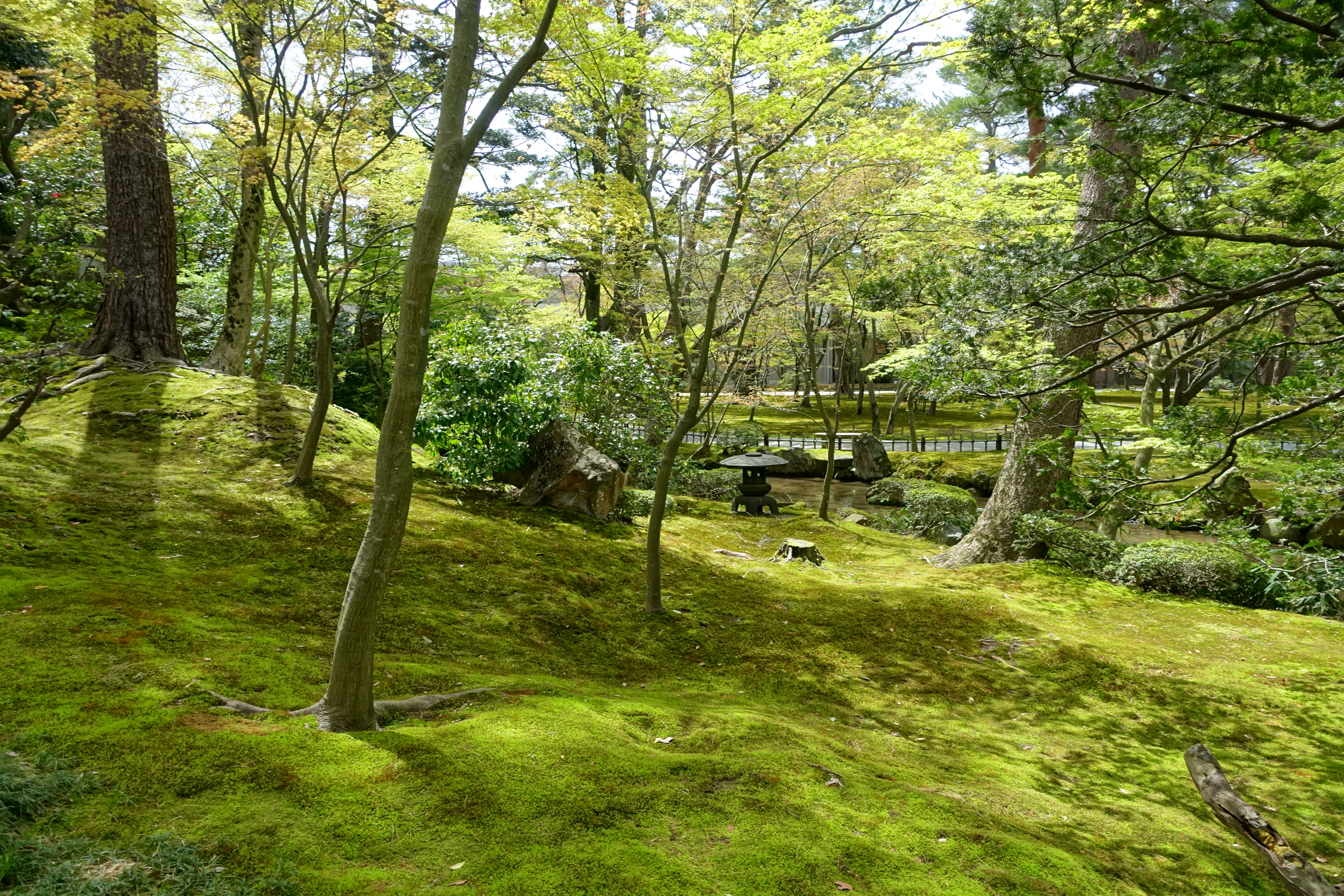
Hillside pleurocarp lawn at Kenroku-en

Prostrate, creeping, branching; smooth sheetlike; fast to regenerate from fragments and faster-growing, with maximum growth rates allowing them to double in size every six months. They are earlier-succession than acrocarps. They can live constantly moist or even submerged, and may be watered as often as six times a day; however, if they become soggy they will grow fungi, including mould and mildew. This is particularly common at temperatures above 24 °C (75 °F).

- Hypnum sp.; deep to moderate shade, will resist some foot traffic.
  - Hypnum cupressiforme
  - Hypnum imponens (flat fern moss)
- Entodon seductrix; semi-sun
- Climacium (tree moss): semi-sun, damp
  - Climacium americanum: Resists erosion, waterlogging; used for stormwater control.
  - Climacium dendroides
- Thuidium delicatulum (Common Fern Moss, Delicate Thuidium Moss); sun to medium shade, moisture, shelter from wind. Will grow on logs and rough rocks. Resists erosion. Turns golden in the autumn.
- Plagiomnium cuspidatum (Toothed Plagiomnium Moss, Woodsy Thyme-moss)
- Bryandersonia illecebra

=== Acrocarps ===
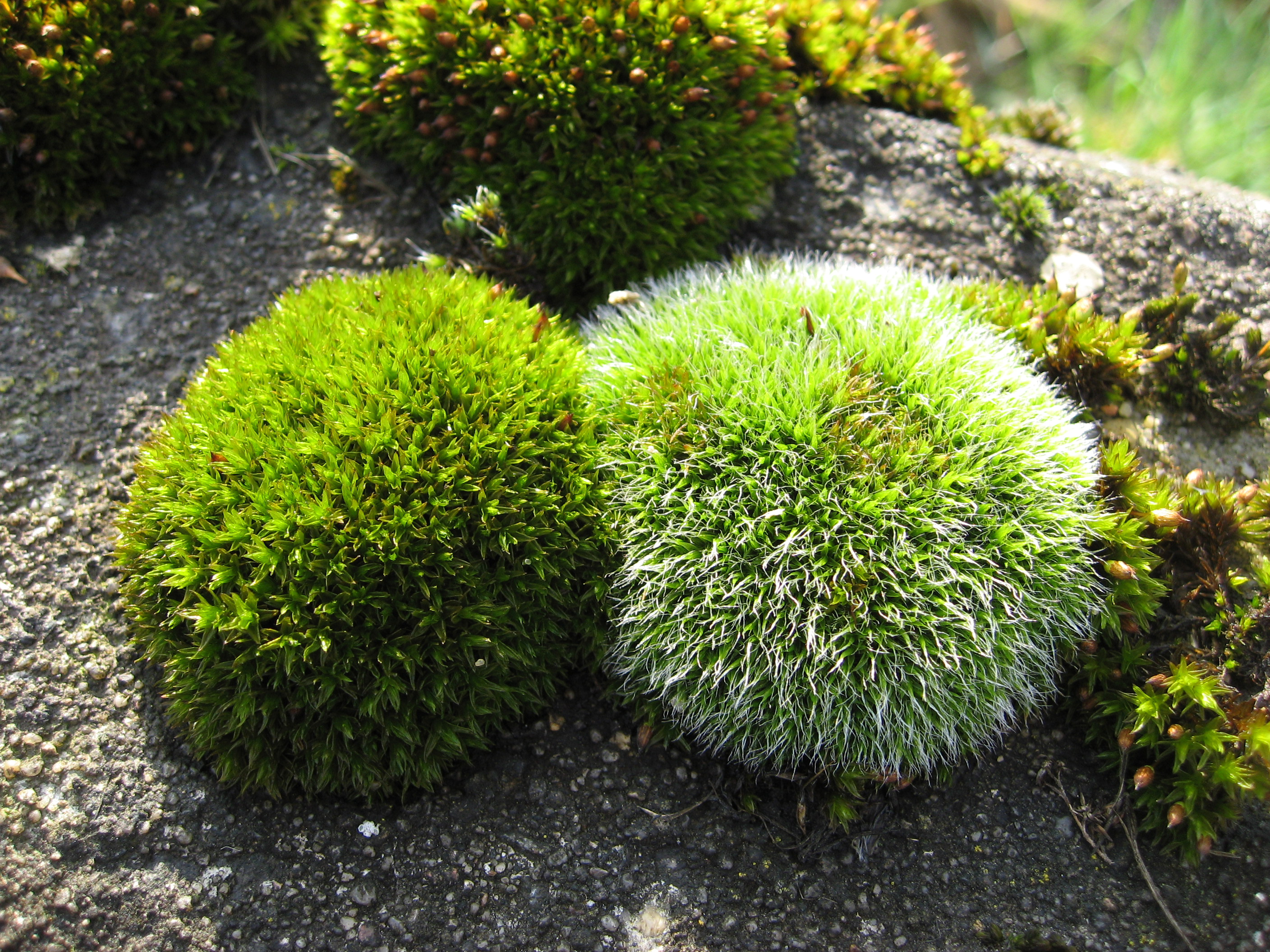
Acrocarps: Schistidium sp. (left), Grimmia pulvinata (right)

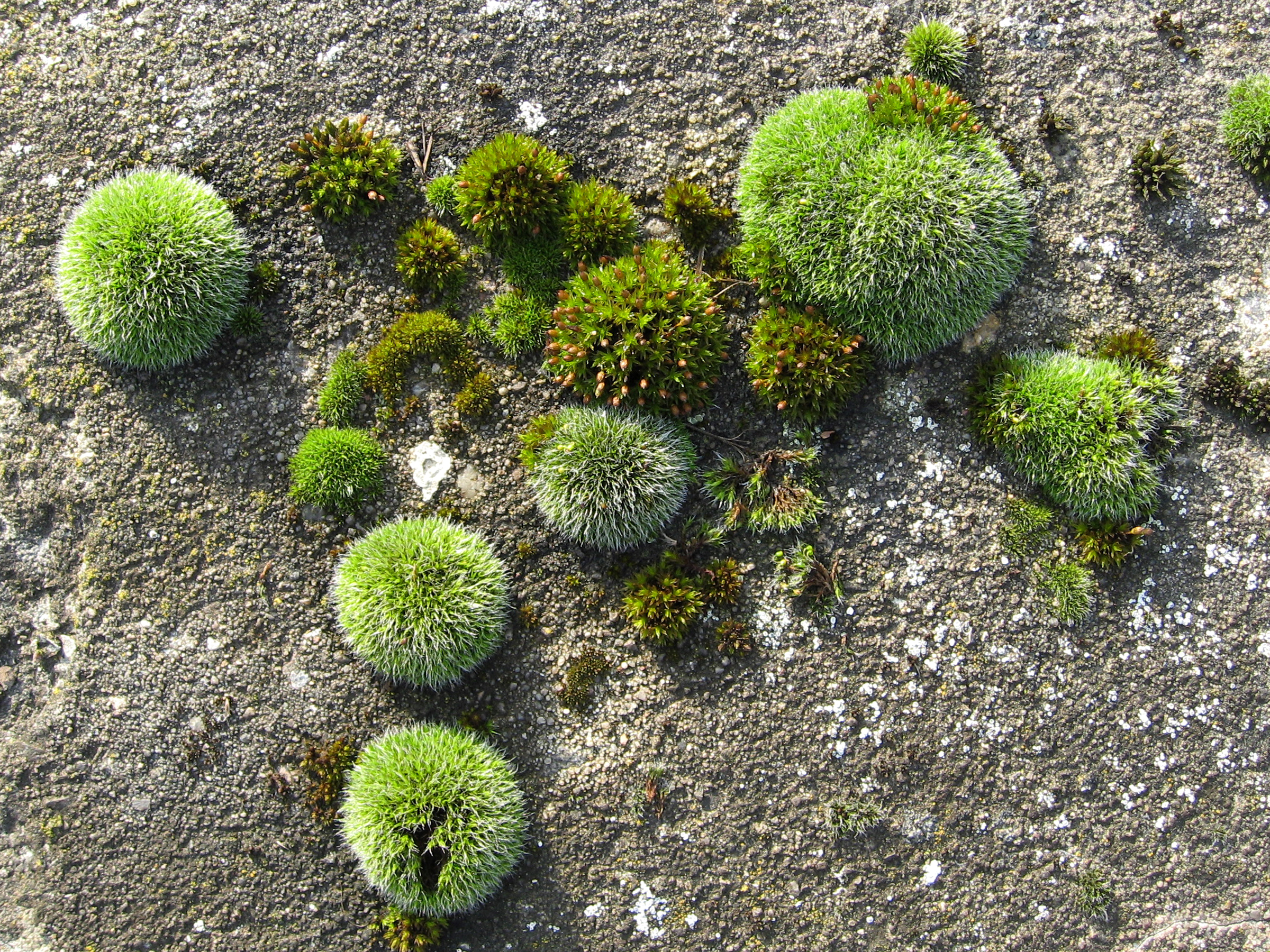
Assorted acrocarps on a wall

Acrocarps are thick, upright, mounded/clumping in habit, and slower-growing. Acrocarps need to dry out regularly. If constantly moist for more than 2–3 months, they will rot, and they will not grow completely submerged. They are generally more drought-tolerant than pleurocarps.

- Polytrichum commune (haircap moss, awned haircap moss, blue moss, blue hairy cap); sandy, acidic soil; deep shade if dry, sunnier if wetter, will resist some foot traffic. Can be mown lightly. Resists erosion, as it has unusually deep rhizoids.
- Rock cap moss (Dicranum sp.); rocks or soil, deep shade only
  - Dicranum scoparium (Broom Fork Moss, mood moss, windswept moss, broom moss, footstool moss, cushion moss)
- Leucobryum species
  - Leucobryum glaucum (Cushion moss, pincushion moss, white moss); silvery clumping moss that favours sandy soil, shade to light sun Generalist species with a wide distribution.
  - Leucobryum albidum
- Campylopus introflexus (an alien invasive in the northern hemisphere)
- Aloina aloides; likes sun, survives sand and salt; grows on sand dunes and at the margins of city roads.
- Atrichum species
  - Atrichum undulatum (big star moss, crane moss, crown moss, starburst moss); adapted to shady, moist, areas; resists foot traffic well. Grows to an even height.
  - Atrichum angustatum; similar to A. undulatum, but broader range of soil moistures.
- Bryum
  - Bryum argentium
  - Bryum caespiticium (tufted thread moss); indirect sun or shade. Dries to brown.
- Ceratodon purpureus (fire moss, red roof moss); will grow in full sun and pollution. Robust and brightly coloured.

== See also ==
- List of garden features
- Clover lawn
- Tapestry lawn
- Saihō-ji (Kyoto) (Kokedera moss garden)
- Schistostega
- Poikilohydry (ability to revive from a desiccated state)
- Moss is often ombrotrophic
