= Nance Wood =

Site of Special Scientific Interest in Cornwall, England

- Site of Special Scientific Interest
- Location within Cornwall
- Location of Nance Wood.
- Area of search: Cornwall
- Grid reference: SW665450
- Coordinates: 50.2587°N 5.2773°W
- Interest: Biological
- Area: 9.8 hectares (0.0980 km^{2}; 0.0378 sq mi)
- Notification date: 1951

Nance Wood is a woodland Site of Special Scientific Interest (SSSI) near Portreath, west Cornwall. The site was first notified in 1951 for its almost pure dwarf, sessile oak (Quercus petraea) coppiced woodland, good bryophyte flora and Irish spurge (Euphorbia hyberna), which is found in only two localities in Britain.

== Geography ==
Nance Wood Site of Special Scientific Interest is a narrow strip of semi-natural woodland, on a steep north-facing slope, which was designated as a SSSI for its biological characteristics. The wood's eastern boundary is beside the hamlet of Bridge and the western boundary is at the inland edge of Portreath. Also included are the Illogan Woods, a small side valley on the western side of the SSSI. Most of the woodland trees are 4–6 metres (13–20 ft) high, wind-pruned, sessile oak (Quercus petraea) which were last coppiced in the first half of the 20th century. The woods are one of only two sites in Britain to contain Irish spurge (Euphorbia hyberna), a Red Data Book plant. The B3000 (road) from Redruth runs alongside the stream to Portreath, and at the top of the valley slope, but not within the SSSI, are agricultural fields and Nance Round, an Iron Age defended settlement.

== History ==
Overlooking the valley at the top of a north-facing slope is Nance Round, an Iron Age defended settlement, which survives as a roughly oval area with double ramparts with ditches. The outer rampart is up to 1.8 m high and the inner rampart up to 2.4 m. The British Iron Age dates from 800BC to 100AD.

Pheasant shooting during the late-Victorian era was a popular pastime for landowners and their guests and thousands were raised yearly by gamekeepers. Local people were employed as ″beaters″, advancing in a line towards butts, where men waited with their rifles to shoot the birds flying above. Nance Round was perfect for use as a butt and in one week in 1899 the quests of Arthur Francis Basset of Tehidy shot 703 birds on a Tuesday, 785 on the Wednesday and 1109 on the Thursday. The record for one day was 1600 birds.

Nance Wood was originally designated by the Nature Conservancy in 1951 under the National Parks and Access to the Countryside Act 1949 and renotified in 1984 under the Wildlife and Countryside Act 1981.

== Wildlife and ecology ==
Most of the woodland is almost pure sessile oak which was last coppiced in the first part of the 20th century. Being close to the coast has resulted in a low, wind-pruned canopy between 4 m and 6 m high. The shrub layer is mainly of hawthorn (Crataegus monogyna), hazel (Corylus avellana), and holly (Ilex aquifolium), while the ground flora consists of bluebell (Hyacinthoides non-scripta), bracken (Pteridium aquilinum), bramble (Rubus fruticosus) and honeysuckle (Lonicera periclymenum). Scattered stands of greater woodrush (Luzula sylvatica) is found on the steeper slopes. The southern arm has a more varied canopy with ash (Fraxinus excelsior), oak and sycamore (Acer pseudoplatanus) coppice with a few wych elm (Ulmus glabra). The shrub layer consists of blackthorn (Prunus spinosa) and hawthorn.

The SSSI has a good bryophyte flora with 21 species of liverwort and 81 moss species. Notable are Hookeria lucens which has a typical oceanic west coast distribution and two nationally rare species; Aloina ambigua and Pohlia rothii.

Irish spurge

Irish spurge was first found in Cornwall by E Q Marquand in the summer of 1883, and at a 1984 meeting of the Penzance Natural History and Antiquarian Society it was remarked on how unusual it was to add a new species of plant to the West Cornwall list. At that time the only other known site in Britain was at Combe Martin in Devon. It is a native plant, widespread in southern Ireland and extremely rare and local in Cornwall, Devon and Somerset. In Nance Wood it is found in the formerly coppiced oak woodland and on a Cornish hedge within the wood. Internationally the plant has a disjunct distribution and is part of the Lusitanian flora which are found only in south-west Ireland and northern Iberia. They are usually absent from other nearby regions. Irish Spurge is the only species of the Lusitanian flora which also occurs in south-west England.
