= Saihō-ji (Kyoto) =

Rinzai Zen Buddhist temple in Kyoto

- 西芳寺
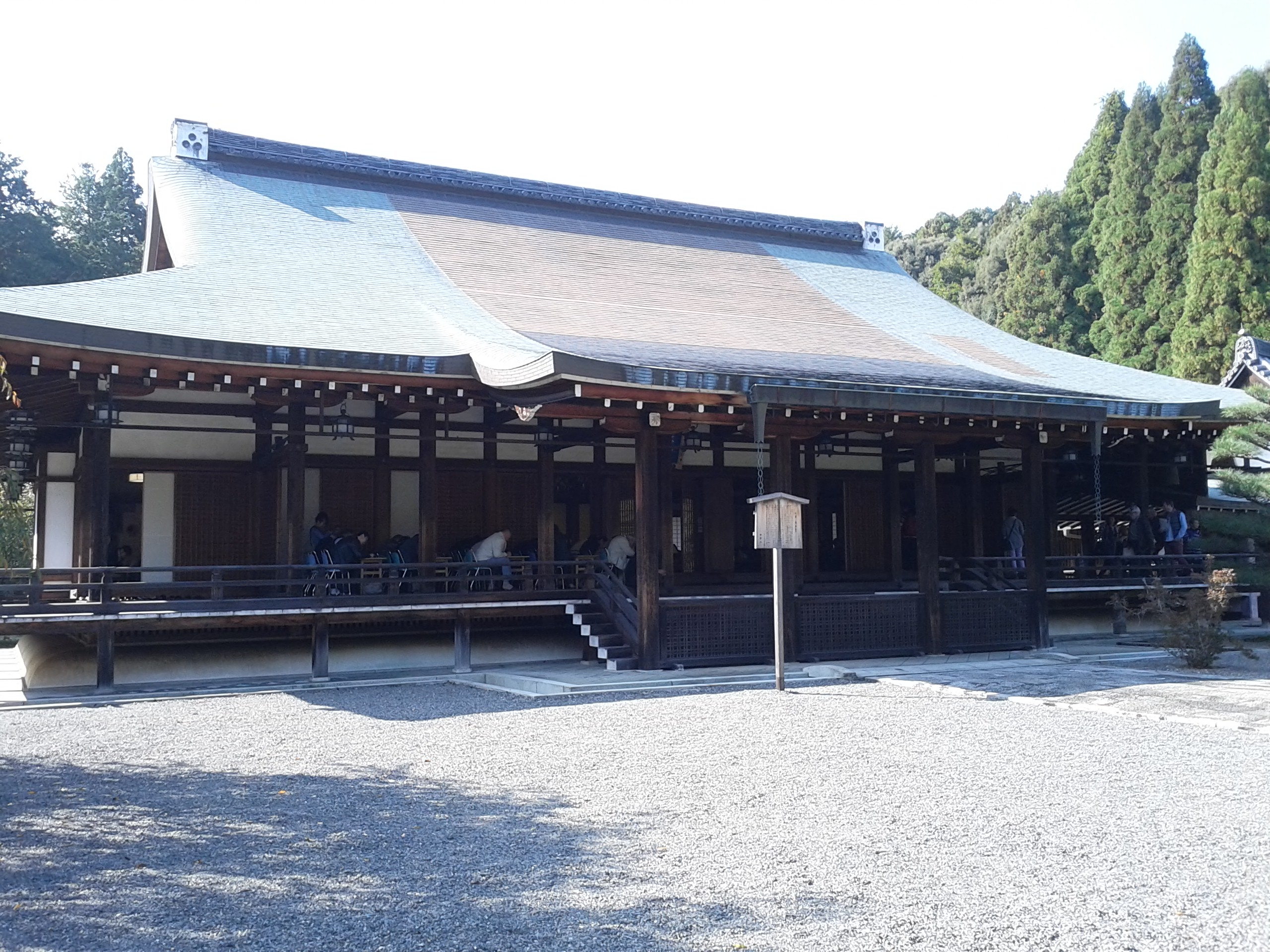
- Saihō-ji Hondō

- Saihō-ji Saihō-ji (Kyoto) (Japan)

Religion
- Affiliation: Buddhist
- Deity: Amida Nyorai (Amitābha)
- Rite: Independent Rinzai (formerly Tenryū-ji)

Location
- Location: 56 Matsuo Jingatani-chō, Ukyō-ku, Kyoto-shi, Kyoto-fu
- Country: Japan
- Coordinates: 34°59′33″N 135°41′03″E

Architecture
- Founder: Gyōki (acc. legend) (restored by Musō Soseki)
- Completed: c.731, 1339 (restored); 1969-1978 (reconstruction)
- UNESCO World Heritage Site
- Type: Cultural
- Criteria: (ii), (iv)
- Designated: 1994
- Reference no.: 688

Website
- Official website
- Important Cultural Property National Special Place of Scenic Beauty National Historic Site of Japan

Saihō-ji (西芳寺) is a Buddhist temple located in Matsuo, Nishikyō-ku, Kyoto, Japan. It belongs to the Rinzai school of Japanese Zen, and honzon is a statue of Amida Nyorai. The temple, which is famed for its moss garden, is commonly referred to as "Koke-dera" (苔寺), meaning "moss temple", while the formal name is "Kōinzan Saihō-ji" (洪隠山西芳寺). In 1994, Saihō-ji was registered as a UNESCO World Heritage Site, as part of the "Historic Monuments of Ancient Kyoto". Over 120 types of moss are present in the two-tiered garden, resembling a beautiful green carpet with many subtle shades. The gardens of Saihō-ji are designated as both a Special Place of Scenic Beauty and a National Historic Site.

== History ==
According to temple legend, Saihō-ji was constructed in 731 during the Nara period by Gyōki, on the location of one of Prince Shōtoku's former retreats, with a statue of the Amida Nyorai, carved by the prince, as its main image. The temple first operated as a Hossō temple dedicated to Amitabha, and was known as "Saihō-ji" (西方寺), a homophone of the current name. The name was selected because Amitabha is the primary buddha of Western Paradise, known in Japanese as "Saihō Jōdo" (西方浄土). In the early Heian period, in 806, Prince Shinnyo, son of Emperor Heizei, is said to have built a hermitage there for ascetic practice. Furthermore, Kūkai, the founder of the Shingon sect, is said to have performed a release of captive animals ceremony at the Golden Pond. During the Kamakura period, Nakahara Morokazu (ancestor of the Settsu clan), the governor of Settsu Province, restored the temple and later Honen converted it to the Jōdo-shū sect.

Over time, the temple fell into disrepair, and in 1339, the chief priest of the nearby Matsunoo Shrine, Fujiwara Chikahide, summoned the famous Japanese gardener Musō Soseki to help him revive Saihō-ji as a Zen temple. At this time, Musō decided to change the temple's name, to reflect its new Zen orientation. The temple became "Saihō-ji" (西芳寺), the name being selected not only because it was a homophone of the original name, but also because the kanji were used in phrases related to Bodhidharma: "Bodhidharma came from the West" (祖師西来, soshi seirai) and "Bodhidharma's teachings shall spread and come to bear fruit like a five-petaled flower" (五葉聯芳, goyō renpō). In 1342, Emperor Kōgon, the first emperor of the Northern Court, visited the temple accompanied by Ashikaga Takauji, the first shogun of the Muromachi shogunate.

Saihō-ji was destroyed by fire during the Ōnin War in 1469 when the Eastern Army's Hosokawa Katsumoto established his camp there. It was again damaged by a flood in 1485 and rebuilt by Rennyo of Hongan-ji. The temple was again rebuilt by the 8th Shogun, Ashikaga Yoshimasa, and Jishō-ji (Ginkaku-ji) was modeled after some of its elements. In 1568, during the Azuchi-Momoyama period, the temple was again destroyed by fire during a conflict led by the Yanagimoto clan of Tanba Province, but Oda Nobunaga ordered Sakugen Shūryō of Tenryū-ji to rebuild it. During the Edo period, the garden was devastated by floods twice, during the Kan'ei era (1624-1644) and the Genroku era (1688-1704). According to French historian François Berthier, the garden's "islands" were "carpeted with white sand" in the fourteenth century, as was thus a dry landscape garden. The moss came much later, apparently of its own accord during the Meiji period (1868–1912), when the monastery lacked sufficient funds for upkeep. Geographical factors, such as its location in a valley with a nearby river, are considered a major contributing factor.

In 1862, during the Bakumatsu period, the court noble Iwakura Tomomi temporarily lived in seclusion at the Shōnan-tei arbor at Saihō-ji With the Meiji restoration's anti-Buddhist movement, the temple grounds were reduced in size and fell into disrepair. It was restored in 1878, and the garden was opened to the public in 1928.

== Layout ==
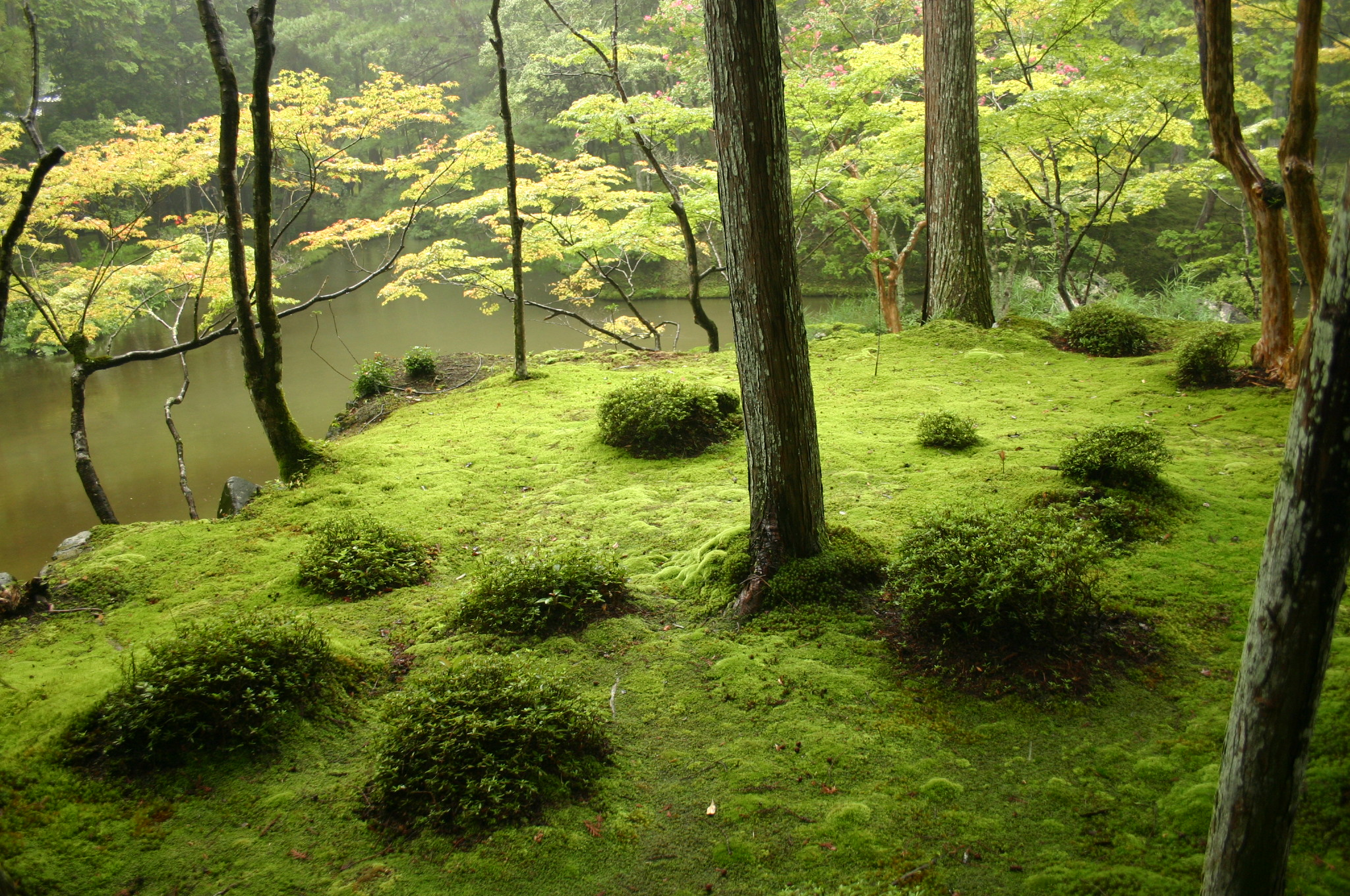
Moss garden of Saihō-ji, designated as a Special Place of Scenic Beauty and a Historic Site

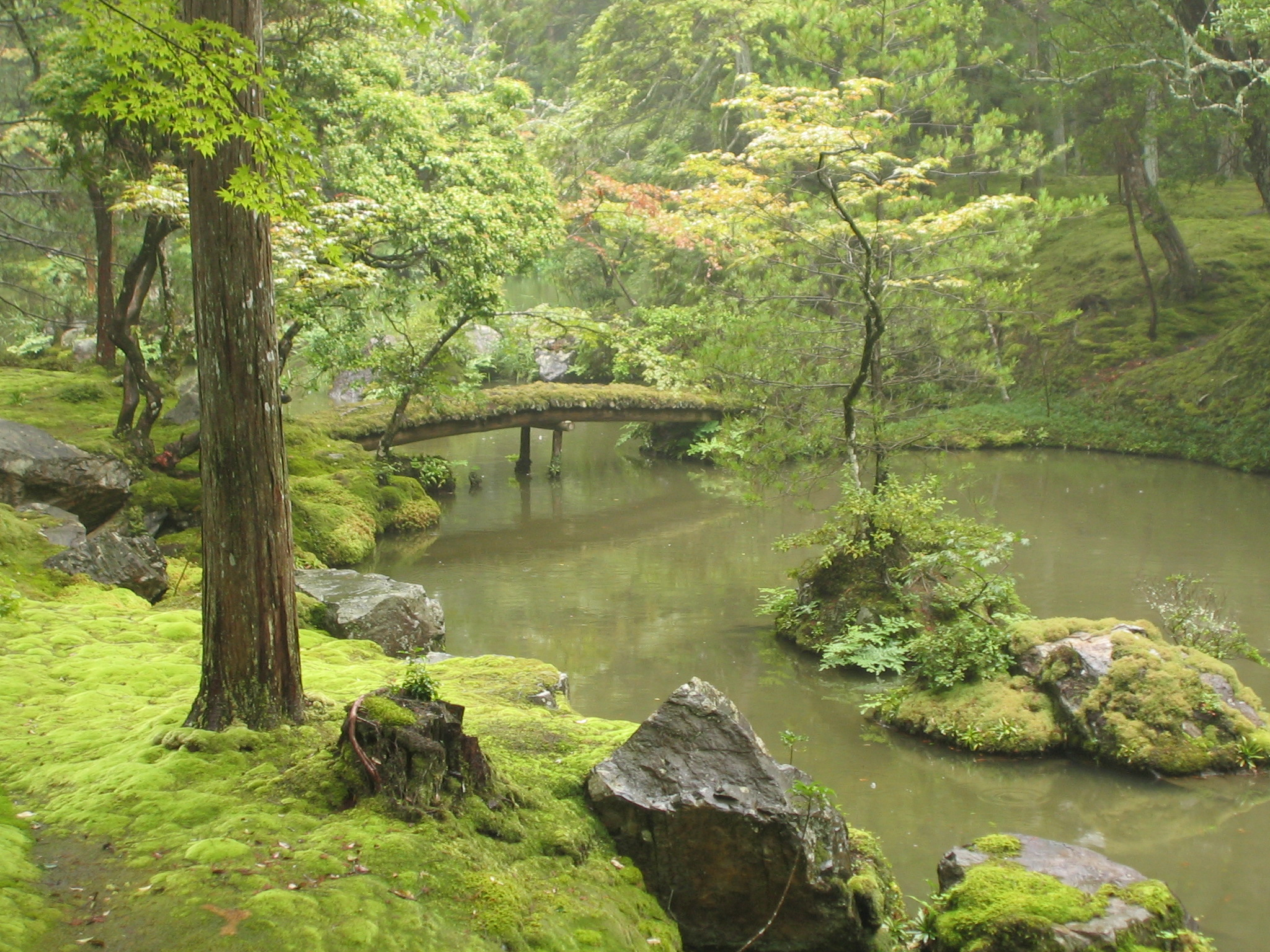
Golden Pond, in the center of the moss garden

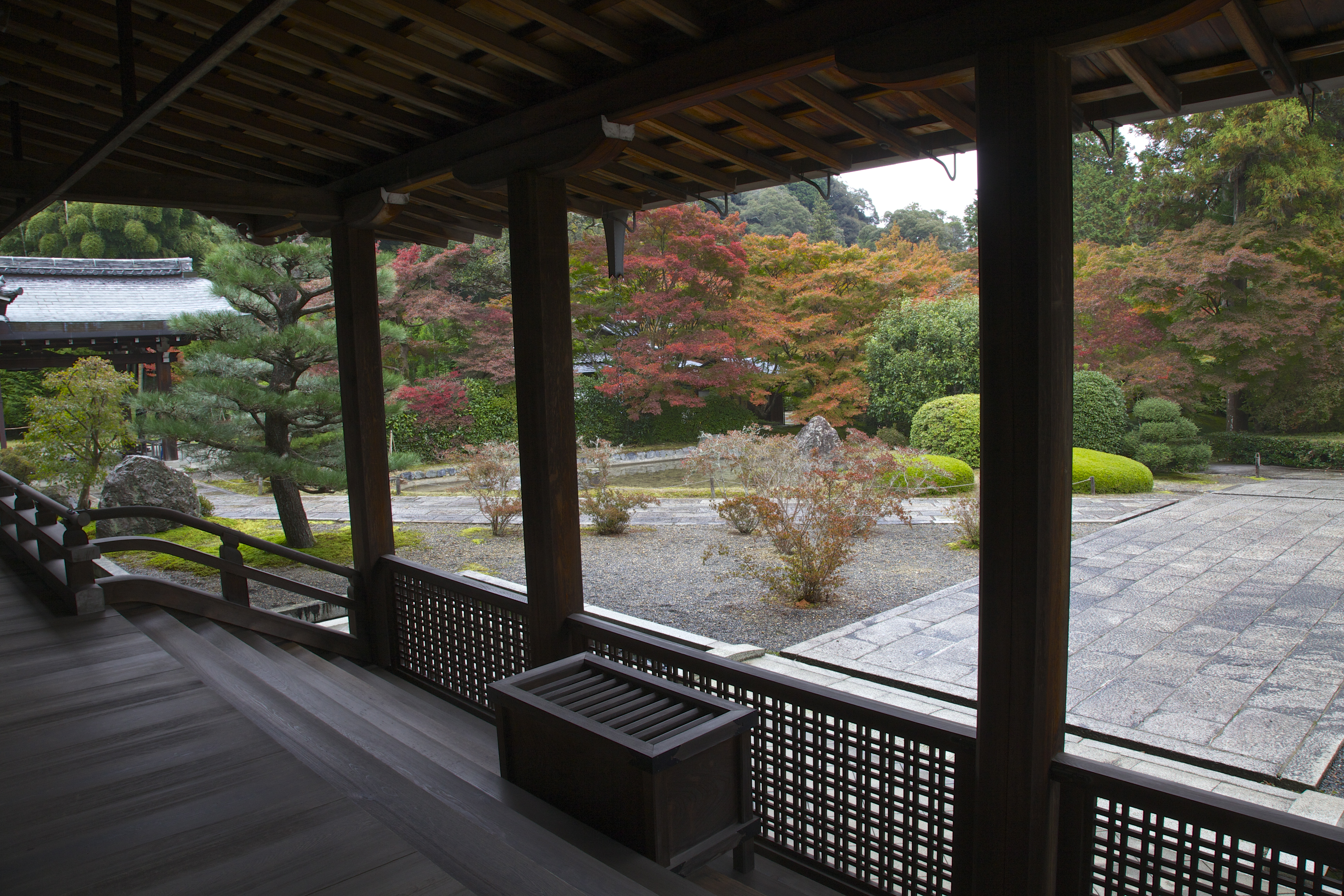

The famous moss garden of Saihō-ji is situated on the eastern temple grounds. Located in a grove, the garden is arranged as a circular promenade centered on Golden Pond (黄金池, ōgonchi). The pond is shaped like the Chinese character for "heart" or "mind" (心, kokoro) and contains three small islands: Asahi Island (朝日島), Yūhi Island (夕日島), and Kiri Island (霧島). The area around the pond is said to be covered with more than 120 varieties of moss, which is believed to have started growing after the flood of the temple grounds in the Edo Period.

The garden itself contains three tea houses: Shōnan-tei (湘南亭), Shōan-dō (少庵堂), and Tanhoku-tei (潭北亭), which were partially inspired by phrases from the Zen work Blue Cliff Record.

- Shōnan-tei was originally built during the 14th century, but was subsequently destroyed. It was later restored by Sen Shōan. Iwakura Tomomi was famously sheltered here towards the end of the Edo Period. Shōnan-tei is registered as a national Important Cultural Property.
- Shōan-dō was constructed in 1920, and contained a wooden image of Sen Shōan, after whom the teahouse was named.
- Tanhoku-tei was donated to the temple in 1928 by potter Zōroku Mashimizu.

The eastern temple grounds also contain the main temple hall, the study, and a three-storied pagoda.

- The main hall of the temple, known as Sairai-dō (西来堂), was reconstructed in 1969, and it was in this year that the current image of Amitabha was enshrined. The paintings on the sliding doors are the work of Inshō Dōmoto.
- The three-storied pagoda was erected in 1978, and is used to store copies of sutras, written by Rinzai adherents. The pagoda was constructed to honor Yakushi Nyorai.

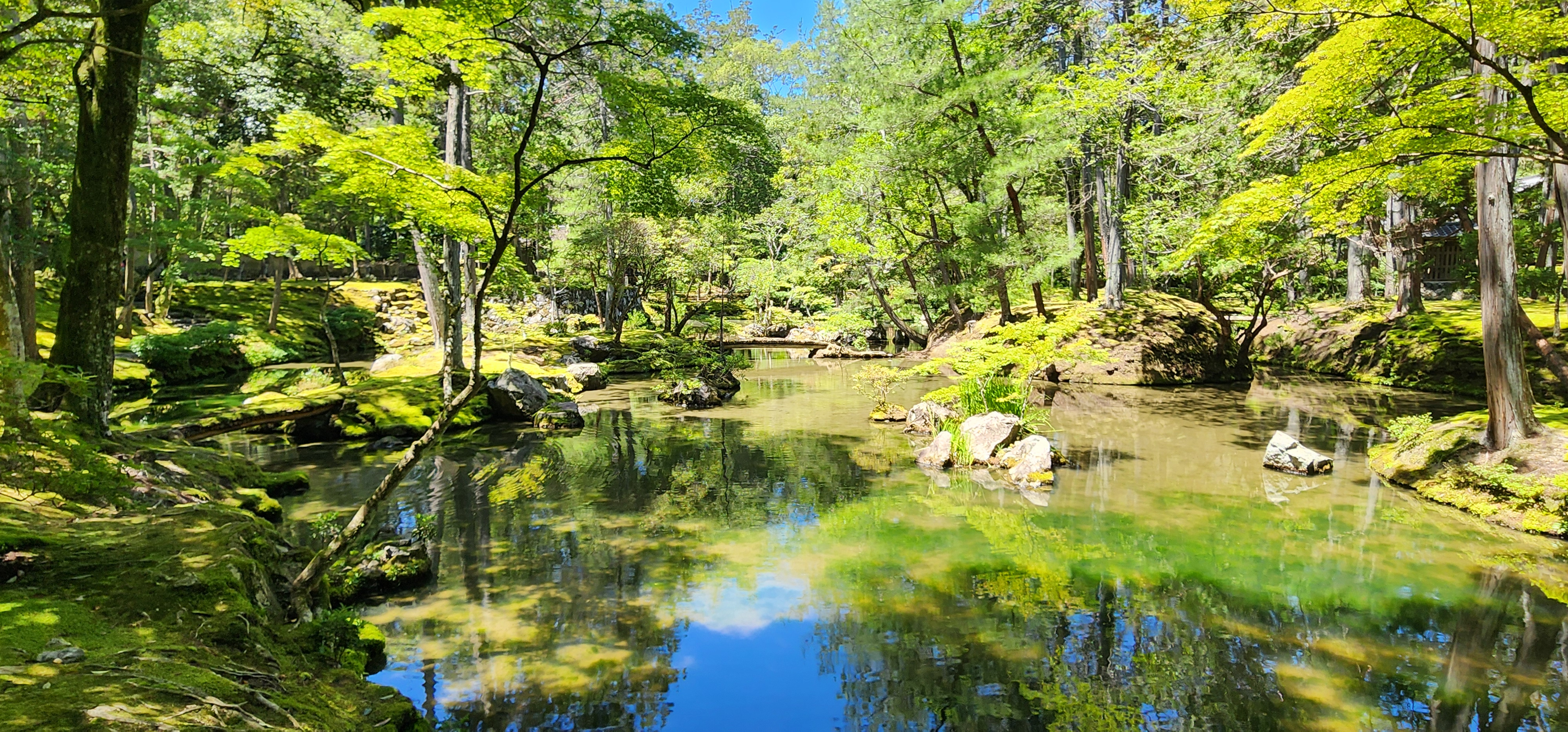
Another view of Golden Pond.

The northern temple grounds contain a Zen rock garden, and a temple hall known as Shitō-an (指東庵). The arrangement of stones in the rock garden is said to be demonstrative of Musō's creative genius.

Other significant items within the temple grounds include a stone monument engraved with a Kyoshi Takahama haiku, and another stone monument, engraved with some of the writings of Jirō Osaragi.

== Tourism ==
Until 1977, Saihō-ji was open to the general public on a walk-up basis, as with other temples. At present, while it is open to the public, a number requirement limits the number of visitors. It is said that these regulations were put into place to protect the delicate moss from the hordes of tourists that plagued the temple before 1977.

- Reservations are required by prior application, either by online application (additional ¥110 online payment fee occur) or by return postcard (international visitors send a postcard or letter with an international reply coupon).
- The fee to visit (¥4,000) is the highest in Kyoto.
- Visitors under the age of 30 can take part in an under-30-program with reduced entry fee (¥3,000).
- Before being permitted access to the garden, visitors must engage in an activity, which varies by the program chosen. These include zazen (sitting meditation), hand copying sutras, and chanting sutras. The regular admission program requires copying of a sutra with 49 kanji that is supposed to take approximately 15min to do. The sutras can either be taken home or left in the temple to be burnt as part of a fire offering.

The best time to visit is either during the East Asian rainy season (in Kyoto, early June to mid-July), when the rains make the moss particularly lush, or in late autumn, when the turning leaves contrast with the moss.

== Cultural properties ==
=== Important Cultural Properties ===
- Shōnan-tei (湘南亭), Azuchi-Momoyama period (1573-1614); South building, Waiting room and corridor
- Silk painted portrait of Musō Soseki (絹本著色夢窓疎石像)

== See also ==
- List of Special Places of Scenic Beauty, Special Historic Sites and Special Natural Monuments
- List of Historic Sites of Japan (Kyoto)
