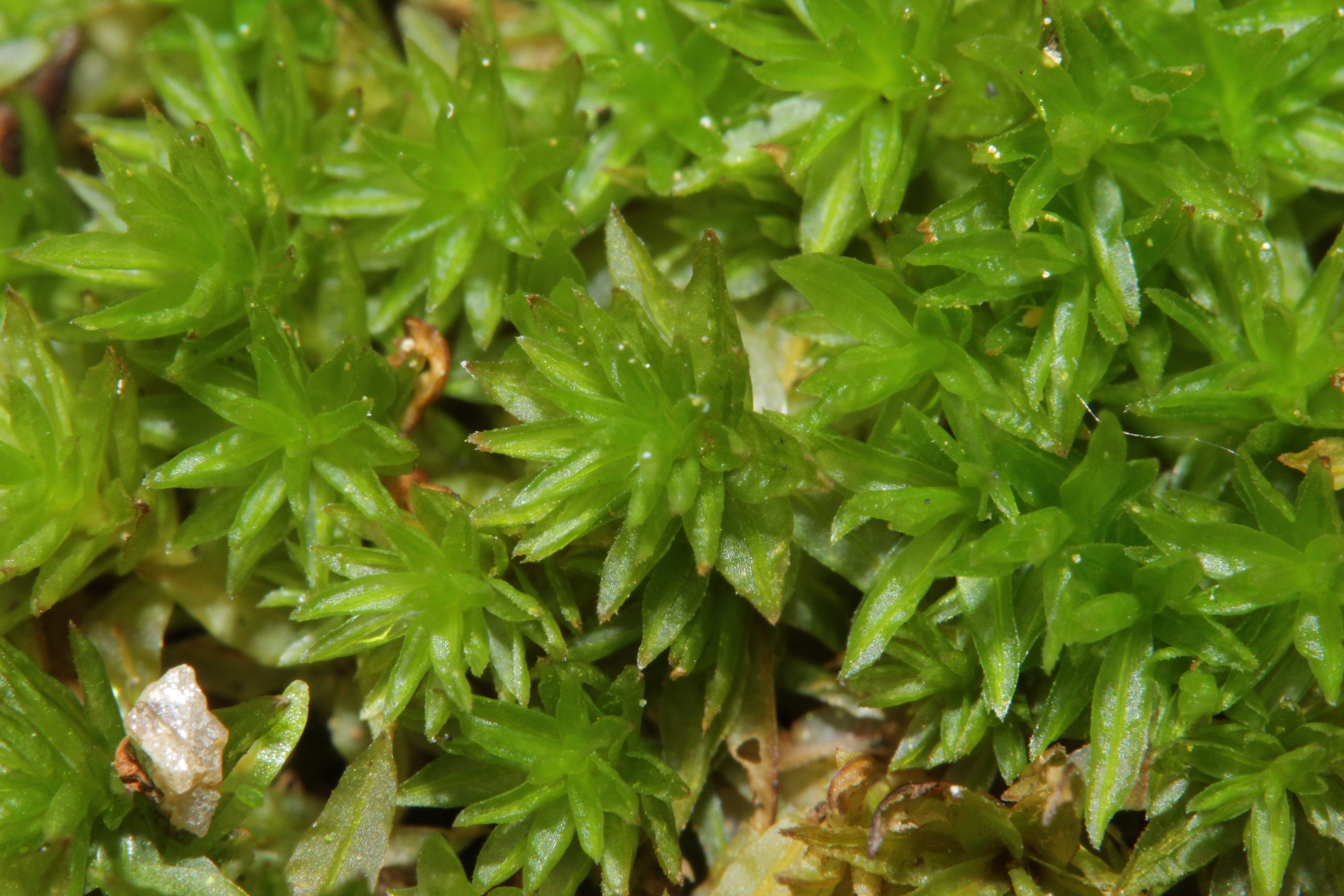

Scientific classification
- Kingdom: Plantae
- Division: Bryophyta
- Class: Polytrichopsida
- Order: Polytrichales
- Family: Polytrichaceae
- Genus: Atrichum
- Species: A. tenellum

Binomial name
- Atrichum tenellum (Rohl.) Br.Eur.

= Atrichum tenellum =

Species of moss

Atrichum tenellum, also known as the slender smoothcap, is a species of moss belonging to the family Polytrichaceae. It is red listed in Iceland as a critically endangered (CR) species. In Iceland, it is only found in two geothermal areas.

== Description ==
A. tenellum will form dull brown or green clumps. The species possesses 2cm tall shoots that are erect and unbranched. Leaves are 4.5-5.5mm long and scarcely undulate. The leaves are also narrowly egg-shaped and distinctively narrowed towards the base. They also possess paired marginal teeth down to the mid-leaf.

== Habitat ==
A. tenellum is an uncommon species, which can be found in a range of disturbed, acidic and open habitats. A tenellum grows on moist soils such a loam or sandy humus. This species can be found growing in woodland habitats where it inhabits rides, but also in ditches and even open heathlands and grasslands. Populations can also be found on the banks of streams, lakes and reservoirs where the soil is moist.
