= Atrichum crispum =

Scientific classification
- Kingdom: Plantae
- Division: Bryophyta
- Class: Polytrichopsida
- Order: Polytrichales
- Family: Polytrichaceae
- Genus: Atrichum
- Species: A. crispum

Binomial name
- Atrichum crispum (James) Sull.

Species of moss

Atrichum crispum is a species of moss. It is dioicous with males being the same size as females or larger.

== Common names ==
The following is a list of common names the species goes by:

- Crispy smoothcap moss
- Strongly crisped smoothcaped moss
- Wave-leaved crane’s-bill moss
- Fountain smoothcap
- Atrichum moss
- Oval starburst moss

== Distribution and habitat ==
The species has a disjunct distribution where it occurs in Europe and eastern parts of North America. In Europe only male plants have been discovered.

It occurs in eight regions of Estonia with it first being found in Estonia during 2004.

=== North America ===
It is frequent in the Atlantic coastal plain but also occurs in the mountains.

It is native to five counties in Florida.

=== British Isles ===
It is thought that the species was introduced to the British Isles from North America.

British bryologist John Nowell was the first to find the species in Britain in 1848 near Rochdale, and it was first found in Ireland during 1957.
