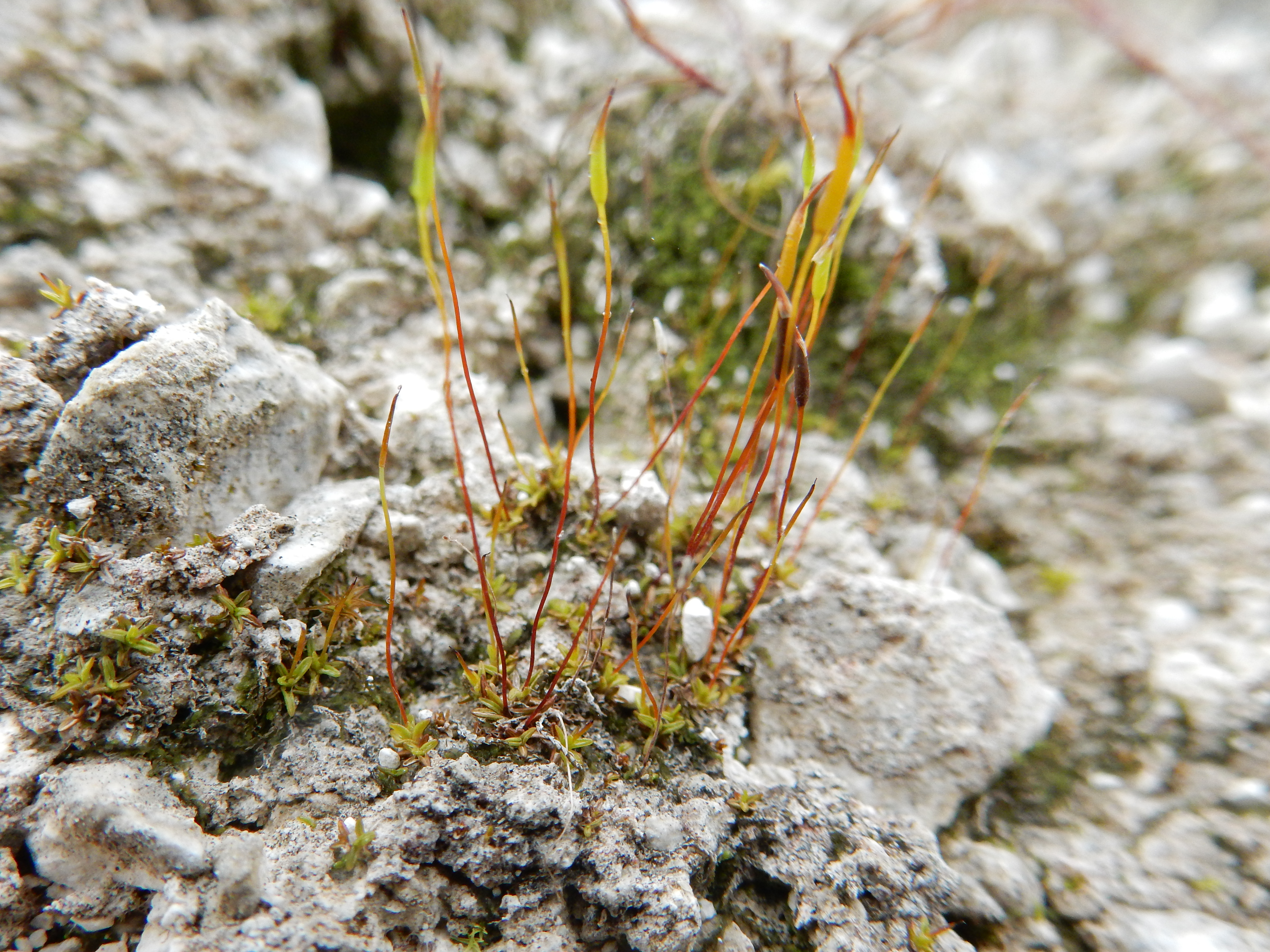
- Aloina rigida

Scientific classification
- Kingdom: Plantae
- Division: Bryophyta
- Class: Bryopsida
- Subclass: Dicranidae
- Order: Pottiales
- Family: Pottiaceae
- Genus: Aloina; Kindb.

= Aloina =

Genus of mosses

Aloina is a genus of mosses belonging to the family Pottiaceae first described by Nils Conrad Kindberg. It has a cosmopolitan distribution.

== Species ==
The following species are recognised in the genus Aloina:

- Aloina aloides (Koch ex Schultz) Kindb.
- Aloina ambigua (Bruch & Schimp.) Limpr.
- Aloina apiculata (E.B. Bartram) Delgad.
- Aloina bifrons (De Not.) Delgad.
- Aloina brevirostris (Hook. & Grev.) Kindb.
- Aloina calceolifolia (Spruce ex Mitt.) Broth.
- Aloina catillum (Müll. Hal.) Broth.
- Aloina cornifolia Delgad.
- Aloina hamulus (Müll. Hal.) Broth.
- Aloina humilis M. T. Gallego, Cano & Ros
- Aloina macrorrhyncha (Kindb.) Kindb.
- Aloina recurvipatula (Müll. Hal.) Broth.
- Aloina rigida (Hedw.) Limpr.
- Aloina roseae (R.S. Williams) Delgad.
- Aloina sedifolia (Müll. Hal.) Broth.
- Aloina sullivaniana(Müll. Hal.) Broth.
