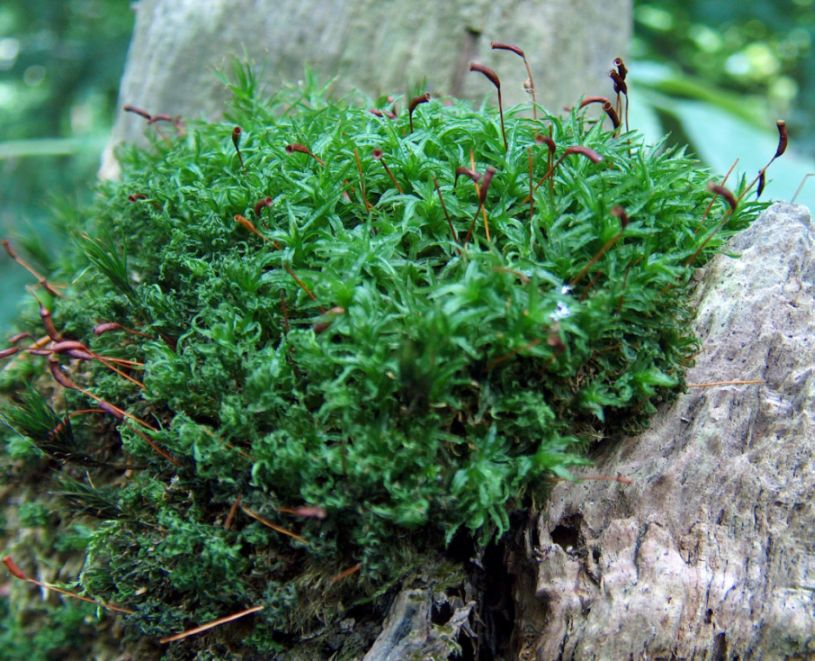

Scientific classification
- Kingdom: Plantae
- Division: Bryophyta
- Class: Polytrichopsida
- Order: Polytrichales
- Family: Polytrichaceae
- Genus: Atrichum
- Species: A. undulatum

Binomial name
- Atrichum undulatum (Hedw.) P. Beauv.

= Atrichum undulatum =

Species of moss

Atrichum undulatum is a species of mosses belonging to the family Polytrichaceae.

It is native to Eurasia and North America.
