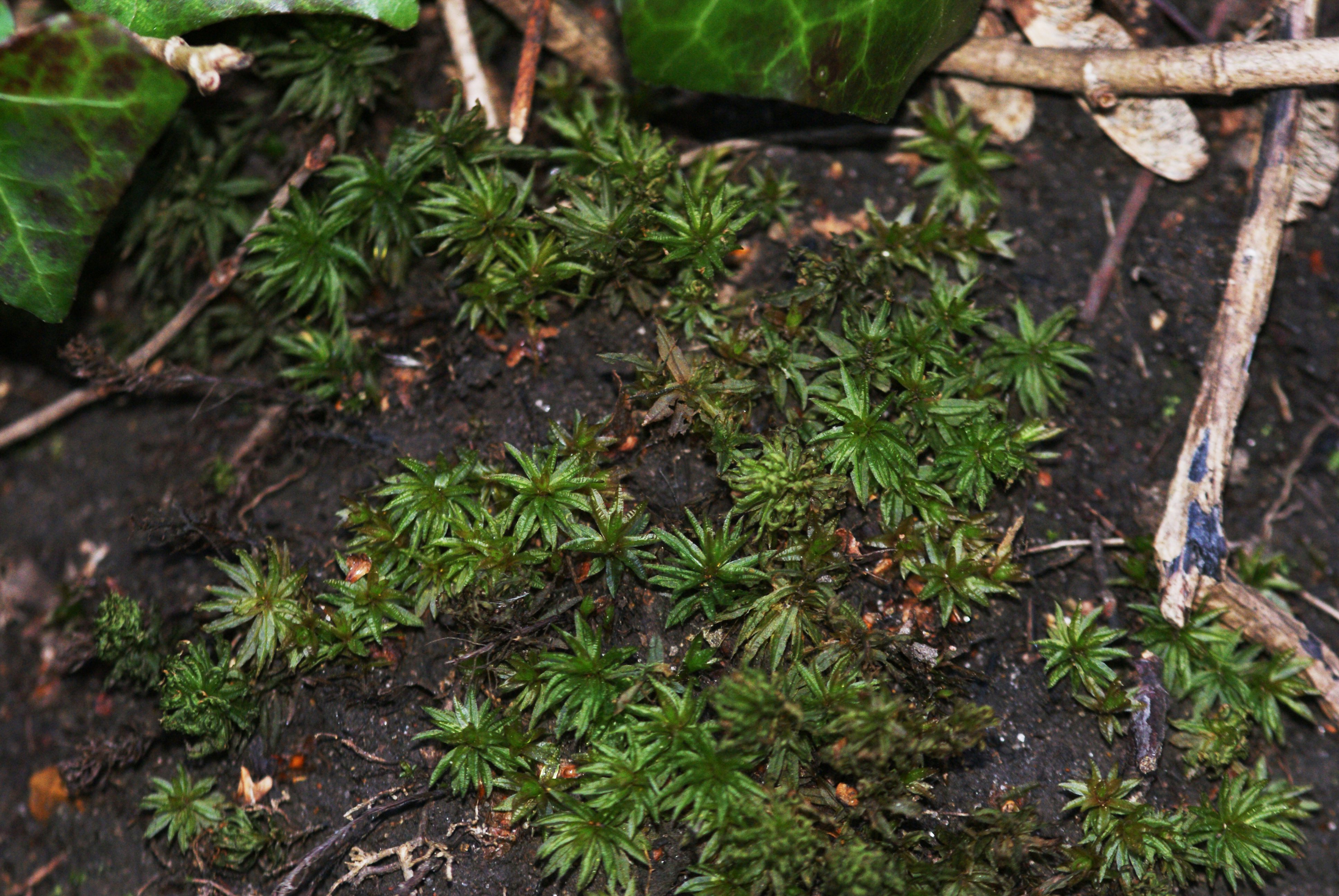
- Atrichum undulatum

Scientific classification
- Kingdom: Plantae
- Division: Bryophyta
- Class: Polytrichopsida
- Order: Polytrichales
- Family: Polytrichaceae
- Genus: Atrichum; P.Beauv.

= Atrichum =

Genus of mosses

Atrichum is a genus of mosses belonging to the family Polytrichaceae.

The genus was first described by Palisot de Beauvois.

The genus has cosmopolitan distribution.

Species:

- Atrichum angustatum
- Atrichum crispum
- Atrichum flavisetum
- Atrichum tenellum
- Atrichum undulatum
