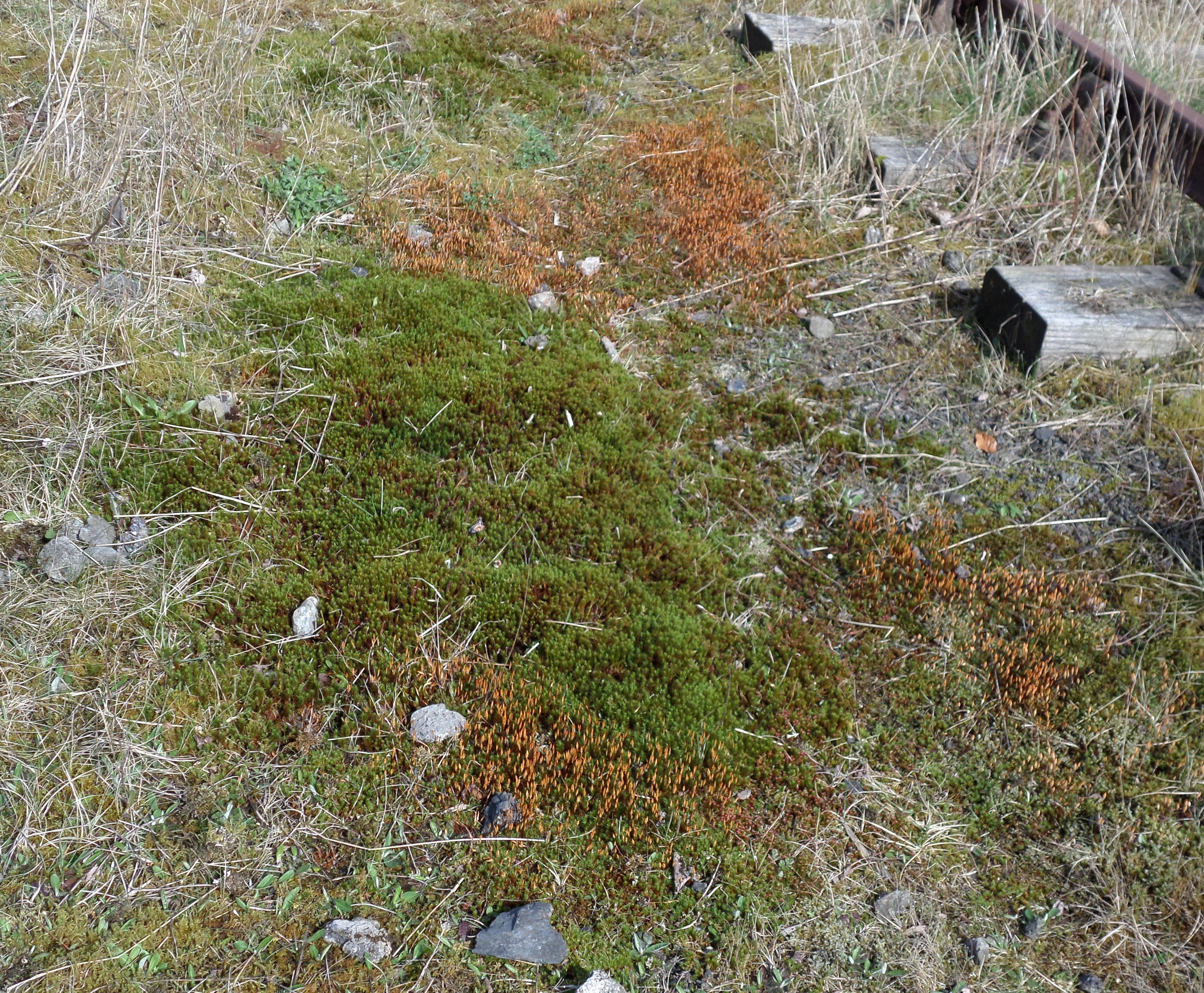

Scientific classification
- Kingdom: Plantae
- Division: Bryophyta
- Class: Polytrichopsida
- Order: Polytrichales
- Family: Polytrichaceae
- Genus: Atrichum
- Species: A. angustatum

Binomial name
- Atrichum angustatum (Brid.) Bruch & Schimp.

= Atrichum angustatum =

Species of moss

Atrichum angustatum, commonly known as slender starburst moss, is a species of mosses belonging to the family Polytrichaceae.

It is native to Eurasia and Northern America. It is rare in Iceland, being found at only two locations; there, it is locally listed as a vulnerable species (VU).

== Description ==
Atrichum angustatum is a small and green to reddish brown colored moss. It has separate female and male plants, with male plants being equal to or smaller than the female plants. The leaves are concave, elongated, narrow and taper to a point, and evenly distributed on a 1-2 cm long stem. Individual leaves are between 4-8 mm long and 0.4-0.8 mm wide.

== Distribution and Habitat ==
Atrichum angustatum is located in parts of North America and Europe. Its habitats include locations such as grasslands and woodlands. It can be found on exposed roadside soil, near the roots of living trees and around the roots of fallen trees. It prefers semi-acidic soil with a pH of 6.0 and 6.5 in addition to clay and sand filled soil. In addition it prefers damp ground, which might be due to long-term shade or soil that holds water. In some locations, such as Britain, it was classified as a critically endangered species, before eventually being rediscovered.
