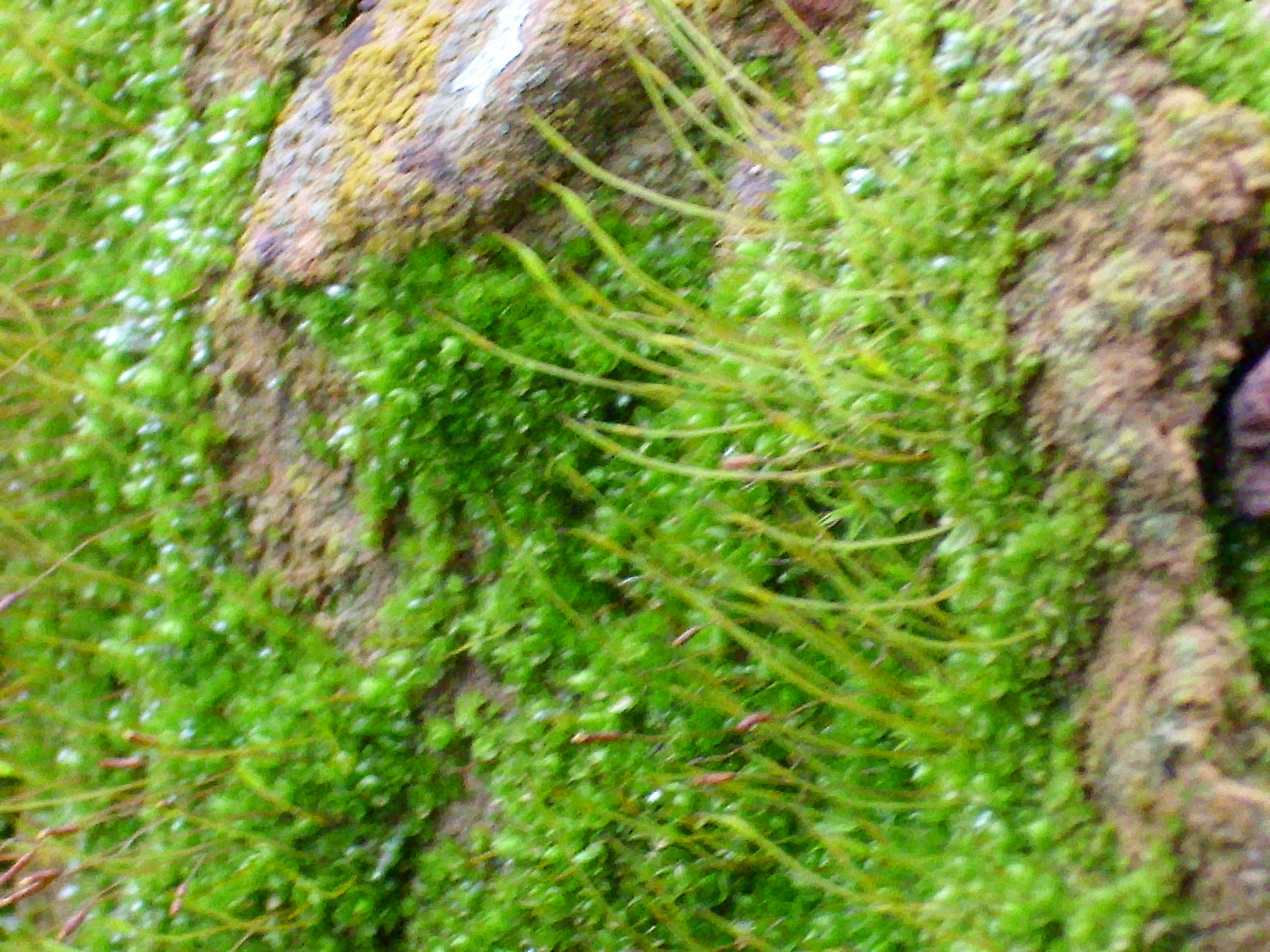

Scientific classification
- Kingdom: Plantae
- Division: Bryophyta
- Class: Bryopsida
- Subclass: Dicranidae
- Order: Pottiales
- Family: Pottiaceae
- Genus: Aloina
- Species: A. aloides

Binomial name
- Aloina aloides (Koch ex Schultz) Kindb.

= Aloina aloides =

Species of moss

Aloina aloides is a species of moss belonging to the family Pottiaceae. It has a cosmopolitan distribution.
