= List of Bryum species =

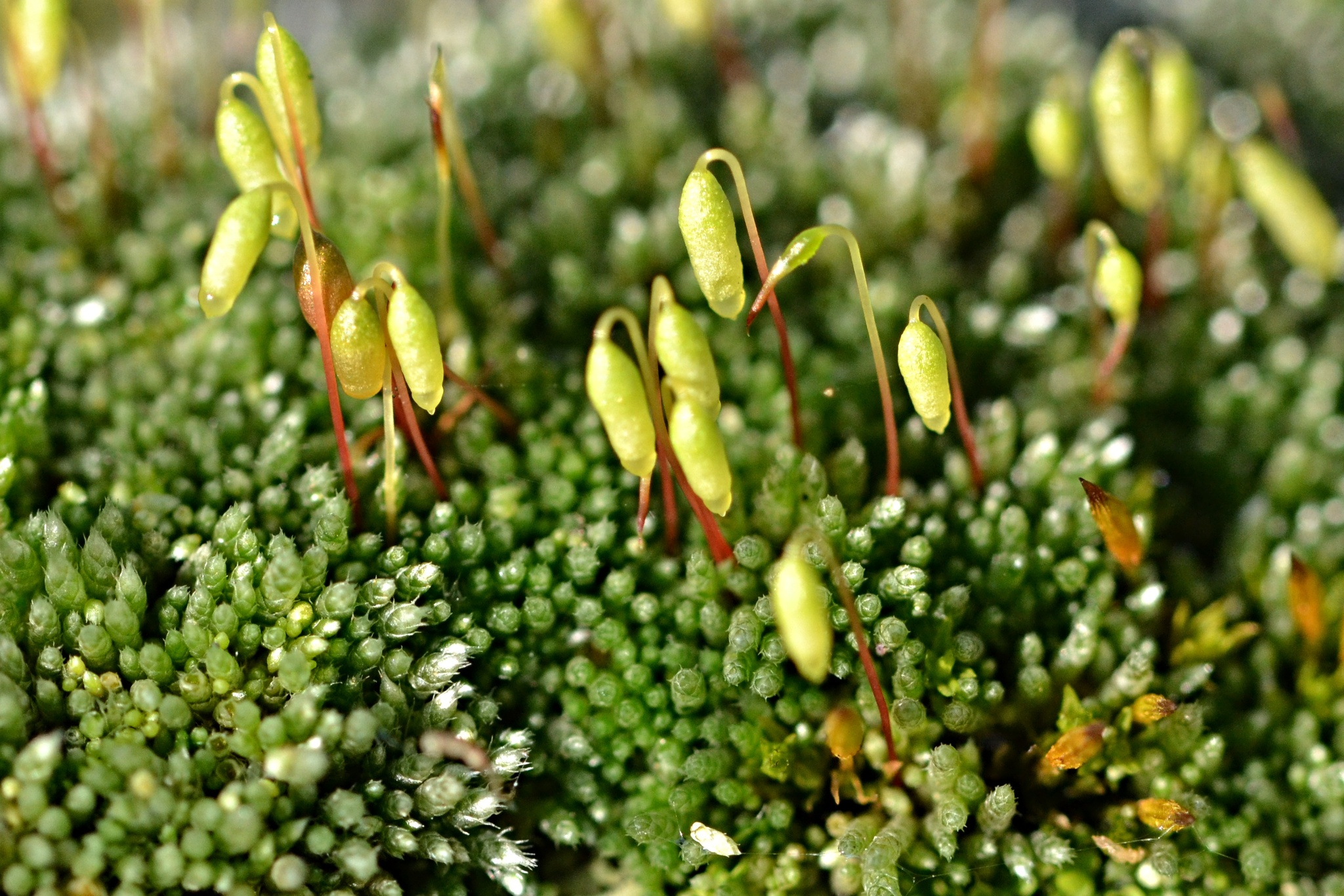
Bryum argenteum

Over 1,000 species were accepted in the moss genus Bryum until it was split into three genera in a 2005 publication. As of December 2024, the genus has 263 accepted species, 232 synonyms, and 5 unplaced.

== List ==
=== A ===
Bryum acuminatissimum - Bryum acutifolium - Bryum afrocalophyllum - Bryum alandense - Bryum albopulvinatum - Bryum albulum - Bryum altaicum - Bryum amblyacis - Bryum amentirameum - Bryum anomodon - Bryum apalodictyoides - Bryum arachnoideum - Bryum argenteum - Bryum argentisetum - Bryum atrovirens - Bryum auratum - Bryum austroturbinatum

=== B ===
Bryum baeuerlenii - Bryum bavaricum - Bryum bharatiense - Bryum billetii - Bryum blindii - Bryum borellii - Bryum botterii - Bryum bourgeauanum - Bryum brachycladulum - Bryum brevicoma - Bryum brotherianum - Bryum bulbiferum - Bryum bulbigerum - Bryum bullosum

=== C ===
Bryum cadetii - Bryum calobryoides - Bryum campoanum - Bryum campylopodioides - Bryum capillatum - Bryum capituliforme - Bryum carbonicola - Bryum challaense - Bryum cognatum - Bryum colombi - Bryum coloradense - Bryum conoideo-operculatum - Bryum crassimucronatum - Bryum cremocarpum - Bryum crozetense

=== D ===
Bryum deciduum - Bryum defractum - Bryum delitescens - Bryum denticulatinervium - Bryum depressum - Bryum diaphanum - Bryum dimorphum - Bryum dissolutinerve - Bryum dixonii - Bryum dongolense - Bryum dyffrynense

=== E ===
Bryum ekmanii - Bryum elegantulum - Bryum ellipticifolium - Bryum elwendicum - Bryum encalyptaceum - Bryum erythrotropis - Bryum euryphyllum - Bryum evanidinerve

=== F ===
Bryum fabronia - Bryum falcatum - Bryum felipponei - Bryum flaccidifolium - Bryum flagellans - Bryum flagellicoma - Bryum flavipes - Bryum formosum - Bryum funckiioides - Bryum fuscescens - Bryum fuscomucronatum - Bryum fuscotomentosum

=== G ===
Bryum gamophyllum - Bryum garovaglioi - Bryum gemmatum - Bryum gemmiparum - Bryum germainii - Bryum gilliesii - Bryum gjaidsteinense - Bryum glacierum - Bryum gracilisetum - Bryum gynostomoides - Bryum gyoerffyanum

=== H ===
Bryum haematoneuron - Bryum hatcheri - Bryum hauthalii - Bryum hedbergii - Bryum hioramii

=== I ===
Bryum illecebraria - Bryum imbricatum - Bryum innovans - Bryum insolitum

=== J ===
Bryum jamaicense - Bryum joannis-meyeri

=== K ===
Bryum kashmirense - Bryum kikuyuense

=== L ===
Bryum lamii - Bryum lamprostegum - Bryum lanatum - Bryum latilimbatum - Bryum leonii - Bryum lepidum - Bryum leptocaulon - Bryum leptoglyphodon - Bryum leptospeiron - Bryum leptotorquescens - Bryum leptotrichum - Bryum leucoglyphodon - Bryum leucophylloides - Bryum liliputanum - Bryum limbifolium - Bryum lingulanum - Bryum lonchophyllum - Bryum lonchopus - Bryum lorentzii - Bryum ludovicae

=== M ===
Bryum macroblastum - Bryum macrodictyum - Bryum mairei - Bryum megalacrion - Bryum mendax - Bryum mesodon - Bryum microcapillare - Bryum microcochleare - Bryum microimbricatum - Bryum micronitidum - Bryum mieheanum - Bryum minusculum - Bryum minutirosatum - Bryum minutissimum - Bryum mirabile - Bryum miserum - Bryum mollifolium - Bryum molliusculum - Bryum mucronifolium - Bryum multiflorum

=== N ===
Bryum nanocapillare - Bryum nanophyllum - Bryum neelgheriense

=== O ===
Bryum oamaruanum - Bryum obliquum - Bryum oblongum - Bryum obscurum - Bryum ochianum - Bryum oedeneuron - Bryum oophyllum - Bryum orthocladum - Bryum orthodontioides - Bryum osculatianum - Bryum oxycarpum

=== P ===
Bryum pabstianum - Bryum pallidoviride - Bryum pamirense - Bryum pamiricomucronatum - Bryum pancheri - Bryum papuanum - Bryum patzeltii - Bryum pedemontanum - Bryum peralatum - Bryum perdecurrens - Bryum perminutum - Bryum perrieri - Bryum petelotii - Bryum phallus - Bryum platense - Bryum platyphyllum - Bryum pocsii - Bryum posthumum - Bryum procerum - Bryum prosatherum - Bryum pseudoblandum - Bryum pseudocastaneum - Bryum pseudomicron - Bryum pseudopachytheca - Bryum pungentifolium - Bryum purpuratum - Bryum purpureolucidum - Bryum purpureonigrum - Bryum pycnodictyum - Bryum pygmaeomucronatum - Bryum pygmaeum - Bryum pyrrhothrix

=== R ===
Bryum rapaense - Bryum rectifolium - Bryum recurvulum - Bryum redboonii - Bryum remelei - Bryum retusifolium - Bryum reyeri - Bryum rhexodon - Bryum rhizoblastum - Bryum rhypariocaulon - Bryum riparioides - Bryum riparium - Bryum rivale - Bryum roscheri - Bryum rosulans - Bryum rosulans - Bryum rubescens - Bryum rubicundum - Bryum rubrocostatum - Bryum rubrolimbatum - Bryum rudimentale - Bryum rufolimbatum - Bryum rufolimbatum - Bryum runmaroeense - Bryum russulum

=== S ===
Bryum sabuletorum - Bryum salakense - Bryum sandei - Bryum savesii - Bryum savondroninicum - Bryum sclerodictyon - Bryum semirubrum - Bryum serpillifolium - Bryum sinense - Bryum sinuosum - Bryum skottsbergii - Bryum soboliferum - Bryum sordidum - Bryum spinifolium - Bryum spinosum - Bryum splachnobryoides - Bryum splendidifolium - Bryum srilankenese - Bryum stellituber - Bryum stenophyllum - Bryum subargenteum - Bryum subclavatum - Bryum subgracillimum - Bryum subleucophyllum - Bryum subpercurrente - Bryum subprostatum - Bryum subrotundifolium - Bryum svihlae

=== T ===
Bryum taimyrense - Bryum taitae - Bryum taoense - Bryum tenerum - Bryum tenuidens - Bryum tepintzensa - Bryum terskeiense - Bryum thomeanum - Bryum tisserantii - Bryum tjiburrumense - Bryum torquatum

=== U ===
Bryum uvidum

=== V ===
Bryum vernum - Bryum veronense - Bryum viguieri - Bryum voeltzkowii - Bryum vulcanicum

=== W ===
Bryum wagneri - Bryum wallaceanum
