= Rhodobryum huillense =

Scientific classification
- Kingdom: Plantae
- Division: Bryophyta
- Class: Bryopsida
- Subclass: Bryidae
- Order: Bryales
- Family: Bryaceae
- Genus: Rhodobryum
- Species: R. huillense

Binomial name
- Rhodobryum huillense (Welw. & Duby) A.Touw

Species of moss

Rhodobryum huillense is a species of moss belonging to the family Bryaceae.

A study in tropical Ecuador found that Rhodobryum huillense was typically not found in urban environments despite being found in nearby pristine location, suggesting that the species is sensitive to anthropogenic effects such as the presence of wastewater and heavy metal pollution.
