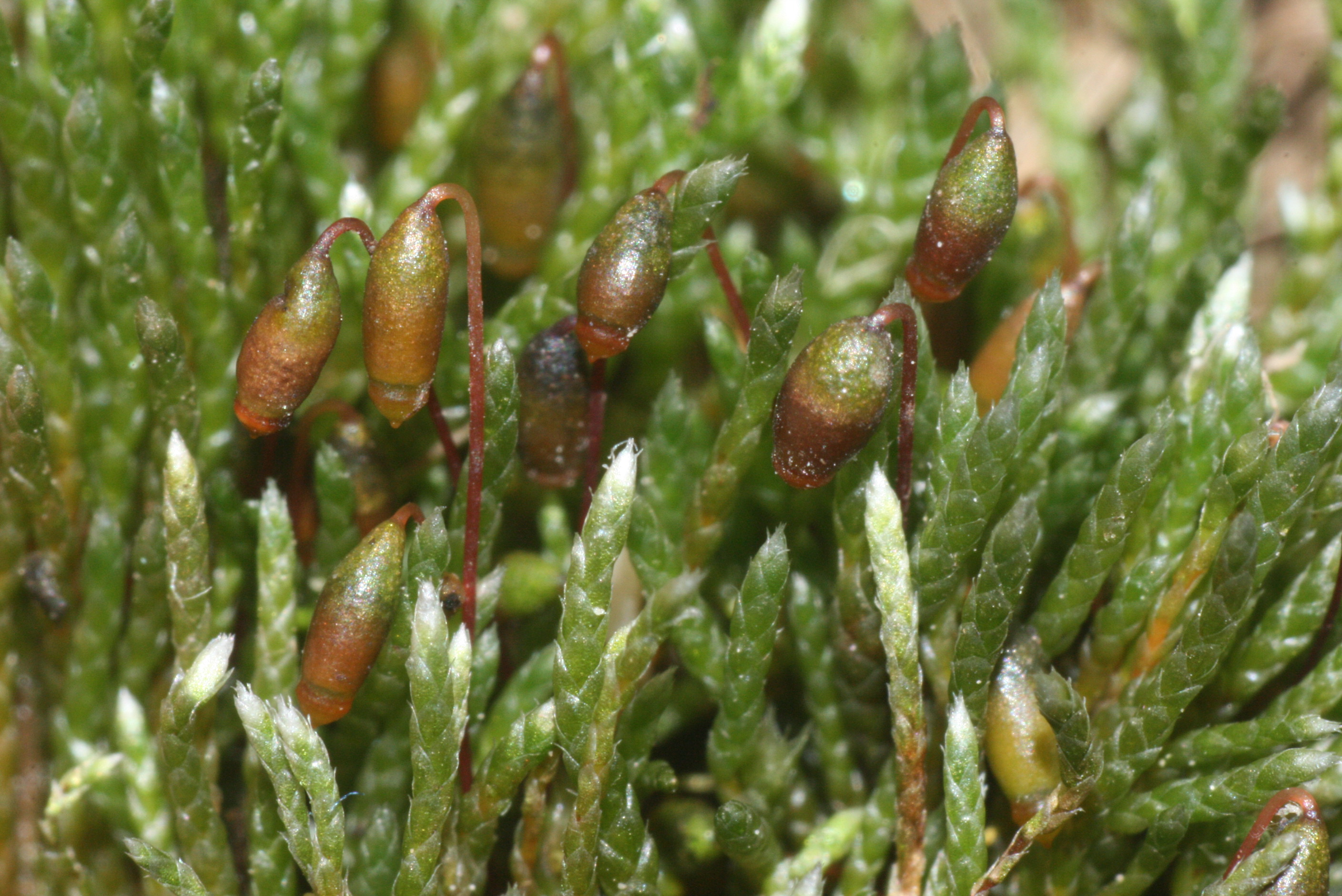

Scientific classification
- Kingdom: Plantae
- Division: Bryophyta
- Class: Bryopsida
- Subclass: Bryidae
- Order: Bryales
- Family: Bryaceae
- Genus: Bryum
- Species: B. argenteum

Binomial name
- Bryum argenteum Hedw.

= Bryum argenteum =

Silvergreen bryum moss

Species of moss

Bryum argenteum (common names: silver moss, silver-green moss, silvery thread moss) is a species of moss in the family Bryaceae. It is one of the most widely recognised mosses in the world and one of the most common in urban environments, identifiable without a microscope by its characteristic silvery-white sheen when dry. The species name comes from the Latin argenteum, meaning silver.

== Description ==
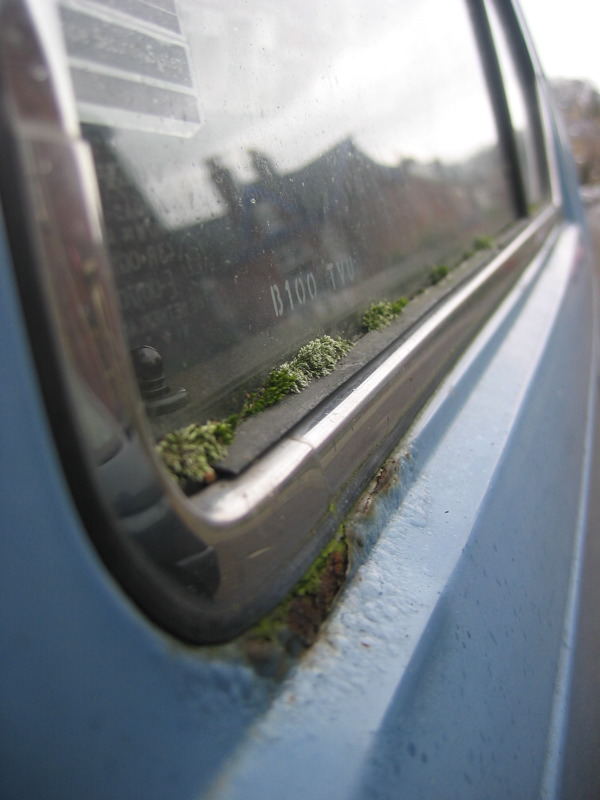
B. argenteum growing in the cracks of a car window

B. argenteum is silvery-green or whitish-green colored when dry. This is because the broadly ovate-shaped single leaflets in the tip do not form chlorophyll. Shoots are typically less than 1 cm tall, with rounded, concave leaves 0.75–1.25 mm long that give each shoot a smoothly cylindrical profile. The upper cells of the leaf surface are elongated rhomboid-shaped. The leaf nerve terminates well below the leaf apex. The capsule of the sporophyte is short cylindrical, appears broader at the base and is dark red to black colour.

=== Morphology ===
The following formal treatment is based on Ohlsen (2022) via VicFlora:

Stems branching by innovations, julaceous, 5–15 mm long, pale green, orange or pink, sparsely covered with pale brown rhizoids toward base. Leaves closely imbricate when moist or dry, ovate to ovate-lanceolate, 0.5–1.5 mm long, c. 0.4 mm wide, concave; apex acute or obtuse; costa weak, percurrent or ending in apical half of leaf; margin entire or rarely denticulate at apex, plane, without a border; laminal cells in apical half rhomboidal-hexagonal, 40–70 μm long, 12–15 μm wide, hyaline in apical 1/4–1/2; basal laminal cells short-rectangular or quadrate. Seta 12–20 mm long, red. Capsules pendent, ovate, 0.85–2 mm long. Operculum convex, apiculate.

=== Leaf structure and the silver effect ===
Each leaf of B. argenteum comprises two structurally and functionally distinct zones. The lower portion contains chloroplasts and is photosynthetically active, while the upper (distal) portion is entirely chloroplast-free, forming a colourless, transparent zone known as the hyaline region. This hyaline region functions as a structural screen against intense solar radiation, a trait of particular adaptive significance in high-radiation environments such as desert surfaces and polar exposures.

When shoots are fully hydrated and turgid, the photosynthetically active lower cells are prominent, and the hyaline tips are inconspicuous. As shoots desiccate and compact, the transparent upper cells become the most visible surface feature, scattering and reflecting incident light to produce the distinctive silvery-white appearance for which the species is named.

=== Morphological response to environment ===
Research conducted in Tibet's arid and semi-arid regions found that the physical form of B. argenteum varies with substrate type. In soil-dwelling (terricolous) populations, shoot and leaf dimensions were most strongly associated with growing-season precipitation, soil pH, and soil texture. In rock-dwelling (saxicolous) populations, morphological traits responded primarily to elevation, growing-season temperature, total annual precipitation, and soil nutrient parameters, including total nitrogen, available phosphorus, and organic matter content. Across both substrate types, morphological traits did not respond independently but shifted as integrated suites, suggesting a coordinated phenotypic response to environmental variation.

== Ecology ==
=== Desiccation and heat tolerance ===
B. argenteum is an acrocarpous moss, meaning it grows upright, forming dense, sparsely branched clumps. It is notable for its tolerance of extreme environmental conditions. B. argenteum is considered a desiccation-tolerant species that can withstand total drying and was one of the first bryophytes experimentally determined to have this capacity. Desiccated shoots have been documented to survive brief exposures to temperatures as high as 120°C, and photosynthetic recovery can occur rapidly following the cessation of heat and radiation stress.

=== Habitat ===
B. argenteum is widespread and frequently abundant in disturbed, nutrient-enriched (particularly nitrate-rich) substrates subject to periodic desiccation. It thrives in areas of high human activity, growing on rocks, in gaps of paving stones, on asphalt, roadsides, walls, rooftops, concrete, and tarmac, and grows especially well in inner cities and industrial areas. Being a nitrogen-loving species, it is also found on nitrophilic soils in urban areas and among lawns.

In less disturbed settings, the species also occurs in woodland, on sand dunes, along eroding stream and river banks, in rocky gorges, in alpine herbfields, and on unstable lowland cliff faces.

The species is often spread by vegetative fragments clinging to the shoes of people and the feet or hooves of animals. It is also commonly spread through the production and sale of plant liners, which may carry B. argenteum, often in association with Marchantia polymorpha, transported across regions before being planted at foreign locations.

== Reproduction ==
B. argenteum maintains a dioicous reproductive system, in which male and female gametophytes occur as separate, morphologically distinct plants. Sexual reproduction requires spatial proximity between individuals of both sexes, as swimming male gametes (antherozoids) must travel through a continuous surface film of water from the antheridia of the male plant to the archegonium, the female reproductive organ, where fertilisation of the egg occurs. The resulting zygote develops into the sporophyte, from which spores are produced and released. Spores are minute and lightweight, and dispersal is primarily wind-mediated.

Asexual reproduction also occurs through the production of bulbils and protonema gemmae, small vegetative propagules that detach from the parent shoot and establish as genetically identical clones. This mode of reproduction is particularly significant in populations where males are absent or where abiotic conditions are insufficient for fertilisation.

=== Sex ratios ===
Natural populations consistently exhibit female-biased sex ratios, with males underrepresented relative to the 1:1 ratio expected from meiotic spore production. Environmental conditions, including light exposure and temperature, influence sex expression, and laboratory-reared cohorts more closely approach equal sex ratios.

The female bias in field populations is attributed to differential survival costs between sexes. Male plants allocate considerable resources to antherozoid production prior to any fertilisation event, a cost that reduces resources available for vegetative growth and survival. Female plants incur reproductive costs only when fertilisation is successful and sporophyte development proceeds. In environments where conditions for fertilisation are rarely met, many female plants avoid reproductive investment entirely and consequently survive at higher rates.

== Similar species ==
While several Bryum species share a similar compact, julaceous shoot architecture, the silver colouration of B. argenteum when dry is diagnostic and not replicated in closely related taxa. The following species may cause confusion in the field:

- Anomobryum julaceum — yellowish-green rather than silvery grey; favours streamside habitats.
- Plagiobryum zieri — tinged pink or red; typically occurs at higher elevations on rocks and cliff faces.
- Bryum lanatum — distinguished by a strong nerve and a fine hair-point at the leaf apex.
- Bryum dichotomum — green forms of B. argenteum growing on wet, nutrient-enriched tarmac can resemble this species; both may also bear bulbils in the leaf axils.
- Stegonia latifolia — also silvery but substantially smaller (approximately 2 mm tall) and holds its elliptical capsules erect rather than pendulous.
