= Bryum dixonii =

Dixon's thread-moss

Scientific classification
- Kingdom: Plantae
- Division: Bryophyta
- Class: Bryopsida
- Subclass: Bryidae
- Order: Bryales
- Family: Bryaceae
- Genus: Bryum
- Species: B. dixonii

Binomial name
- Bryum dixonii Cardot ex W.E.Nicholson

Species of moss

Bryum dixonii, commonly known as Dixon's threadmoss, is a moss endemic to Scotland. The species occupies montane habitats, and although rare it has a wide distribution including the central and north-west Highlands, and the islands of Skye, Rùm and St Kilda. Originally discovered on Ben Narnain, Argyll, in 1898 by Hugh N. Dixon, it was not seen again until 1964 when found by Ursula Duncan at Juanjorge in Glen Clova in Angus. As of 2000 there was no species action plan for its protection.
