= Bryum bharatiense =

Scientific classification
- Kingdom: Plantae
- Division: Bryophyta
- Class: Bryopsida
- Subclass: Bryidae
- Order: Bryales
- Family: Bryaceae
- Genus: Bryum
- Species: B. bharatiense

Binomial name
- Bryum bharatiense W.U.Rehman, K.Gupta & Bast

Species of moss

Bryum bharatiense is a species of moss in the family Bryaceae. It was named after Bharati, an Indian research in Antarctica (which in turn takes its name from the Hindu goddess, Bharati).

== Discovery and habitat ==
Bryum bharatiense was collected during the 36th Indian Scientific Expedition to Antarctica in 2016 to 2017. The specimen was collected in the Larsemann Hills region of East Antarctica, including nearby localities on Fisher Island and the McLeod Islands.

The moss grew in areas associated with penguin breeding rookeries. Penguin guano was suggested as a source of nitrogen in the nutrient poor Antarctic environment.

== Description ==
Bryum bharatiense has an unbranched growth form and reaches approximately 1.5-3cm in height. Its stems are dark green near the base and brown towards the upper portion. The leaves are ovate at the base and become lanceolate towards the apex, with slightly serrated margins near the tip. The leaf cells are elongared and narrow in outer regions, becoming rhomboidal to rectangular nearer the costa. The species also has sparsely distributed, smooth, branched rhizoids.

== Taxonomy ==
The taxonomic status of Bryum bharatiense was investigated using morphological comparisons and molecular phylogenetic analysis. Bryum pseudotriquetrum was identified as the closest match to its DNA sequence, with a 96.88% pairwise sequence identity.

In a maximum likelihood phylogenetic analysis of the internal transcribed spacer 1 (ITS1) region, the sequence attributed to B. bharatiense formed a basal branch relative to the other sampled Bryum species. The relatively long branch was interpreted by researchers as evidence of genetic divergence from the sampled species.

These findings were presented as support for the recognition of B. bharatienseas a distinct species in 2021.

== See also ==
- Wildlife of Antarctica
