= Bryum blindii =

Scientific classification
- Kingdom: Plantae
- Division: Bryophyta
- Class: Bryopsida
- Subclass: Bryidae
- Order: Bryales
- Family: Bryaceae
- Genus: Bryum
- Species: B. blindii

Binomial name
- Bryum blindii Bruch & Schimp.

Species of moss

Bryum blindii, commonly known as Blind's bryum moss, is a species of moss belonging to the family Bryaceae.

== Taxonomy ==
=== Synonyms ===
- Bryum arenarium Saut.
