= Osculatia =

Osculatia may refer:

- a genus of mosses, when it is possibly the correct name for the genus Gemmabryum
- a formerly recognized genus of birds used for the sapphire quail-dove
