= Rose moss =

Rose moss is a common name of several plants and may refer to:

- Portulaca grandiflora, a flowering plant cultivated in gardens
- Rhodobryum roseum, a moss with a wide native distribution
