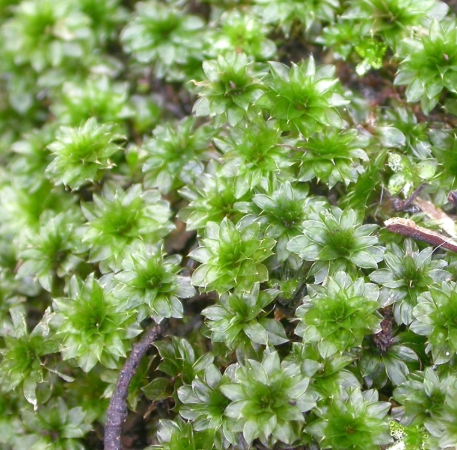

Scientific classification
- Kingdom: Plantae
- Division: Bryophyta
- Class: Bryopsida
- Subclass: Bryidae
- Order: Bryales
- Family: Bryaceae
- Genus: Rosulabryum
- Species: R. billardierei

Binomial name
- Rosulabryum billardierei (Schwägr.) J.R.Spence

= Rosulabryum billardierei =

Species of moss

Rosulabryum billardierei is a medium-sized moss species that was previously classified as Bryum billardierei before being reassigned to the genus Rosulabryum. The specific epithet has been subject to spelling variation with billardierei, billarderi, and billarderii all considered acceptable forms in literature.

== Description ==
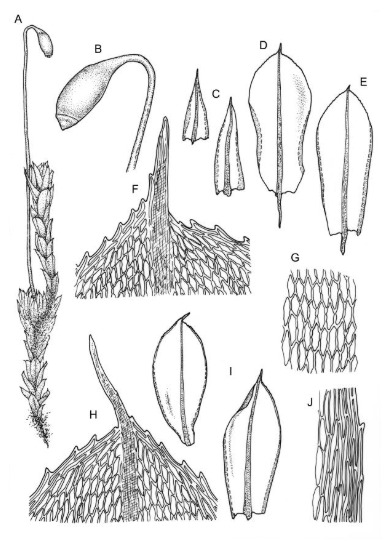
Diagram of Rosulabryum billardierei anatomy

Rosulabryum billardierei is a medium-sized moss species, bright green to yellow-green in colour, that grows loosely or densely in tufts or forms turves. The stems are red-brown with brown tomentum at the base, and plants reach 10–60 mm in height. Rhizoids are brown to reddish-brown and densely papillose. Leaves are erect to widely spreading when moist and distinctly rosulate, characteristic of the genus. They are ovate, oblong, or obovate, measuring 1.5–5(–6) mm long and 1–1.8(–2.5) mm wide. Leaf margins are toothed above and strongly recurved along the basal three-quarters, with a narrow border 1–3 cells wide that is not hyaline and lacks secondary pigmentation. Upper laminal cells are hexagonal to rhombic, while basal cells are broadly rectangular. The costa is strong and pale brown, excurrent, typically forming a 120–200 µm cusp. When dry, the leaves become contorted and twisted around the apex. Perichaetia are terminal and enclose a single fruit. The setae are straight, red, and 20–30 mm long. Capsules are pendent to horizontal, oval to cylindrical or oblong-cylindrical in shape, with a distinct neck 3–6 mm long. The operculum is mammillate, the exostome teeth are yellow-brown, and spores measure 11–18 µm in diameter.

Rosulabryum billardierei can be confused with the closely related Rosulabryum subtomentosum, which instead has spathulate leaves with a broader and often hyaline boarder (4 or more cells wide) and setae that are usually hooked at the base of the capsules.

== Habitat and range ==
Rosulabryum billardierei is a circum-temperate to subtropical species distributed throughout the Southern Hemisphere, including Africa, Australasia, Malesia, Oceania, and New Zealand. However, its precise range depends on taxonomic interpretation, with some authors extending its distribution to parts of the Northern Hemisphere. In Australia, the species is widely distributed across all states and territories except the Northern Territory. It occurs in a range of habitats, including woodlands, wet sclerophyll forest, rainforest, coastal vegetation, and along stream margins, from near sea level to approximately 400 m elevation, particularly in shaded environments. The species grows on a variety of substrates, including soil, rock, wood, and sand.

== Reproduction ==
Rosulabryum billardierei is dioicous, reproducing both sexually and asexually. Sexual reproduction relies on a stalked sporophyte growing after fertilisation occurs, as occurs in the majority of mosses. Asexual reproduction occurs through the production of gemmae in the form of rhizoidal tubers. These tubers are globose to oval in shape, measuring (300–) 500–1000 µm along the widest axis and are typically orange to red in colour.

== Etymology ==
The genus Rosulabryum is derived from a combination of Latin and Greek. The latin 'rosula' (a little rose), and the Greek 'bryon' (moss). The name refers to the distinctive rosette-like cluster of leaves that is characteristic of mosses in this genus. Billardierei is derived from the name of the French botanist J.J.H. de Labillardière who it was named in honour of.
