= Philotanus =

1719 poem by Jean-Baptiste Willart de Grécourt

Philotanus is a poem written around 1719 by Jean-Baptiste Willart de Grécourt and first published in 1720 in Paris, France. It was written in response to the passage of the Papal bull Unigenitus in 1713, which banned Jansenist teachings. Its Latin translation is attributed to Abbé Denis Bizot.

== Plot ==
The poem begins with the narrator finding a sleeping demon on the side of the road while on a walk. It wakes after being bound with a cordon blessed in the name of Francis of Assisi, and after being threatened with holy water by the narrator, agrees to answer their questions regarding the passage of Unigenitus.

== Reception ==
In 1722, the Archbishop of Bougres excommunicated those who read the poem, and in July of the same year, those who made the woodcuts and distributed copies were fined and exiled for three years after a trial held in Paris.

The author Nicolas Jouin wrote a sequel in 1733 titled Le Porte-Feuille du Diable, ou le Suite de Philotanus which elaborates on the conspiracy and names Beelzebub and Astarot as having also been involved in the passage of Unigentus. These two poems would often be published together in multiple books from then on.
