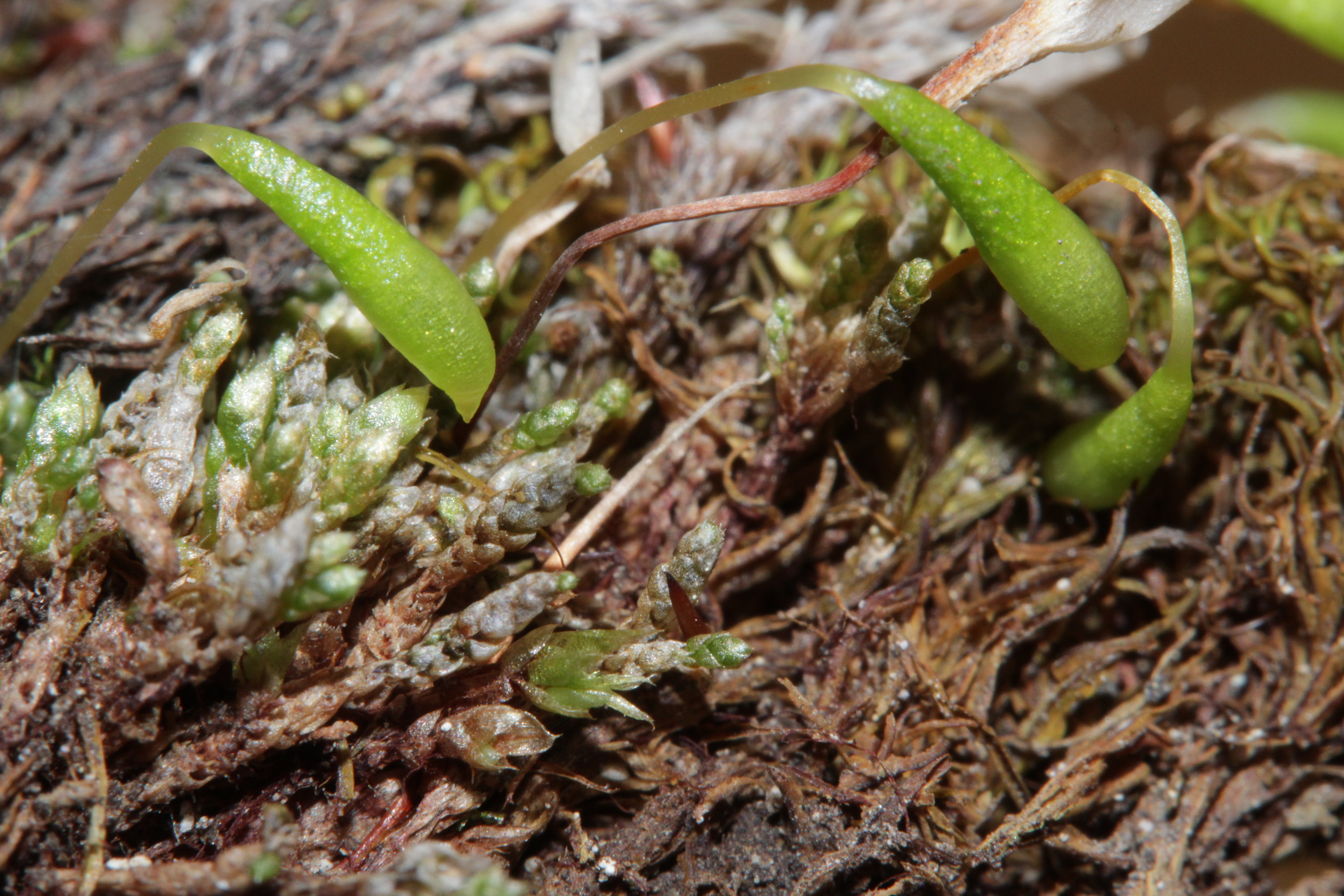

Scientific classification
- Kingdom: Plantae
- Division: Bryophyta
- Class: Bryopsida
- Subclass: Bryidae
- Order: Bryales
- Family: Bryaceae
- Genus: Plagiobryum; Lindb.

= Plagiobryum =

Genus of mosses

Plagiobryum is a genus of mosses belonging to the family Bryaceae. It has a cosmopolitan distribution.

== Species ==
The following species are recognised in the genus Plagiobryum:

- Plagiobryum demissum (Hook.) Lindb.
- Plagiobryum duthiei Hedderson & Harold, 1990
- Plagiobryum giraldii Paris, 1897
- Plagiobryum hultenii Hedderson, 1990
- Plagiobryum japonicum Noguchi, 1952
- Plagiobryum laxum Demaret & Potier de la Varde, 1944
- Plagiobryum novaeseelandiae Brotherus, 1916
- Plagiobryum piliferum Potier de la Varde, 1955
- Plagiobryum zierii (Dicks. ex Hedw.) Lindb.
