= Gemmabryum dichotomum =

Scientific classification
- Kingdom: Plantae
- Division: Bryophyta
- Class: Bryopsida
- Subclass: Bryidae
- Order: Bryales
- Family: Bryaceae
- Genus: Gemmabryum
- Species: G. dichotomum

Binomial name
- Gemmabryum dichotomum (Hedw.) J.R. Spence & H.P. Ramsay

Synonyms
- Bryum dichotomum Hedw.; Bryum urbanskyi Broth.

Species of moss

Gemmabryum dichotomum is a species of moss belonging to the family Bryaceae.

It is distributed throughout temperate regions of both hemispheres, as well as in Antarctic tundra.
