= Jean-Baptiste Willart de Grécourt =

French poet and writer (1684–1743)

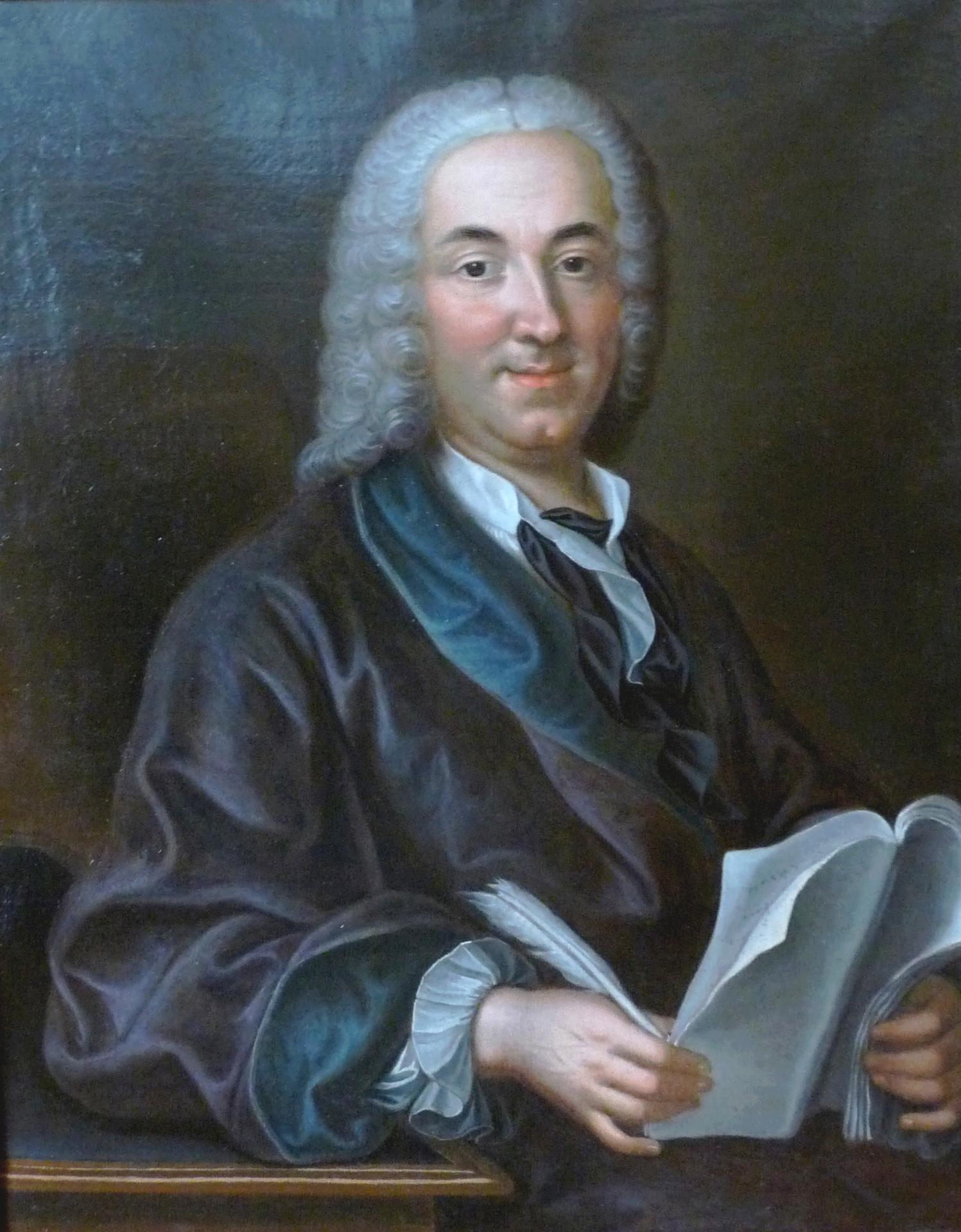
Portrait of Jean-Baptiste Joseph Willart de Grécourt (Tours, 1684- Tours, 1743).

Jean-Baptiste - Joseph Willart de Grécourt was a French ecclesiastic and poet born on February 7, 1684, in Vallières (now Fondettes) and died at Tours on April 2, 1743.

== Biography ==
Grécourt came from a family of Scottish origin, one noble but without fortune. He was the son of Jean Baptiste Willart, lord of Grécourt, advisor to the king, who was appointed grenetier of the salt granary of Tours in August 1673, and Anne Orceau of the Orceau family. When Willart died, Anne had to take a job as a post office manager in Tours to provide for her family. Grécourt himself studied in Paris under the direction of his ecclesiastical uncle, Germaine Willart, whose credit got him the title of canon of Saint-Martin de Tours in 1697, when he was 13 or 14 years old. A relative of his named M. Rouillé resigned from the position so that Grécourt could take it.

Once ordained a priest, Grécourt had great success through his talents as a preacher, but only preached sermons attacking the ladies of the city which caused a scandal, resulting in him being banned from speaking at the cathedral. His temperament led him more towards poetry and pleasures. Brilliant positions were offered to him, which he always refused, declining for example the offers of John Law, who wanted to attach him and to whom he responded with an apologue in verse, Le Solitaire et la fortune.

While remaining a canon, he renounced ecclesiastical life and spent a lot of time in Paris, where he became friends with Marshal d'Estrées and other young libertines. He ended up settling down in the capital where he was a regular among the freest and most gallant companies. Epicurean, lover of pretty women and good food, he composed many licentious tales and poems, often libertine, among which there is a long poem against the Jesuits titled Philotanus, burlesque pieces, epistles, fables, tales, epigrams, madrigals. He refrained from having them printed but circulated them secretly, giving extracts in selected circles, because he read, it seems, in an incomparable manner. Although he didn't usually write them down himself, others would write down what they remembered, like with Philotanus prior to its publication. Others compiled his poems and works themselves after his death.

When the Papal bull Unigenitus was passed in 1713 banning Jansenist teachings, Grécourt was displeased and at some point beginning to compose a poem criticizing it, with the result being the poem Philotanus, whose earliest written copy is from 1719 and first official publishing was in 1720. In 1723 he composed a comedy set to song titled Rillions-Rillettes which opposed the obtaining of a bishopric by Duchamp Dumont, a graduate of the College of Sorbonne, after being instigated by several members of the chapter of Saint-Martin after they received a letter from him.

In December 1733, he received a promise from a Sr. Delapotterie that he would pay 1231 livres, 15 sols, and 5 deniers. He was one of the main authors of Recueil de poésies choisies rassemblées par un cosmopolite, printed in 1735 in only 62 copies for the Duke of Aiguillon. On June 11, 1741, Grécourt saw notary Michau and Jacques Philippe de Beaucombat in order to receive a lease for the canonical house of Tours, which was granted at the price of 300 pounds every half-year for the next seven years.

He died in his bedroom in Saint-Martin, Tours on April 2, 1743, leaving a pleasant epitaph for himself:

Il est mort, le pauvre chrétien!
Molina perd un adversaire
Et l'amour un historien.
Si je consulte son bréviaire
La religion n'y perd rien.

On May 6, 1743, an inventory of his estate was taken at the request of his niece, Jeanne Chastelin, his heir, with notary Nicolas Dreux compiling the list from the 6th to the 8th, and then on the 10th and the 11th.

== Works ==
- Philotanus, ou l'Histoire de la constitution Unigenitus, poem, 1719
- Les Appellants de l'autre monde, 1731–1732
- Les Nouveaux appellants; ou la Bibliothèque des damnés. Nouvelles de l'autre monde, 1732
- L'Enfer révolté, ou les Nouveaux appellants de l'autre monde, confondus Lucifer, 1732
- L'Enfer en déroute par la doctrine des jésuites. Nouvelles de l'autre monde, 1733
- Maranzakiniana, 1733
- Recueil de pièces choisies rassemblées par les soins du cosmopolite, 1735
- Histoire véritable et divertissante de la naissance de Mlle Margo, et de ses aventures jusqu'à présent, 1735
