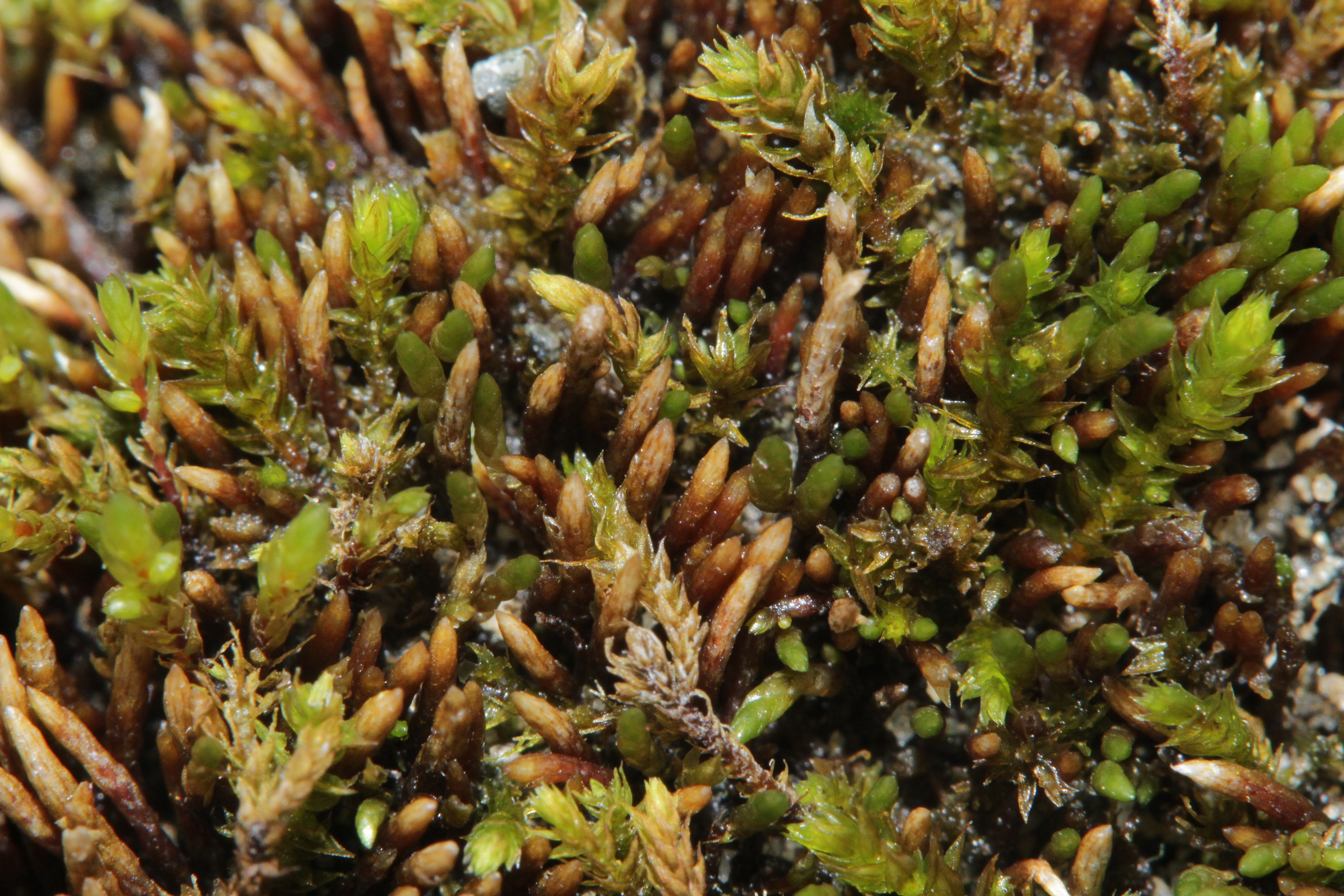
- In Austria

Scientific classification
- Kingdom: Plantae
- Division: Bryophyta
- Class: Bryopsida
- Subclass: Bryidae
- Order: Bryales
- Family: Bryaceae
- Genus: Anomobryum
- Species: A. julaceum

Binomial name
- Anomobryum julaceum (Dicks.) Solms in Rabenh.

Synonyms
- Anomobryum concinnatum (Spruce) Lindb.; Anomobryum julaceum (Brid.) Schimp.; Bryum filiforme Dicks.; Pohlia filiformis (Dicks.) Andrews in Grout; Pohlia filiformis var. concinnata (Spruce) Grout

= Anomobryum julaceum =

Species of moss

Anomobryum julaceum, the slender silver-moss, is a species of bryophyte native to all continents except South America and Antarctica. A. julaceum is found widespread in the temperate regions of the Northern and Southern Hemispheres. Its capsules mature beginning in late fall and through the spring. It is most commonly found in wet crevices and on sandstone cliffs. Additional micro-habitats include tussock tundra with seeps and late snow melt areas and on granitic outcrops. In eastern North America it appears to be restricted to acid habitats, in the wet crevices of sandstone cliffs or other seepy niches. Overall, A. julaceum resembles species of the genus Pohlia, and its leaves are similar to those of Bryum argenteum; it can only be separated from Pohlia and Bryum using a microscope. Anomobryum julaceum can be distinguished from Bryum argenteum by its strongly julaceous, shiny leaves.

== Taxonomic history ==
A number of names have been used for this species. In 1802 this species was first described as Bryum julaceum. In 1860, the species was transferred to Anomobryum filiforme. In 1935 Andrews combined both names into Pohlia filiformis (Grout 1935). Lawton (1971), Crum and Anderson (1981), and Ireland (1982) and used the name Pohlia filiformis. Sharp, Crum and Eckel (1994) chose to use the prior name, Bryum filiforme and Noguchi (1988) used Anomobryum filiforme. Based on the international rules of nomenclature, Crosby et al. (1999) placed all of the above names under the name Anomobryum julaceum.

== Technical description ==
Plants are described as small, slender, julaceous, yellowish to pale-green, often whitish green in color. They form dense shiny tufts or scattered shoots with reddish stems. The leaves are .5-1.5 mm long with narrow, linear-vermicular thick-walled upper leaf cells. Lower leaf cells are broadly rectangular, thin-walled, and often bulging. Aongstroemia orientalis is a similar-looking species to A. julaceum in having short, julaceous stems and broadly obtuse leaves. The leaves are ovate or oblong-ovate, concave, not decurrent. The apex is sometimes serrated at the apex. The sporophyte has setae that can grow up to 2 cm long and has spores that are approximately 10 um. The species also has a double peristome and endostome with appendiculate cilia.

Their stems are orange and forked by innovations and often produce numerous red ovoid brood bodies in the leaf axils.

== Range and distribution ==
Anomobryum filliforme is widespread in the temperate regions of the Northern and Southern hemispheres. In the Pacific Northwest it is known to be found in Alaska, British Columbia, Oregon and California. The Oregon Natural Heritage Information Center reports it from Baker, Clatsop, and Klamath Counties.

== Threats ==
Trail, road, ski trail construction, and quarrying could eliminate local populations by destroying substratum and habitat. Rock climbing can impact populations on cliffs. In the state of California, it is included on the CNPS Inventory of Rare and Endangered Plants of California.

== Life history ==
There are few details known about the life history of the Anomobryum filiforme. Protonema, bud and shoot formation is typical for all moss development. Asexual reproductive structures have not been reported for this species.
