= Bizot =

Bizot is a surname. Notable people with the surname include:

- Abbé Denis Bizot (ca. 17th C. - ca. 1752), a doctor of Theology from the College of Sorbonne and priest
- Christian Bizot (1928–2002), French winemaker, head of the Bollinger Champagne house
- François Bizot (born 1940), French anthropologist
- Henry Bizot (1901–1990), French banker, first chairman of Banque Nationale de Paris, father of Christian
- Marco Bizot (born 1991), Dutch football goalkeeper
- Maurice Bizot, (1896–1925), French World War I flying ace
- Thierry Bizot (born 1962), French television producer and author

== See also ==
- Le Bizot, France
