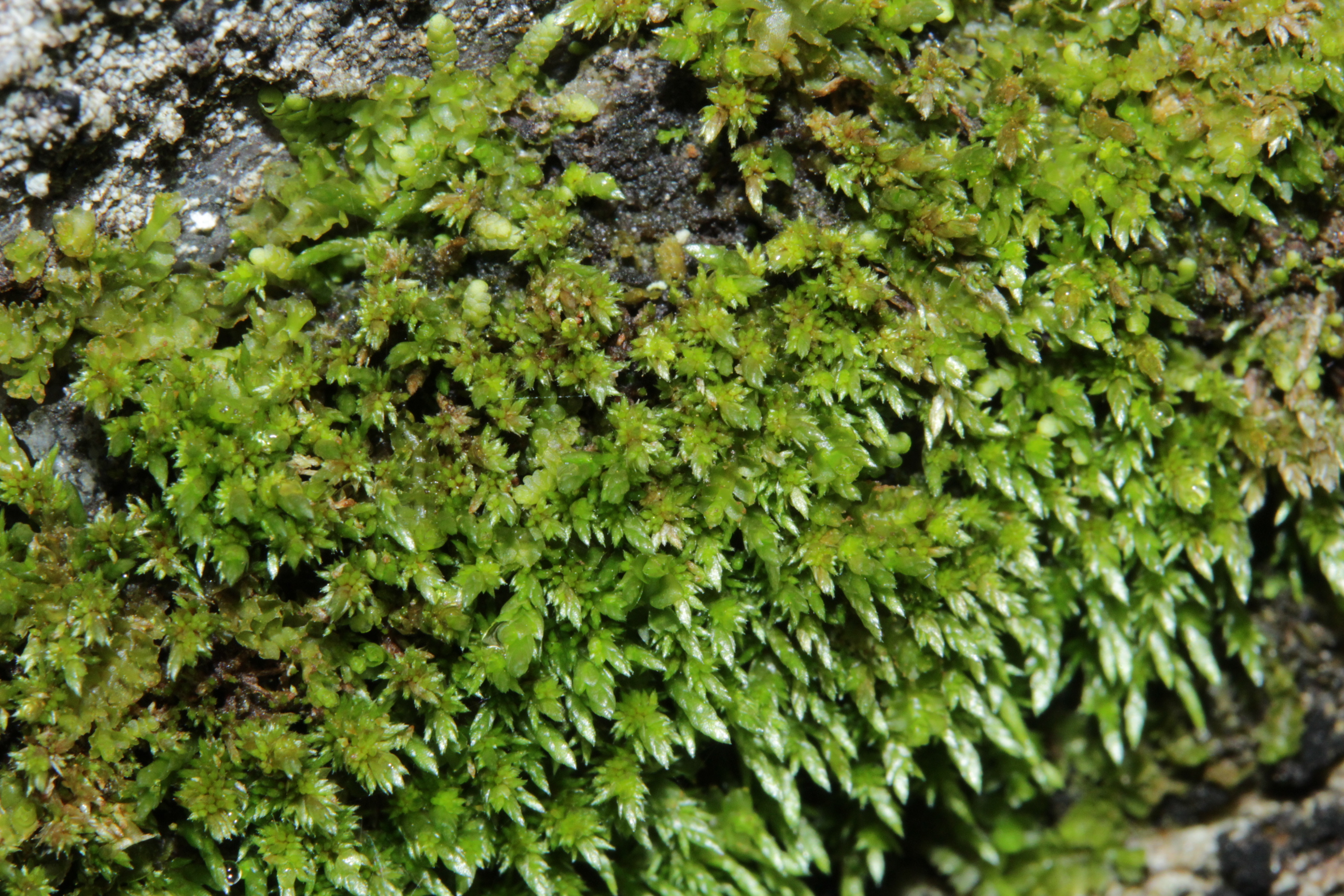
- Anomobryum concinnatum

Scientific classification
- Kingdom: Plantae
- Division: Bryophyta
- Class: Bryopsida
- Subclass: Bryidae
- Order: Bryales
- Family: Bryaceae
- Genus: Anomobryum; Schimp.

= Anomobryum =

Genus of mosses

Anomobryum is a genus of mosses belonging to the family Bryaceae.

The genus was first described by Wilhelm Philippe Schimper.

The genus has cosmopolitan distribution.

Species:

- Anomobryum albo-imbricatum T. Koponen & Norris, 1984
- Anomobryum alpinum Zang Mu & Li Xing-jiang, 1985
- Anomobryum angustirete Brotherus 1927
- Anomobryum astorense Brotherus 1903
- Anomobryum auratum Jaeger 1875
- Anomobryum brachymenioides Dixon & Potier de la Varde 1930
- Anomobryum brachymeniopsis Brotherus 1903
- Anomobryum bulbiferum E. B. Bartram 1942
- Anomobryum bullatum (C. Müller) Brotherus 1903
- Anomobryum clavicaule Brotherus 1903
- Anomobryum compressulum Brotherus 1903
- Anomobryum conicum Brotherus 1903
- Anomobryum cygnicollum Jaeger 1875
- Anomobryum drakensbergense Rooy 1986
- Anomobryum erectum B. C. Tan & T. Koponen 1989
- Anomobryum filinerve Brotherus 1903
- Anomobryum gemmigerum Brotherus 1910
- Anomobryum harriottii Dixon 1926
- Anomobryum humillimum Brotherus 1903
- Anomobryum hyalinum T. Koponen & Norris 1984
- Anomobryum julaceum W. P. Schimper 1860
- Anomobryum kashmirense Brotherus 1903
- Anomobryum laceratum Brotherus 1903
- Anomobryum lanatum Spence & H.P.Ramsay, 2002
- Anomobryum leptostomoides W. P. Schimper 1873
- Anomobryum lusitanicum Thériot 1933
- Anomobryum marginatum Dixon & Badhwar 1938
- Anomobryum minutirete Kis 1984
- Anomobryum nidificans Coppey 1911
- Anomobryum obtusatissimum Brotherus 1903
- Anomobryum ochianum A. J. Shaw ex A. J. Shaw & Fife 1984
- Anomobryum ochii T. Koponen & Norris 1984
- Anomobryum parvifolium E. B. Bartram 1961
- Anomobryum pellucidum Dixon & Badhwar 1938
- Anomobryum polymorphum Dixon 1938
- Anomobryum polysetum A. J. Shaw 1986
- Anomobryum prostratum Bescherelle 1872
- Anomobryum pycnobaseum Brotherus 1903
- Anomobryum schmidii Jaeger 1875
- Anomobryum semiovatum Jaeger 1875
- Anomobryum semireticulatum Brotherus 1903
- Anomobryum sharpii A. J. Shaw ex A. J. Shaw & Fife 1984
- Anomobryum soquense Brotherus 1903
- Anomobryum steerei A. J. Shaw 1987
- Anomobryum subnitidum Cardot & Potier de la Varde 1923
- Anomobryum subrotundifolium Spence & H. P. Ramsay 2002
- Anomobryum tereticaule A. J. Shaw ex A. J. Shaw & Fife 1984
- Anomobryum werthii Brotherus ex Drygalski 1906
- Anomobryum worthleyi H. Robinson 1967
- Anomobryum yasudae Brotherus 1921
