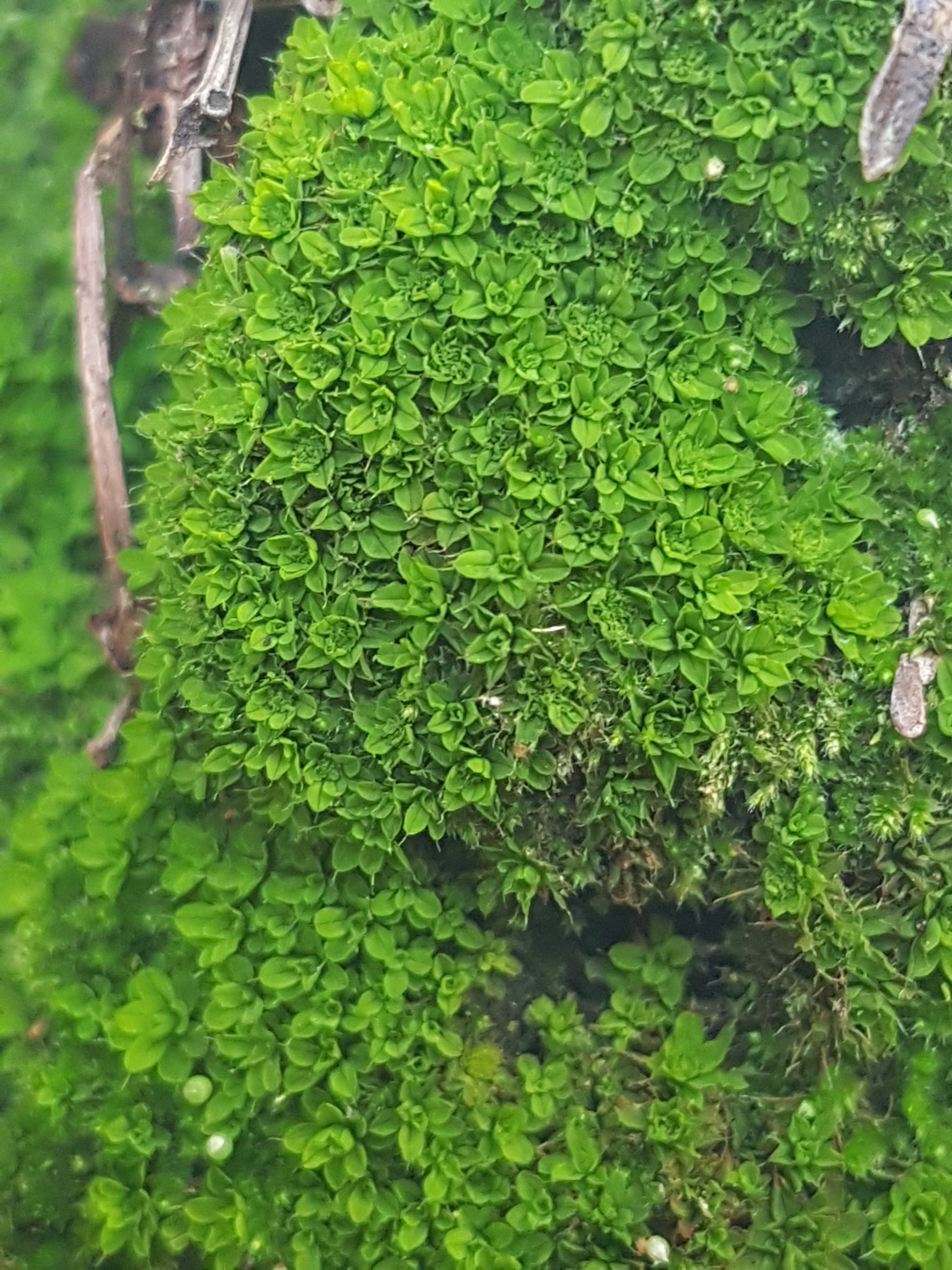

Scientific classification
- Kingdom: Plantae
- Division: Bryophyta
- Class: Bryopsida
- Subclass: Bryidae
- Order: Bryales
- Family: Bryaceae
- Genus: Rhodobryum
- Species: R. roseum

Binomial name
- Rhodobryum roseum (Hedw.) Limpr.

Synonyms
- Bryum leucothrix Müll. Hal.; Mnium proliferum Leyss. ex With.; Mnium roseum Hedw.; Mnium spathulatum Hornsch.

= Rhodobryum roseum =

Species of moss

Rhodobryum roseum, commonly known as rose moss, is a species of moss of the subclass Bryidae and family Bryaceae, found throughout most of the world in woods or sheltered grassy places. It rarely forms sporophytes and spore cases, and primarily reproduces vegetatively by stolons, horizontal stems that root at the nodes, resulting in populations of plants that are sterile or only female.

== Description ==
This species forms characteristic rosettes of leaves at the ends of secondary stems, which in turn grow from a wiry, creeping primary stem. The rosette of some 18-22 leaves somewhat resembles a small green rose. The leaf margins are revolute and finely toothed towards the leaf tip, which ends in a short mucronate point. The leaf midrib is prominent. Leaves growing on the primary stem are small and scale-like, while the basal leaves on the secondary stems are also very small. It occurs in short grassland in open woodland, occasionally in forests, heaths, sand dunes and chalk grassland, and on grassy rock ledges and tree trunks.

== Uses ==
This is a useful medicinal species. Extracts such as ursolic acid, flavonoids and alkaloids have been used in cardiac and other medical research. Mosses show great diversity in morphology and anatomy of their gametophytes and sporophytes. Because of their small sizes it is difficult differentiating between Rhodobryum roseum and its adulterants by traditional methods. In particular Rhodobryum roseum is often confused with Rhodobryum ontariense, and Plagiomnium actum, Plagiomnium maximoviczii and Mnium laevinarve from closely allied taxa.
