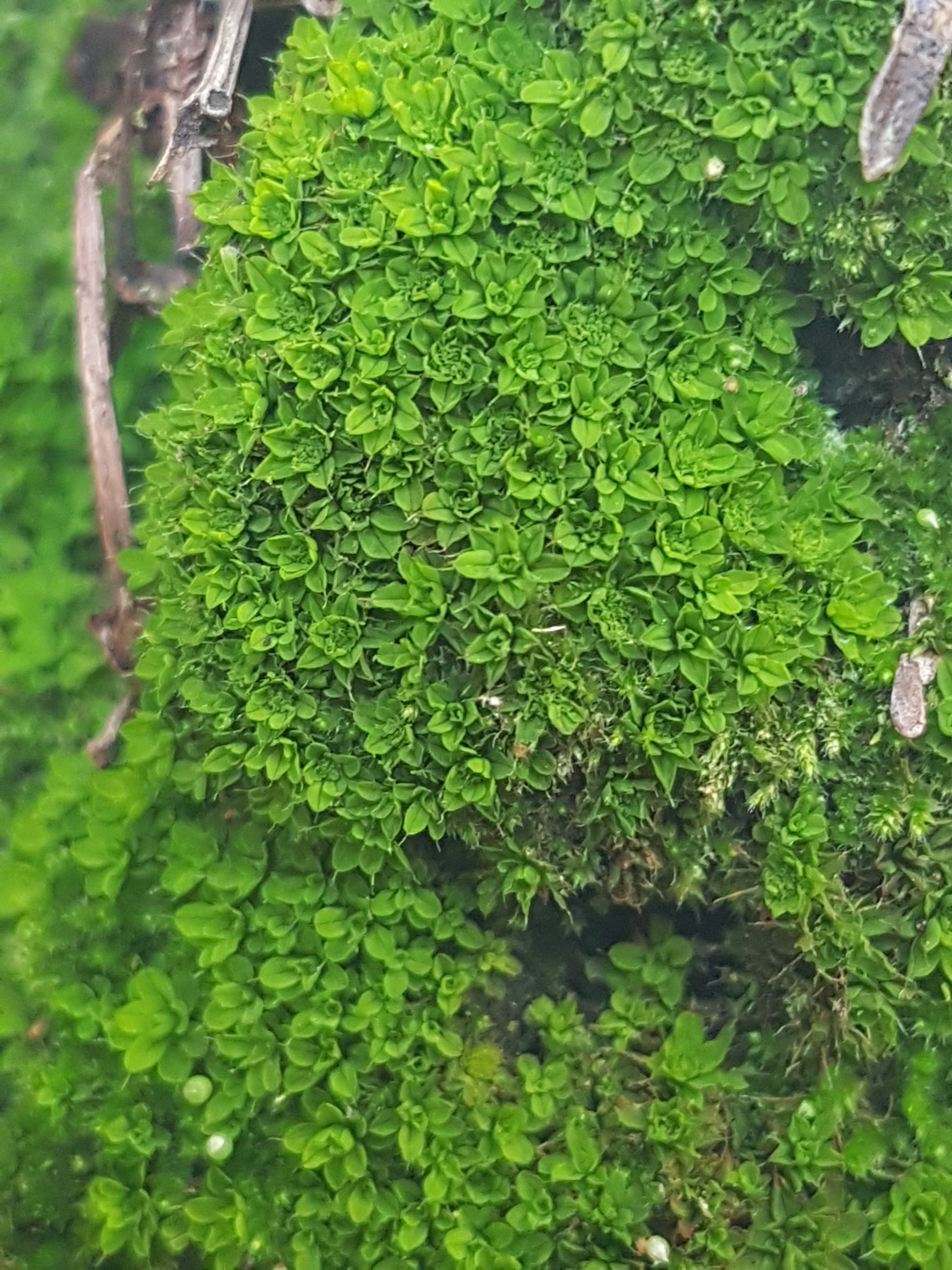
- Rhodobryum roseum

Scientific classification
- Kingdom: Plantae
- Division: Bryophyta
- Class: Bryopsida
- Subclass: Bryidae
- Order: Bryales
- Family: Bryaceae
- Genus: Rhodobryum (Schimp.) Limpr

= Rhodobryum =

Genus of mosses

Rhodobryum is a genus of mosses belonging to the family Bryaceae.

The genus has cosmopolitan distribution.

== Species ==
As of December 2024, World Flora Online accepts 19 species and 78 synonyms.

- Rhodobryum andinoroseum (Müll. Hal.) Paris
- Rhodobryum beyrichianum (Hornsch.) Paris
- Rhodobryum chilense Thér.
- Rhodobryum commersonii (Schwägr.) Paris
- Rhodobryum confluens Paris
- Rhodobryum dentatum (Ochi) T.J. Kop. & E. Fuertes
- Rhodobryum domingense (Brid.) Besch.
- Rhodobryum giganteum (Schwägr.) Paris
- Rhodobryum grandifolium (Taylor) Schimp.
- Rhodobryum lato-cuspidatum (Müll. Hal.) Paris
- Rhodobryum laxelimbatum (Hampe ex Ochi) Z. Iwats. & T.J. Kop.
- Rhodobryum ontariense (Kindb.) Paris
- Rhodobryum preussii (Broth.) Paris
- Rhodobryum roseodens (Müll. Hal.) Paris
- Rhodobryum roseum (Hedw.) Limpr.
- Rhodobryum staudtii (Broth.) Paris
- Rhodobryum subverticillatum Broth.
- Rhodobryum umbraculum (Burch. ex Hook.) Schimp. ex Paris
- Rhodobryum utriculosum (Müll. Hal.) Paris
