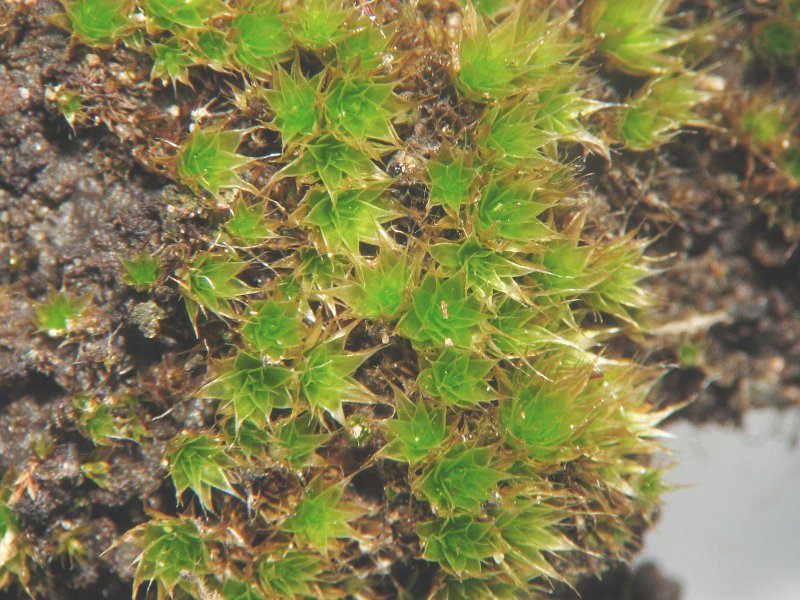
- Gemmabryum caespiticium

Scientific classification
- Kingdom: Plantae
- Division: Bryophyta
- Class: Bryopsida
- Subclass: Bryidae
- Order: Bryales
- Family: Bryaceae
- Genus: Gemmabryum; J.R. Spence & H.P. Ramsay

Species
- See text.

= Gemmabryum =

Genus of moss

Gemmabryum is a genus of moss in the family Bryaceae. It was separated from the genera Bryum and Brachymenium in 2005. It has been argued that the correct name for the genus is Osculatia.

== Taxonomy ==
The genus Gemmabryum was first described by J. R. Spence and H. P. Ramsay in 2005. Species previously placed in three sections of the genus Bryum and one section of the genus Brachymenium were transferred to the new genus, which is accepted by the World Flora Online database as of March 2024. Other sources retain the genus Bryum. In 2018, it was argued that the genus name Osculatia De Not. had priority for this segregate of Bryum and Brachymenium.

=== Species ===
As of March 2024, World Flora Online accepted the following species:

- Gemmabryum acuminatum (Harv.) J.R. Spence & H.P. Ramsay
- Gemmabryum apiculatum (Schwägr.) J.R. Spence & H.P. Ramsay
- Gemmabryum austrosabulosum J.R. Spence & H.P. Ramsay
- Gemmabryum badium (Brid.) J.R. Spence
- Gemmabryum barnesii (J.B. Wood ex Schimp.) J.R. Spence
- Gemmabryum brassicoides J.R. Spence & Kellman
- Gemmabryum caespiticium (Hedw.) J.R. Spence
- Gemmabryum californicum (Sull.) J.R. Spence
- Gemmabryum chrysoneuron (Müll. Hal.) J.R. Spence & H.P. Ramsay
- Gemmabryum coarctatum (Bosch & Sande Lac.) J.R. Spence & H.P. Ramsay
- Gemmabryum coronatum (Schwägr.) J.R. Spence & H.P. Ramsay
- Gemmabryum demaretianum (Arts) J.R. Spence
- Gemmabryum dichotomum (Hedw.) J.R. Spence & H.P. Ramsay
- Gemmabryum eremaeum (Catches. ex J.R. Spence & H.P. Ramsay) J.R. Spence & H.P. Ramsay
- Gemmabryum erythropilum (M. Fleisch.) J.R. Spence & H.P. Ramsay
- Gemmabryum exile (Dozy & Molk.) J.R. Spence & H.P. Ramsay
- Gemmabryum flavituber (R. Wilczek & Demaret) J.R. Spence
- Gemmabryum gemmiferum (R. Wilczek & Demaret) J.R. Spence
- Gemmabryum gemmilucens (R. Wilczek & Demaret) J.R. Spence
- Gemmabryum inaequale (Taylor) J.R. Spence & H.P. Ramsay
- Gemmabryum indicum (Dozy & Molk.) J.R. Spence & H.P. Ramsay
- Gemmabryum klinggraeffii (Schimp.) J.R. Spence & H.P. Ramsay
- Gemmabryum kunzei (Hornsch.) J.R. Spence
- Gemmabryum mauiense (Broth.) J.R. Spence
- Gemmabryum nanoapiculatum (Ochi & Kürschner) Kürschner
- Gemmabryum pachytheca (Müll. Hal.) J.R. Spence & H.P. Ramsay
- Gemmabryum preissianum (Hampe) J.R. Spence & H.P. Ramsay
- Gemmabryum radiculosum (Brid.) J.R. Spence & H.P. Ramsay
- Gemmabryum ruderale (Crundw. & Nyholm) J.R. Spence
- Gemmabryum sauteri (Bruch & Schimp.) J.R. Spence & H.P. Ramsay
- Gemmabryum subapiculatum (Hampe) J.R. Spence & H.P. Ramsay
- Gemmabryum sullivanii (Müll. Hal.) J.R. Spence & H.P. Ramsay
- Gemmabryum tenuisetum (Limpr.) J.R. Spence & H.P. Ramsay
- Gemmabryum tuberosum (Mohamed & Damanhuri) J.R. Spence & H.P. Ramsay
- Gemmabryum valparaisense (Thér.) J.R. Spence
- Gemmabryum vinosum J.R. Spence & Kellman
- Gemmabryum violaceum (Crundw. & Nyholm) J.R. Spence
