= Abbé Denis Bizot =

French poet

Abbé Denis Bizot (also Denys Bizot) (c. 17th C. – c. 1752) (alias l'Abbé Bizot) was a French Jansenist abbot, poet and doctor of Theology at the College of Sorbonne who, in addition to some original Latin verses, translated a handful of poems and hymns from French into Latin. Although his bibliography is limited, he was known for quality work.

== Life ==
Denis Bizot was born sometime in the late 1600s and was a priest and attending the College of Sorbonne in Paris, France by 1705. However, he doesn't seem to have ever taught. In 1707, he translated the first canto of the poem Lutrin by Nicolas Boileau-Despréaux into Latin with no intentions of translating the others. However, he eventually showed it to Desperaux, who loved it, and commented that it was even better than the French. The quality of his translation attracted negative attention from local poets, however, and they had a mutual friend invite Bizot to a dinner they would also be attending without his knowledge.

During the dinner, the jealous poets bet 50 crowns that Bizot could not translate the fifth canto as skillfully as he had done the first, calling it beginner's luck. Bizot accepted the bet as he needed the money and after he had calmed down from the confrontation, he felt overwhelmed by the challenge. However, he still completed his translation of the fifth canto in 1708 and won the bet. These two cantos were published as separate volumes titled Plutei, e gallico in latinum conversi, liber primus and Plutei, e gallico in latinum conversi, liber quintus.

On 30 October 1718 he, along with several other doctors of Theology, met at the College of Sorbonne to discuss the acceptance of the Papal bull Unigenitus and whether or not the excommunications carried out by Pope Clement XI through the bull Pastoralis officii, which was passed in August of that year, were legal. His name appears in the list of those who believed in the illegality of these excommunications between Jacques Le Fèvre and Jacques de la Chaux.

He was present at the burial of Marie-Anne Horthemels on 25 March 1727 alongside her son and his cousin Germain-Jaques Lecocq, with both signing her death certificate. Two years later, he also attended assemblies held in November and December 1729, and January 1730 to discuss the bull Unigenitus again. Once again, he sided with the opposition.

Additionally, he is believed to have written the inscription on the engraving by Horthemels's younger son, Jacques-Nicolas Tardieu named The Pool at Bethesda around the year 1752, and he died sometime later while serving as a normal priest at Saint-Eustache.

== Works ==
=== Original Works ===
- Arnaldi Tumulus (c.1694)
- In Societatis Jesu Patres satyram viri clarissimi Despereaux de Divino Amore deme livido male carpentes. (c.1694)
- Nobilissimo abbati Julio Adriano de Noailles, insignis et metropolitanae ecclesiae parisiensis canonico; quum publicas theses de universa philosophia in collegio Sorbonne-Plessaeo propugnaret et laurea artium donaretur die XXVII mensis julii an. Dom. MDCCVII (1707)
- Nobilissimo et illustrissimo viro Hilario Rouillé du Coudray, Comiti Consistoriano, cùm ejus filius, Abbas nobilissimus, Dionysius Rouillé du Coudray Theses Philosophicas pro Laurea Artium in Sorbonae-Plessaeo propugnaret, die Dom. 7 Augusti, an 1707 (1707)
- Beatis Cosmae et Damiano
- Hymnes Latines et Françoises

=== Translations ===
- Plutei e gallico e latinum, liber primus (1707)
- Plutei e gallico e latinum, liber quintus (1708)
- Philotanus (c. 1720) (attributed)
