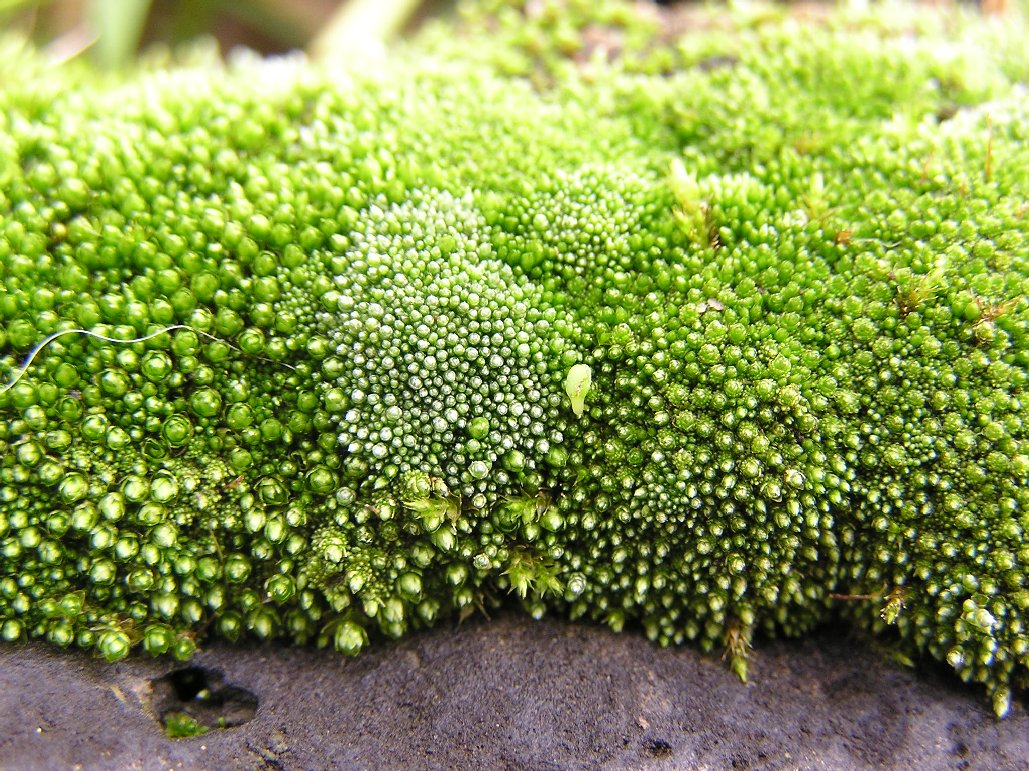
- Bryum argenteum

Scientific classification
- Kingdom: Plantae
- Division: Bryophyta
- Class: Bryopsida
- Subclass: Bryidae
- Order: Bryales
- Family: Bryaceae
- Genus: Bryum; Hedw.

Species
- List of Bryum species

= Bryum =

Genus of mosses

Bryum is a genus of mosses in the family Bryaceae. It was considered the largest genus of mosses, in terms of the number of species (over 1000), until it was split into three separate genera in a 2005 publication. As of 2013, the classification of both Bryum and the family Bryaceae to which it belongs underwent significant changes based on DNA studies.

== Description ==
Bryum is a polyphyletic genus that has high morphological variation. Bryum species generally have shorter laminal cells with short, thick, and rounded stems. All Bryum species exhibit narrowed cells at the margins. Bryum species can be identified through patterns of asexual reproduction, coloration features of the stem and leaf base, and the strength of the leaf border.

== History ==
The genus was described by Johann Hedwig in 1801, with the name being derived from the Greek word for moss.

Botanist John R. Spence published a reclassification of the genus in 2005. The genus Ptychostomum was reinstated, while the genera Leptostomopsis, and Plagiobryoides were created. The genera Gemmabryum, Imbribryum, and Rosulabryum were later published to further divide Bryum.
