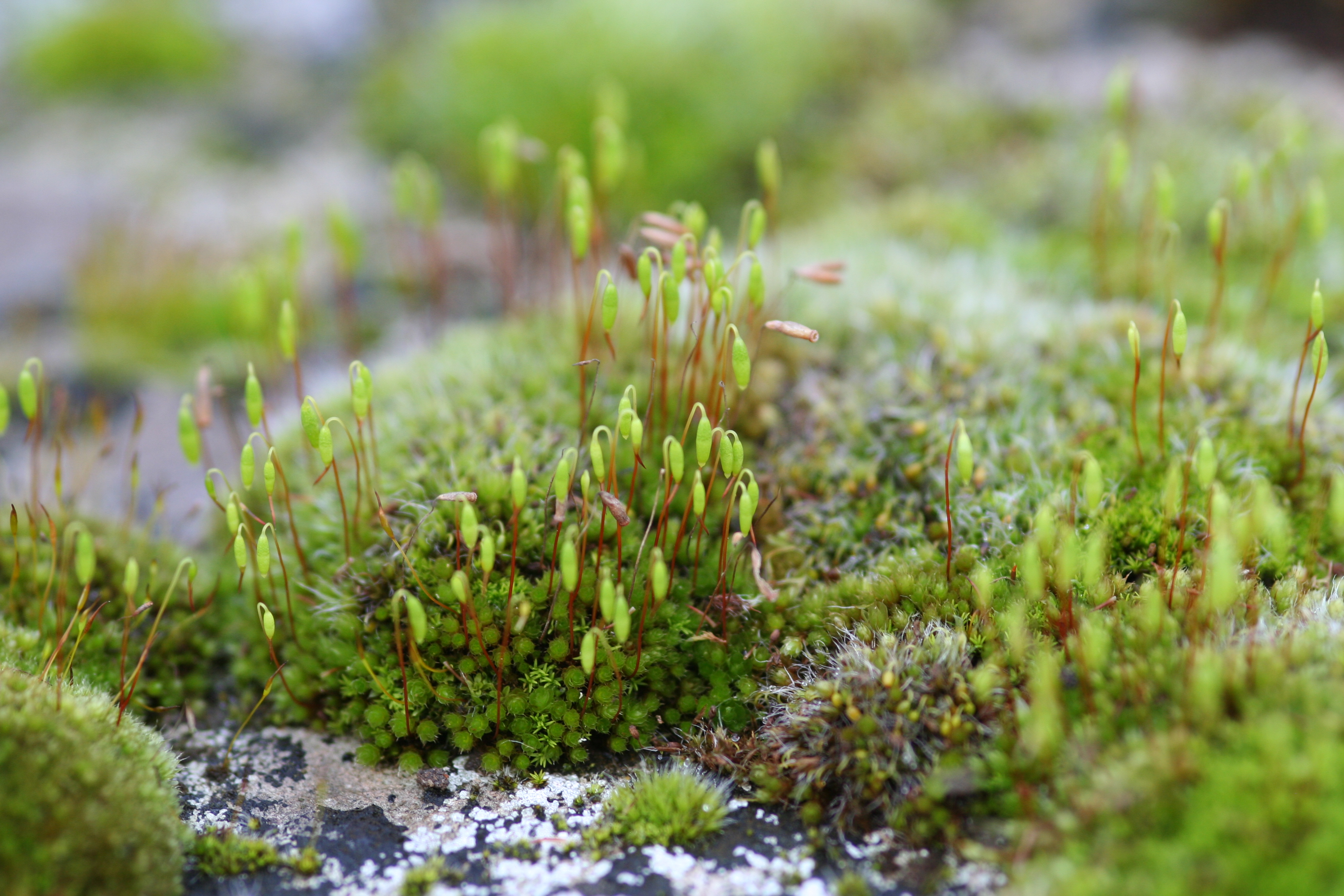
- Bryum capillare

Scientific classification
- Kingdom: Plantae
- Division: Bryophyta
- Class: Bryopsida
- Subclass: Bryidae
- Order: Bryales
- Family: Bryaceae

Genera
- See text

= Bryaceae =

Family of mosses

Bryaceae is a family of mosses.

== Genera ==
Genera include:

- Acidodontium Schwägr.
- Anomobryum Schimp. (e.g. Anomobryum julaceum)
- Brachymenium Schwägr.
- Bryum Hedw.
- Gemmabryum J.R. Spence & H.P. Ramsay
- Haplodontium Hampe
- Imbribryum N. Pedersen
- Leptostomopsis (Müll. Hal.) J. R. Spence & H. P. Ramsay (formerly part of Bryum)
- Mniobryoides Hörmann
- Ochiobryum J. R. Spence & H. P. Ramsay
- Osculatia De Not.
- Perssonia Bizot
- Plagiobryoides J. R. Spence
- Plagiobryum Lindb.
- Ptychostomum Hornsch. (formerly part of Bryum)
- Rhodobryum (Schimp.) Limpr. (e.g. Rhodobryum roseum)
- Rosulabryum J. R. Spence

=== Formerly included ===
- Roellobryon Ochyra (formerly known as Roellia, now a part of Roellobryaceae)
