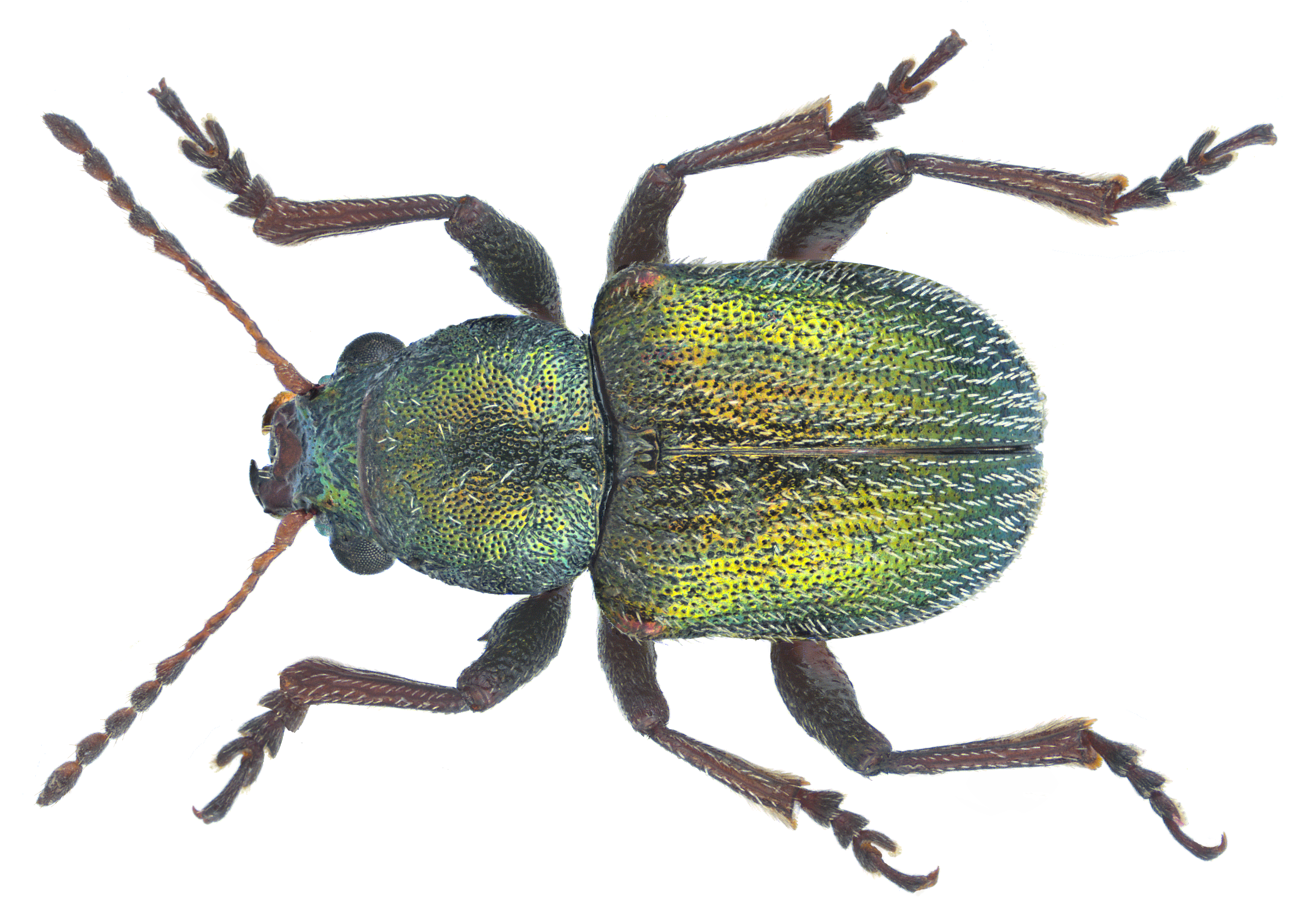
- Macrocoma rubripes (Schaufuss, 1862)

Scientific classification
- Kingdom: Animalia
- Phylum: Arthropoda
- Clade: Pancrustacea
- Class: Insecta
- Order: Coleoptera
- Suborder: Polyphaga
- Infraorder: Cucujiformia
- Family: Chrysomelidae
- Subfamily: Eumolpinae
- Tribe: Bromiini
- Genus: Macrocoma; Chapuis, 1874

Type species
- Macrocoma eriophora Chapuis, 1874

Synonyms
- Eubrachis Baly, 1878 (nec Dejean, 1836); Adoxinia Reitter, 1889; Ischyromus Jacobson, 1893

= Macrocoma =

Genus of leaf beetles

Macrocoma is a genus of leaf beetles in the subfamily Eumolpinae. It contains about 100 species, which are found in tropical Africa, around the Mediterranean, on the Canary Islands, the Savage Islands, in western and central Asia, and in India.

Macrocoma is closely related to the African genus Pseudocolaspis, and has sometimes been treated as a junior synonym of it historically. The two genera are distinguished by the exposure of the pygidium and the shape of the anterior edges of the prosternum: in Macrocoma, the pygidium is covered by the elytra and the anterior edges of the prosternum are flat, while in Pseudocolaspis, the pygidium is more than half-exposed and the anterior edges of the prosternum are convex. Currently, several species are not arranged according to these characters.

== Species ==
Species include:

- Macrocoma aeneonigra (Fairmaire, 1873) – Algeria
- Macrocoma aladina Daccordi & Medvedev, 1996 – Saudi Arabia
- Macrocoma andamanensis (Jacoby, 1908) – Andaman Islands
- Macrocoma apicicornis (Jacoby, 1897)
- Macrocoma aureovillosa (Marshall, 1865)
- Macrocoma bengalensis (Duvivier, 1892) – East India
- Macrocoma bequaerti Burgeon, 1940
- Macrocoma bertiae Moseyko, 2013 – Iran
- Macrocoma bezdeki Zoia, 2012 – Socotra
- Macrocoma bipartita Kocher, 1962 – Morocco
- Macrocoma bipilosa (Schaufuss, 1871)
- Macrocoma bolivari (Escalera, 1914) – Morocco
  - Macrocoma bolivari antiatlantis Kocher, 1966
  - Macrocoma bolivari bolivari (Escalera, 1914)
- Macrocoma brunnea Bryant, 1957 – Yemen
- Macrocoma brunnipes (Olivier, 1808)
  - Macrocoma brunnipes brunnipes (Olivier, 1808) – Iraq, Israel, Jordan, Syria, Egypt (Sinai Peninsula)
  - Macrocoma brunnipes obscuricolor (Pic, 1905) – Turkey
- Macrocoma budura Daccordi & Medvedev, 1996 – Saudi Arabia
- Macrocoma buettikeriana Daccordi, 1979 – Israel, Saudi Arabia, Egypt (Sinai Peninsula), Yemen
- Macrocoma calliptoides Lopatin, 1996 – Iraq
- Macrocoma carbonaria (Lefèvre, 1876) – Algeria
- Macrocoma chrysites (Gerstaecker, 1871) – East Africa, Yemen
- Macrocoma crassipes (Lefèvre, 1876) – Algeria, Morocco
- Macrocoma cylindrica (Küster, 1846) – Spain
- Macrocoma daccordii Medvedev, 1996 – Yemen
- Macrocoma dakkai Kocher, 1962 – Morocco
- Macrocoma debduensis Kocher, 1967 – Morocco
- Macrocoma delagrangei (Pic, 1898) – Iran, Syria, Turkey
- Macrocoma dimorpha (Medvedev, 1956) – Iraq
- Macrocoma discoidalis (Jacoby, 1896) – North and East India
- Macrocoma diversesignata Pic, 1939
- Macrocoma divisa (Wollaston, 1864) – Canary Islands
- Macrocoma djurdjurensis Warchałowski, 2001 – Algeria
- Macrocoma doboszi Borowiec, 2005 – Turkey
- Macrocoma dubia (Wollaston, 1864) – Canary Islands
- Macrocoma eriophora Chapuis, 1874
- Macrocoma ertli Weise, 1911
- Macrocoma femoralis (Weise, 1902)
- Macrocoma fortidens (Berti & Rapilly, 1973) – Turkey
- Macrocoma fulvohirta (Gestro, 1895)
- Macrocoma fuscoaenea (Chapuis, 1879)
- Macrocoma haiensis Kocher, 1967 – Morocco
- Macrocoma haliporphyrea (Marshall, 1865)
- Macrocoma hargreavesi Bryant, 1938
- Macrocoma henoni (Pic, 1894)
  - Macrocoma henoni babylonica Lopatin, 1986 – Iraq
  - Macrocoma henoni henoni (Pic, 1894) – Algeria, Morocco
  - Macrocoma henoni occidentalis (Escalera, 1914) – Algeria, Morocco
- Macrocoma heydeni (Lefèvre, 1876) – Morocco
- Macrocoma himalayensis (Jacoby, 1900) – Southwest China (Xizang), North India (Himachal Pradesh)
- Macrocoma hulai Zoia, 2012 – Socotra
- Macrocoma impressa Achard, 1925
- Macrocoma indica (Baly, 1878)
  - Macrocoma indica afghana Medvedev, 1985 – Afghanistan
  - Macrocoma indica indica (Baly, 1878) – Southwest China (Xizang), North India, Nepal
- Macrocoma iranica Lopatin, 1984 – Iran
- Macrocoma janthina (Fairmaire, 1887)
- Macrocoma kabakovi Medvedev, 1985 – Afghanistan
- Macrocoma korbi (Pic, 1901) – Turkey
- Macrocoma latifrons Lindberg, 1953 – Canary Islands (Tenerife)
- Macrocoma lefevrei (Baly, 1878) – Iran, Oman, Saudi Arabia
- Macrocoma leprieuri (Lefèvre, 1876)
  - Macrocoma leprieuri leprieuri (Lefèvre, 1876) – Algeria, Morocco, Tunisia, United Arab Emirates, Egypt (Sinai Peninsula)
  - Macrocoma leprieuri majuscula Bechyné, 1957 – Egypt (Sinai Peninsula)
- Macrocoma marquardti (Breit, 1913) – Pakistan, Southwest China (Xizang)
- Macrocoma mateui Kocher, 1959 – Morocco (Western Sahara)
- Macrocoma melillensis Kocher, 1967 – Morocco
- Macrocoma meruensis (Weise, 1909)
- Macrocoma micula Lopatin, 1995 – Afghanistan
- Macrocoma millingeni (Pic, 1898) – Iran, Oman, Saudi Arabia
- Macrocoma minuta Medvedev, 1985 – Afghanistan
- Macrocoma minutula (Fairmaire, 1887)
- Macrocoma monardi Pic, 1939
- Macrocoma mosambica Kolbe, 1897
- Macrocoma niedobovae Zoia, 2012 – Socotra
- Macrocoma nitidipennis (Weise, 1909)
- Macrocoma obscuripes (Wollaston, 1862) – Canary Islands (Gran Canaria)
- Macrocoma oneili (Jacoby, 1904)
- Macrocoma orientalis (Jacoby, 1895) – India (Mumbai), Myanmar
- Macrocoma oromiana Daccordi, 1978 – Canary Islands (Alegranza), Savage Islands (Selvagem Grande)
- Macrocoma pakistana Medvedev, 2000 – Pakistan
- Macrocoma parvula (Jacoby, 1895)
- Macrocoma pelikani Zoia, 2017 – Canary Islands (Gran Canaria)
- Macrocoma peyerimhoffi Kocher, 1959 – Morocco
- Macrocoma purpureonotata Pic, 1939
- Macrocoma robusta Lopatin, 1984 – Iran
- Macrocoma rotroui Kocher, 1962 – Morocco
- Macrocoma rubripes (Schaufuss, 1862)
  - Macrocoma rubripes rubripes (Schaufuss, 1862) – Southeast Europe, West Asia
  - Macrocoma rubripes turkmena Lopatin, 1976 – Turkmenistan
- Macrocoma rufipes Weise, 1910
- Macrocoma rufotibialis (Jacoby, 1908) – Northeast India, Nepal
- Macrocoma sacra (Lopatin, 1983) – Pakistan, Saudi Arabia
- Macrocoma saharica Kocher, 1959 – Morocco
- Macrocoma sarvadensis (Solsky, 1881) – Central Asia
- Macrocoma saudica Medvedev, 1996 – Israel, Saudi Arabia, Egypt (Sinai Peninsula)
- Macrocoma schereri Lopatin, 1995 – Afghanistan
- Macrocoma seriesericans (Fairmaire, 1876) – Algeria
- Macrocoma setosa (H. Lucas, 1846)
  - Macrocoma setosa mesatlantica Kocher, 1959 – Morocco
  - Macrocoma setosa setosa (H. Lucas, 1846) – Algeria
- Macrocoma soror (Weise, 1909)
- Macrocoma spinipes (Reitter, 1889) – Central Asia
- Macrocoma splendens Lindberg, 1950 – Canary Islands
- Macrocoma splendidula (Wollaston, 1862) – Canary Islands
  - Macrocoma splendidula franzi Palm, 1976
  - Macrocoma splendidula palmaensis Palm, 1977
  - Macrocoma splendidula splendidula (Wollaston, 1862)
- Macrocoma substriata (Weise, 1904) – Iran, Turkey
- Macrocoma turbata (Weise, 1909)
- Macrocoma usambarica (Weise, 1906)
- Macrocoma vanharteni Lopatin, 2008 – United Arab Emirates
- Macrocoma vanstraeleni Selman, 1972
- Macrocoma verschureni Selman, 1972
- Macrocoma viridis (Chapuis, 1879)
- Macrocoma voeltzkowi (Weise, 1910)
- Macrocoma zarudnii Lopatin, 1985 – United Arab Emirates, Iran, Oman, Saudi Arabia

Renamed species:

- Macrocoma impressa (Berti & Rapilly, 1973) nec Achard, 1925: renamed to Macrocoma bertiae Moseyko, 2013

Synonyms:

- Macrocoma hormuziaca Warchałowski, 2001: synonym of Macrocoma zarudnii Lopatin, 1985
