= M. carbonaria =

M. carbonaria may refer to one of the following species:

- Macaria carbonaria, the netted mountain moth, a moth species
- Macrocoma carbonaria, a leaf beetle species
- Magdalis carbonaria, a weevil species
- Megachile carbonaria, a bee species
- Mitra carbonaria, a synonym for Isara carbonaria, a sea snail species
