= Schaufuss =

Schaufuss or Schaufuß is a surname. Notable people with the surname include:

- Camillo Schaufuß (1862–1944), German entomologist
- Hans Joachim Schaufuß (1918-1941), German actor
- Hans Hermann Schaufuß (1893-1982), German actor
- Ludwig Wilhelm Schaufuss (1833–1890), German naturalist and entomologist
- Peter Schaufuss (born 1949), Danish ballet dancer
- Puk Schaufuss, born Liselotte Schaufuss, (born 1943), Danish actress
