= Macrocoma splendidula =

Scientific classification
- Kingdom: Animalia
- Phylum: Arthropoda
- Clade: Pancrustacea
- Class: Insecta
- Order: Coleoptera
- Suborder: Polyphaga
- Infraorder: Cucujiformia
- Family: Chrysomelidae
- Genus: Macrocoma
- Species: M. splendidula

Binomial name
- Macrocoma splendidula (Wollaston, 1862)

Synonyms
- sensu stricto: Pseudocolaspis splendidula Wollaston, 1862; franzi: Macrocoma franzi franzi Palm, 1976; Macrocoma occidentalis franzi Palm, 1976; Macrocoma palmaensis franzi Palm, 1976; palmaensis: Macrocoma franzi palmaensis Palm, 1977; Macrocoma franzi officiens Warchalowski, 2001 (unnecessary replacement name); Macrocoma occidentalis Palm, 1976 (nec Escalera, 1914); Macrocoma palmaensis Palm, 1977

Species of beetle

Macrocoma splendidula is a species of leaf beetle endemic to the Canary Islands, described by Thomas Vernon Wollaston in 1862.

== Subspecies ==
There are three subspecies of M. splendidula:

- Macrocoma splendidula franzi Palm, 1976: It is found on El Hierro, and is dedicated to Dr. Herbert Franz.
- Macrocoma splendidula palmaensis Palm, 1977: It is found on La Palma. It was originally named Macrocoma occidentalis by Palm in 1976, but it was pointed out the species name was already used by Escalera in 1914 (Pseudocolaspis occidentalis, now Macrocoma henoni occidentalis), so it was renamed to M. palmaensis the following year.
- Macrocoma splendidula splendidula (Wollaston, 1862): The nominotypical subspecies. It is found on Gran Canaria and Tenerife.
