= Cynoglossum troodi =

Scientific classification
- Kingdom: Plantae
- Clade: Tracheophytes
- Clade: Angiosperms
- Clade: Eudicots
- Clade: Asterids
- Order: Boraginales
- Family: Boraginaceae
- Genus: Cynoglossum
- Species: C. troodi

Binomial name
- Cynoglossum troodi H. Lindberg

Species of flowering plant

Cynoglossum troodi, Troodos hound's tongue is an erect, perennial herb, 10–25 cm high, with branched stems covered with stiff hairs. Leaves alternate, simple, entire, stalkless, oblong to lanceolate, densely hairy, the basal in tufts, 2-5 x 0.5–1 cm, the upper sparse and smaller. Flowers actinomorphic in cymose inflorescences, very small, corolla brick-red, tubular, 5-lobed. Flowers May–August. Fruit of 4 nutlets with rigid spinules.

== Habitat ==
In Pinus nigra ssp. pallasiana and Juniperus foetidissima forests on serpentine in Troödos forest at 1500–1950 m altitude.

== Distribution ==
Endemic to Cyprus, common on the higher parts of the Troödos forest, Khionistra, Prodromos, Chromion, Troödos square and Kryos Potamos.
