= Macrocoma aeneonigra =

Scientific classification
- Kingdom: Animalia
- Phylum: Arthropoda
- Clade: Pancrustacea
- Class: Insecta
- Order: Coleoptera
- Suborder: Polyphaga
- Infraorder: Cucujiformia
- Family: Chrysomelidae
- Genus: Macrocoma
- Species: M. aeneonigra

Binomial name
- Macrocoma aeneonigra (Fairmaire, 1873)

Synonyms
- Pseudocolaspis aeneonigra Fairmaire, 1873

Species of beetle

Macrocoma aeneonigra is a species of leaf beetle from Algeria. It was first described by Léon Fairmaire in 1873 from a single specimen, as a species of Pachnephorus, and is probably a dwarf form of Macrocoma leprieuri.
