= Macrocoma latifrons =

Scientific classification
- Kingdom: Animalia
- Phylum: Arthropoda
- Clade: Pancrustacea
- Class: Insecta
- Order: Coleoptera
- Suborder: Polyphaga
- Infraorder: Cucujiformia
- Family: Chrysomelidae
- Genus: Macrocoma
- Species: M. latifrons

Binomial name
- Macrocoma latifrons Lindberg, 1953

Synonyms
- Macrocoma vicina Lindberg i.l.

Species of beetle

Macrocoma latifrons is a species of leaf beetle endemic to the Canary Islands. It was first described by Harald Lindberg in 1953. It is found on Tenerife.
