= Macrocoma splendens =

Scientific classification
- Kingdom: Animalia
- Phylum: Arthropoda
- Clade: Pancrustacea
- Class: Insecta
- Order: Coleoptera
- Suborder: Polyphaga
- Infraorder: Cucujiformia
- Family: Chrysomelidae
- Genus: Macrocoma
- Species: M. splendens

Binomial name
- Macrocoma splendens Lindberg, 1950

Species of beetle

Macrocoma splendens is a species of leaf beetle endemic to the Canary Islands. It was first described by Harald Lindberg in 1950. It is reported from Tenerife, La Palma and La Gomera.
