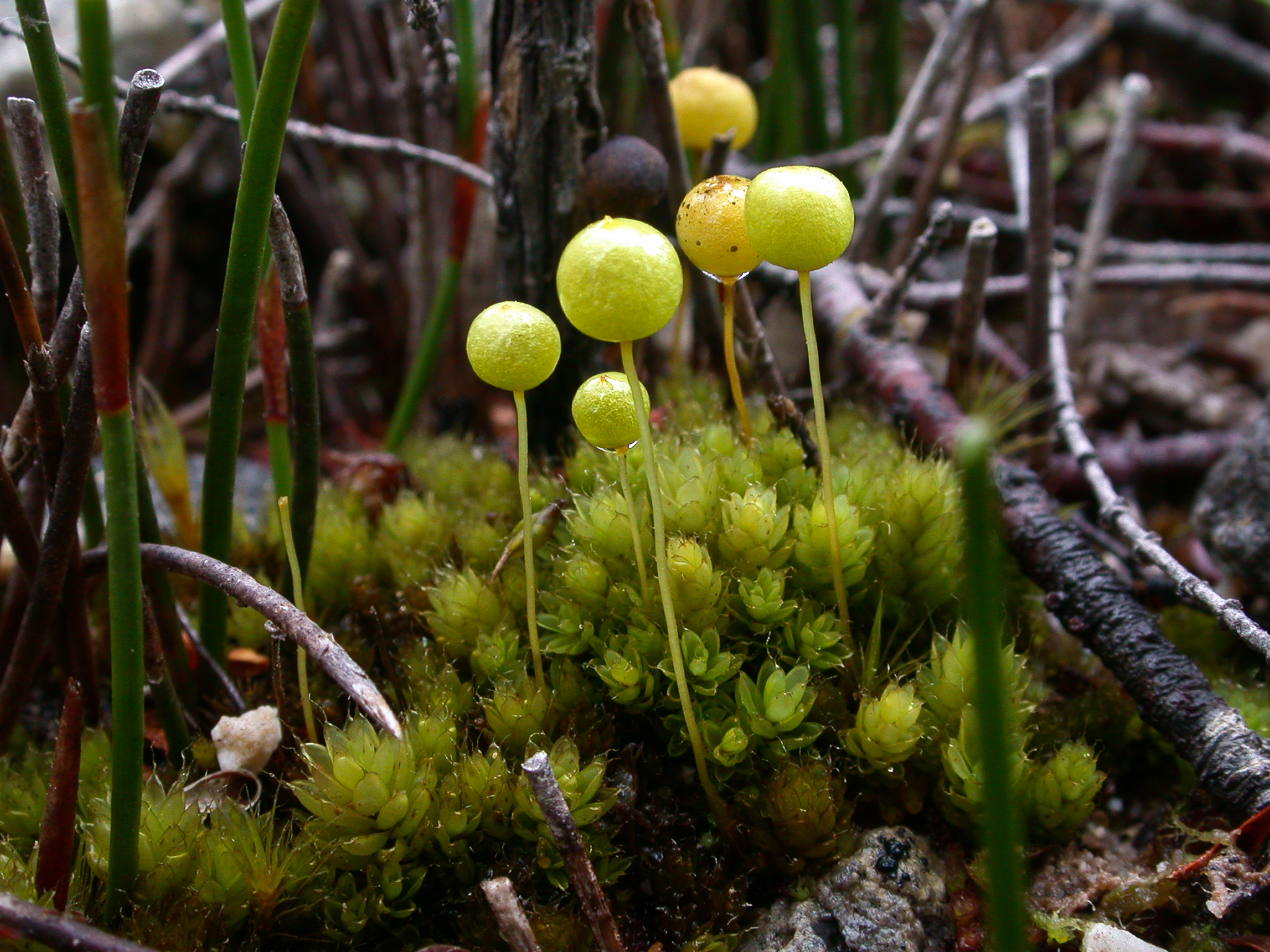
- P. grandiblogum, growing on the subalpine buttongrass moorlands along Gelignite creek, Scotts Peak Dam Road

Scientific classification
- Kingdom: Plantae
- Division: Bryophyta
- Class: Bryopsida
- Subclass: Dicranidae
- Order: Pleurophascales
- Family: Pleurophascaceae
- Genus: Pleurophascum
- Species: P. grandiglobum

Binomial name
- Pleurophascum grandiglobum Lindb.

= Pleurophascum grandiglobum =

Species of moss

Pleurophascum grandiglobum is a moss endemic to Tasmania, Australia, and was first noted by S. O. Lindberg in 1875 for its peculiar form of cleistocarpous capsule, erect growth form, lateral perichaetia, and ecostate leaves. Its exceedingly large, inoperculate, and often brightly coloured capsules captured the heart of the 19th-century Scandinavian bryologist, who considered the moss to be "of no less interest to the Museologist than is Rafflesia or Welwitschia to the Phanerogamist". The species currently belongs to a monogeneric family Pleurophascaceae that is found only in temperate Australasia and includes three different species. Pleurophascum ovalifolium, heretofore known as P. grandiglobum var. decurrens, is the New Zealand taxon while the last remaining member of the genus, Pleurophascum occidentale, occurs only in Western Australia.

The relationship between P. grandiglobum and P. ovalifolium has been puzzling botanists such as Sainsbury for more than 50 years, and it was not until recently (around 2005) that the New Zealand representative, which was restricted to the vicinity of Mt Arthur on the western coast of South Island, was recognised and given a new name. Probably the most discerning features of P. ovalifolium that separates it from P. grandiglobum are its distally erect leaf margins and bright orange-red capsules that become strongly discoid when mature (P. grandiglobum has a recurved distal leaf margin and orange-green capsules when mature).

P. occidentale, on the other hand, is only found along coastal heaths in the southwest of Western Australia and has dramatically different morphological characteristics compared to its two congeners . These features include: (1) sexual organs borne terminally on secondary stems and branching that is predominantly (or exclusively) by subperigonial and subperichaetial innovation (in both P. grandiglobum and P. ovalifolium inflorescences of both sexes occur on lateral branches and lack true innovations); (2) absence of stomata at the capsule base; and (3) very short setae and short-exserted capsules and suggest a longer period of isolation than between its cousins.

The name Pleurophascum originates from the Greek word pleuron, meaning lateral, whereas phascon refers to an indeterminate cryptogam, and together they describe the capsules of P. grandiglobum arising from short, lateral branches.

== Taxonomy ==
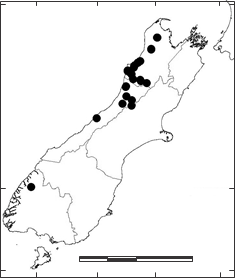
Distribution of P. ovalifolium in New Zealand _{This picture was taken with consent from P. J. Dalton and his article A reconsideration of Pleurophascum (Musci: Pleurophascaceae) and specific status for a New Zealand endemic, Pleurophascum ovalifolium stat. et nom. nov.}

Following the initial discovery of P. grandiglobum by Lindberg in 1875, Pleurophascum was believed to be a monotypic genus restricted to Tasmania for approximately 75 years. It contains three species, two, Pleurophascum grandiglobum and Pleurophascum occidentale, which are endemic to Australia and one, Pleurophascum ovalifolium, is only found on the west of the great Divide in South Island, New Zealand. Brotherus (1924) placed the genus Pleurophascum in its own suborder Pleurophascineae within the Dicranales, highlighting its characteristic ecostate leaves, the lateral placement of its sex organs, and its large, spherical, and cleistocarpous capsules with immersed stomata. In 1984, Vitt proposed to place Pleurophascum in a monotypic family Pleurophascaceae within the suborder Dicranineae while Buck and Goffinet (2000) suggested that it be placed within the Bryaceae or, possibly the Pottiaceae according to molecular and morphological studies. The ordinal and familial allocation of genus Pleurophascum thus remains as one of Australasia's bryological curiosities and is still open to debate, with molecular techniques and ontogenetic studies perhaps being the most suitable means of unlocking its mystery.

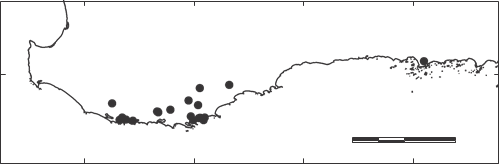
Distribution of P. occidentale in Western Australia _{This picture was taken with consent from P. J. Dalton and his article A reconsideration of Pleurophascum (Musci: Pleurophascaceae) and specific status for a New Zealand endemic, Pleurophascum ovalifolium stat. et nom. nov.}

== Description ==
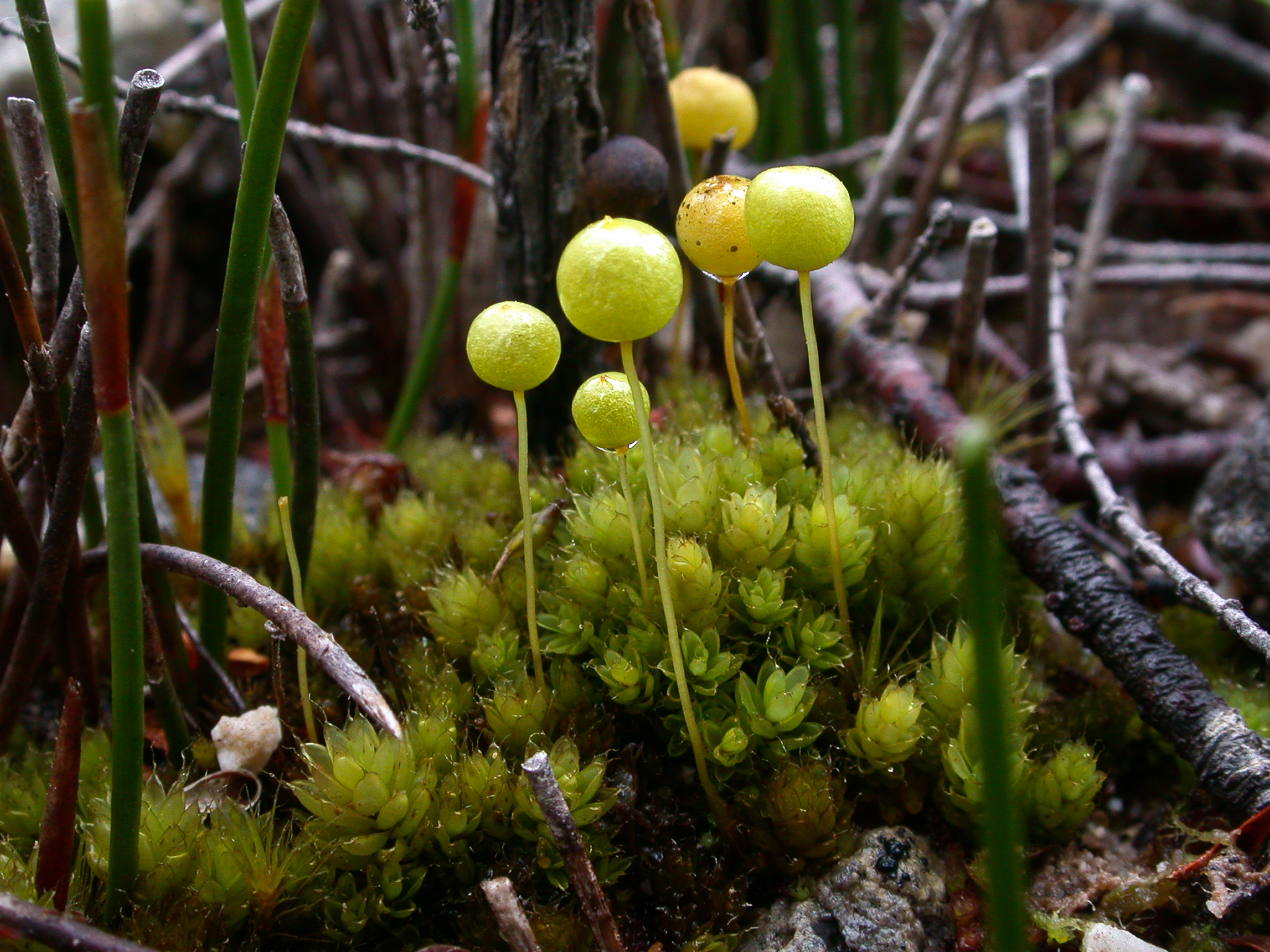
Closer lookup of P. grandiglobum _{This picture was taken by R. J. Wiltshire, who has kindly given consent to share this picture}

P. grandiglobum is a comose, medium-sized to robust moss with shoots that are approximately 10 mm tall, solitary or in loose colonies, bright yellow-green above and dark brown below . The primary stem grows underground in a creeping fashion while sparse lateral branches and pale, smooth rhizoids grow from secondary branches. Its on-decurrent, costaless leaves are deeply concave, blunt or apiculate, and crowded at stem apices, forming elongate comae in fertile plants. Leaf margins are slightly recurved above or nearly to the leaf base and entire or with a few irregular teeth. The perichaetia borne on lateral branches surrounds several archegonia mixed with uniseriate paraphyses, and upon fertilisation, swells to 5–7 mm long. The perigonia is also scattered on short lateral branches found on secondary stems, enclosing up to 70 short antheridia and uniseriate paraphyses. The large, globose capsule is unmistakable when present and is held suspended on a long setae 18–25 mm in length, with the capsule itself being 2.6-4.9 mm in diameter. At the apex of the inoperculate capsule is a small apiculus which is the calyptra perched atop as a tiny beak . At the base of the capsule there is an abundance of stomata present. Capsules generally mature between spring to late-autumn, changing from pale green to orange and splitting open at the side to release smooth, oval spores 35-57 μm in diameter. Its broad altitudinal range probably contributed to the extended fruiting period. The capsules of P. grandiglobum are always globuse and never transition into a bright orange-red discoid as do the mature capsules of P. ovalifolium .

== Distribution and habitat ==
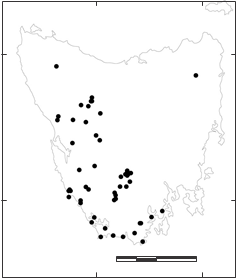
Distribution of P. grandiglobum in Tasmania _{This picture was taken with consent from P. J. Dalton and his article A reconsideration of Pleurophascum (Musci: Pleurophascaceae) and specific status for a New Zealand endemic, Pleurophascum ovalifolium stat. et nom. nov.}

P. grandiglobum can be found throughout the west, southwest, and central highlands of Tasmania, extending up to the Neasey Plains in the northwest and down to Mt Esperance and Birch Inlet in the southeast.

This spectacular, terrestrial moss is only known to inhabit the wet or boggy soils on the subalpine Tasmanian button-grass (Gymnoschoenus sphaerocephalus) moorlands, where sea level is around 1400 m. In the southwest, the species seemingly favour peaty to gravelly quartzitic substrates while at higher elevations it often grows in wet flushes amongst other bryophytes (particularly Campylopus introflexus), or in boggy sedgelands dominated by Gleichenia alpina, Astelia alpina, and the Sprengelia incarnate.

Despite being widespread in Tasmania, P. grandiglobum is endemic to the island and its global distribution may be an indication of poor dispersal mechanism. Dalton and Jones frequently noted that its capsules were frequently grazed or eroded prior to maturity, and persisting, mature capsules between one summer and another are rare. A wombat was proposed as a possible native grazer, though the exact herbivore and whether it affects the dispersal of the species remains to be resolved

== Pleurophascaceae characteristics ==
This family of moss is either comose or hoary and forms loose, yellow- or brown-green turves or cushions. It has a creeping, subterranean primary stem with pale rhizoids and scale-like leaves while its glossy secondary stem is erect, laterally branched and usually amentaceous. Its ecostate leaves are broadly elliptic to nearly cochleariform, strongly concave, appressed or erect-spreading, occasionally slightly decurrent; margins erect or narrowly recurved, entire or toothed, and are densely packed at stem apices.

Pleurophascaceae is a dioecious moss with its perichaetia and gemmiform perigonia borne on short, lateral branches arising from the secondary stems, or in the case of P. occidentale, terminal on secondary stems. In P. occidentale, the perichaetia is also overtopped by subtending innovation that may or may not expand after fertilisation. The setae found within the genus are erect, smooth, elongate or very short, and serve to uphold the very large, inoperculate capsules that are globose, discoid or obovoid (depending on the species), and bluntly rostrate or rounded at the apex. Stomata are either present or absent at the base of the cleistocarpous (Fife and Dalton, 2005). The calyptra is smooth, cucullate, and soon deciduous, releasing large, smooth spores

== Comparison of the Pleurophascum taxa ==
Table 1. Gametophytic and distributional comparison of Pleurophascum taxa.
	P. grandiglobum	P. ovalifolium	P. occidentale
Upper leaf margins	Recurved, often nearly to leaf base	Erect (leaves strongly concave)	Recurved, nearly to leaf base
Leaf apex shape and pigmentation of well-developed leaves	Mostly piliferous or mucronate, less often acute or rounded; concolorous	Broadly rounded; concolorous	Well-developed hair-point; hoary
Reflexion and toothing of leaf apex	Reflexed; entire or with a few irregular teeth	Never reflexed, entire	Reflexed, serrate
Perigonial position and presence of subperigonial innovations	Lateral, gemmiform; no innovations	Lateral, gemmiform; no innovations	Terminal; subtended by innovations
Perichaetial position and presence of subperichaetial innovations	On short lateral branches; no innovations	On short lateral branches; no innovations	Terminal; subtended by innovations
Geographic distribution	Tasmania	New Zealand (South Island)	Western Australia

Table 2. Sporophytic comparison of Pleurophascum taxa.
	P. grandiglobum	P. ovalifolium	P. occidentale
Seta length	Elongate, >18 mm	Elongate, >10 mm	Short, c. 1 mm
Mature capsule shape, colour, and diameter	Globose, dull- or brown-orange, 2.6–4.9 mm diam.	Discoid, bright orange or red, mostly 6–12 mm diam.	Broadly obovoid, pale orange, c. 2–3 mm diam.
Capsule apical rostrum presence and length	Present, 0.2–0.35 mm	Present, 0.6–0.9 mm	Absent
Stomata	Present	Present	Absent
Columella	Conspicuous in spore sac	Conspicuous in spore sac	Present, inconspicuous
Spore diameter	35–57 μm	33–45 μm	45–78 μm (immature)
Calyptra	Cucullate, dark brown, c. 3 mm	Cucullate, dark brown, c. 3–4 mm	Unknown

_{Acknowledgement: Table 1 & 2 were abstracted from the journal article A reconsideration of Pleurophascum (Musci : Pleurophascaceae) and specific status for a New Zealand endemic, Pleurophascum ovalifolium stat. et nom. nov. with author P. J. Dalton's consent.}

== Related species and their distribution ==
- P. ovalifolium
- P. occidentale
