= Macrocoma cylindrica =

Scientific classification
- Kingdom: Animalia
- Phylum: Arthropoda
- Clade: Pancrustacea
- Class: Insecta
- Order: Coleoptera
- Suborder: Polyphaga
- Infraorder: Cucujiformia
- Family: Chrysomelidae
- Genus: Macrocoma
- Species: M. cylindrica

Binomial name
- Macrocoma cylindrica (Küster, 1846)

Synonyms
- Pachnephorus cylindricus Küster, 1846

Species of leaf beetle

Macrocoma cylindrica is a species of leaf beetle found in southern Spain. It was first described by Heinrich Carl Küster in 1846, as a species of Pachnephorus. A subspecies or variety of the species later described from Morocco, M. c. vaucheri, is now considered a synonym of Macrocoma setosa.
