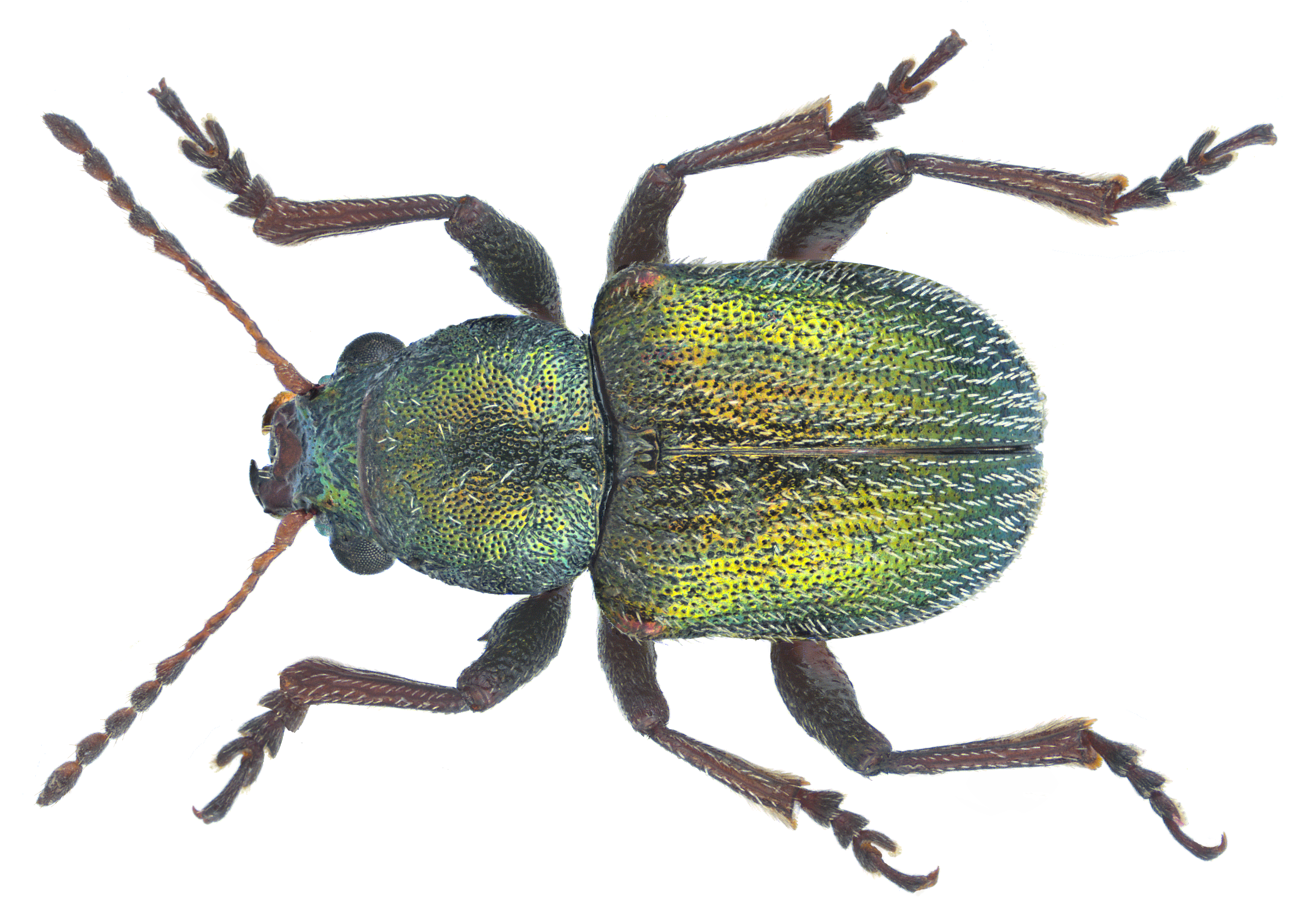
- Macrocoma rubripes male

Scientific classification
- Kingdom: Animalia
- Phylum: Arthropoda
- Clade: Pancrustacea
- Class: Insecta
- Order: Coleoptera
- Suborder: Polyphaga
- Infraorder: Cucujiformia
- Family: Chrysomelidae
- Genus: Macrocoma
- Species: M. rubripes

Binomial name
- Macrocoma rubripes (Schaufuss, 1862)

Synonyms
- Eubrachys balcanicus Apfelbeck, 1912; Pachnephorus aeneus Walker, 1871; ?Pseudocolaspis anatolica Pic, 1898; Pseudocolaspis diversicolor Schaufuss, 1871; Pseudocolaspis graeca Lefèvre, 1876; Pseudocolaspis rubripes Schaufuss, 1862

= Macrocoma rubripes =

Species of beetle

Macrocoma rubripes is a species of leaf beetle from Europe, Asia and possibly North Africa. It was first described by Ludwig Wilhelm Schaufuss in 1862, as a species of Pseudocolaspis.

== Subspecies ==
There are two subspecies of M. rubripes:

- Macrocoma rubripes rubripes: The nominotypical subspecies. It is distributed in the Balkan Peninsula, Cyprus, Turkey, Syria and the Caucasus. It has also been reported from Saudi Arabia, Egypt, Libya, and Algeria.
- Macrocoma rubripes turkmena Lopatin, 1976: Found in Turkmenistan.

Some authors recognise a third subspecies, Macrocoma rubripes balcanica (Apfelbeck, 1912), distributed in Bulgaria and Northern Dobruja.
