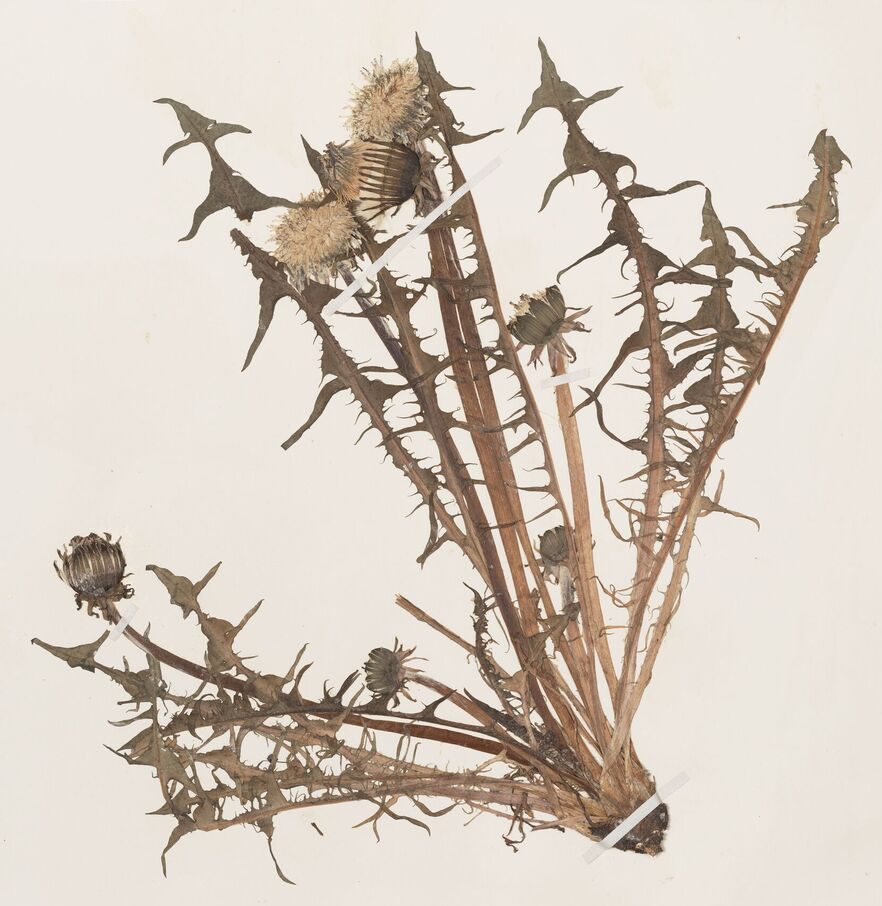

Scientific classification
- Kingdom: Plantae
- Clade: Tracheophytes
- Clade: Angiosperms
- Clade: Eudicots
- Clade: Asterids
- Order: Asterales
- Family: Asteraceae
- Genus: Taraxacum
- Species: T. angustisectum

Binomial name
- Taraxacum angustisectum H.Lindb.
- Range of Taraxacum angustisectum

= Taraxacum angustisectum =

Species of flowering plant

Taraxacum angustisectum is a species of perennial herbaceous plant in the family Asteraceae. It is classified within the section Erythrosperma of the genus Taraxacum, which comprises a large group of closely related dandelion species. The species is native to Finland and parts of northwestern and northern European Russia, where it typically inhabits temperate, open, and grassy environments. T. angustisectum was first formally described in 1944 by the Finnish botanist Harald Lindberg, based on material collected in northern Finland and published in Exsiccatae Florae Fennicae.

== Description ==
Taraxacum angustisectum is a low-growing species with narrowly divided, slender leaves and uncolored petioles. The flower head is slightly convex, measuring around 32 mm in diameter. The involucre is about 16 mm tall and has a glaucescent (bluish-green) hue. Outer involucral bracts are approximately 12 mm long and 3–5 mm wide, spreading irregularly. They are distinctively white-margined and often tinged with violet or green. The inner bracts are upright, dark-colored, and feature prominent horn-like projections.

The flower itself is pale yellow, with the outermost (marginal) florets about 2 mm wide and showing a dark violet coloration on the underside. The stigmas are sterile, lacking pollen. The fruit, or achene, is ovoid in shape and reddish brown in color.

== Distribution and habitat ==
Taraxacum angustisectum has been recorded in Finland, particularly in the regions of Kainuu and Inari Lapland, and is lectotypified from material collected in Inari. Historical Finnish collections also document the species in the Viborg area, including Kolikkoinmäki, Nuoraa, and Uuraansaari near present-day Vysotsk. In Russia, the species is accepted in southern Karelia and the southwestern parts of northwestern Russia, such as the Leningrad, Pskov, and Novgorod regions. Although it is listed in several regional floras, herbarium specimens confirming its presence are limited, and it is notably absent from collections at the Komarov Botanical Institute.

The plant typically occurs in open, grassy areas and sunlit environments with low competition from taller vegetation. It favors well-drained soils and is often found in semi-natural or disturbed habitats, such as roadsides, meadows, and the edges of cultivated lands. The species can also be grown in botanical gardens and other cultivated settings.
