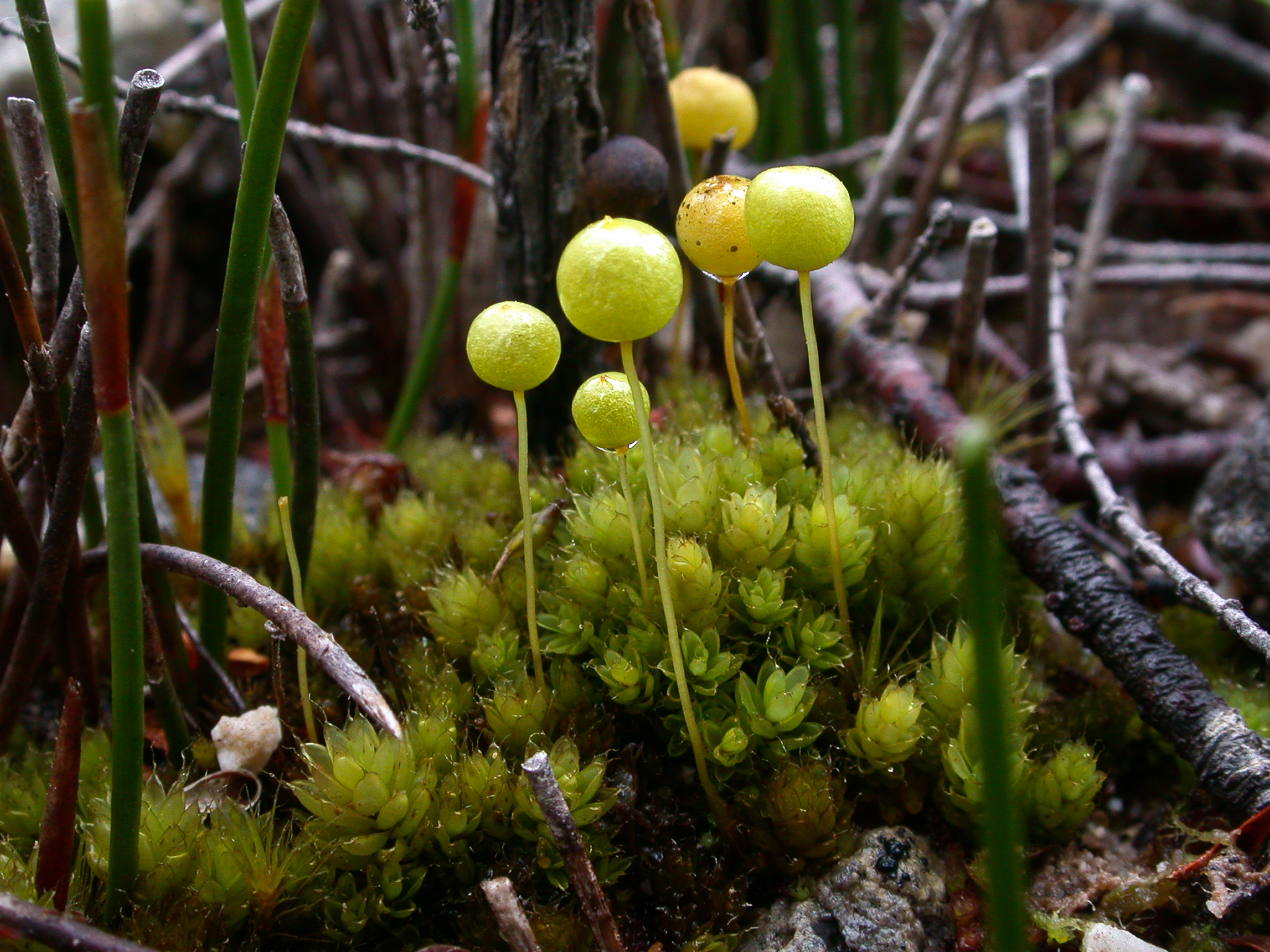
- Pleurophascum grandiglobum, growing on the subalpine buttongrass moorlands along Gelignite creek, Scotts Peak Dam Road

Scientific classification
- Kingdom: Plantae
- Clade: Embryophytes
- Division: Bryophyta
- Class: Bryopsida
- Subclass: Dicranidae
- Order: Pleurophascales
- Family: Pleurophascaceae; Broth.
- Genus: Pleurophascum; Lindb.

Species
- 3 species (see text)

= Pleurophascum =

Genus of haplolepideous mosses

Pleurophascum is a genus of haplolepideous mosses (Dicranidae) in the monotypic family Pleurophascaceae. The family was previously placed in the order Pottiales, but is now placed in its own monotypic order, Pleurophascales.

== Species ==
Three species are recognised:

- Pleurophascum grandiglobum Lindb.
- Pleurophascum occidentale R.E. Wyatt & A.H. Stoneb.
- Pleurophascum ovalifolium Fife & Dalton
