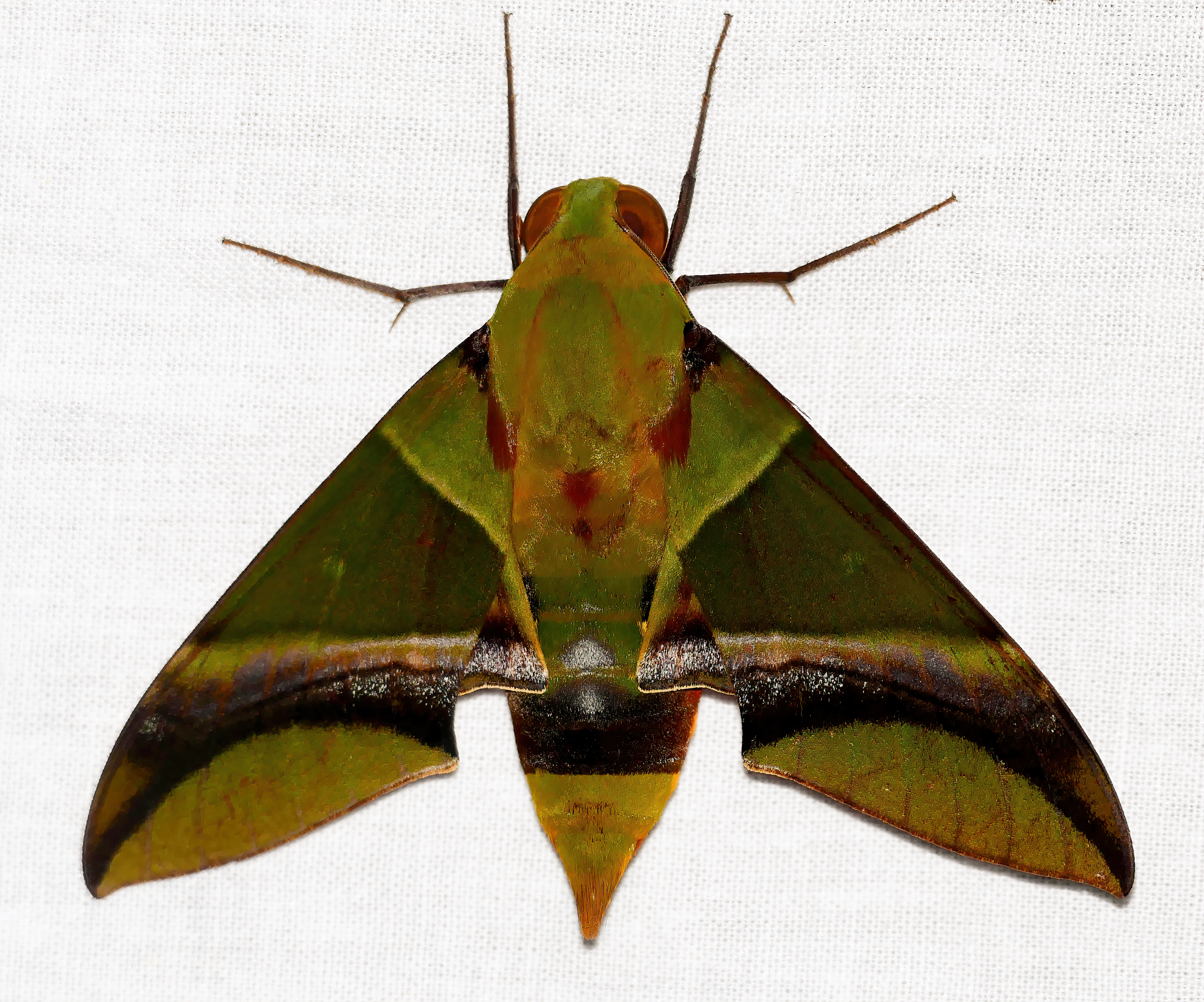
- Male dorsal view

Scientific classification
- Domain: Eukaryota
- Kingdom: Animalia
- Phylum: Arthropoda
- Class: Insecta
- Order: Lepidoptera
- Family: Sphingidae
- Genus: Oryba
- Species: O. kadeni

Binomial name
- Oryba kadeni (Schaufuss, 1870)

Synonyms
- Pachylia kadeni Schaufuss, 1870; Clanis imperialis H. Druce, 1883

= Oryba kadeni =

Species of moth

Oryba kadeni is a moth of the family Sphingidae first described by Schaufuss in 1870.

== Distribution ==
It is found from Central America (including Guatemala, Costa Rica, Panama and possibly Belize) to Brazil, Bolivia, Ecuador, Peru, Venezuela and French Guiana.

== Description ==
The wingspan is 102–116 mm. It is a large, heavy-bodied and large-eyed species with a bright green upperside and orange underside. The marginal band of the forewing upperside is strongly convex. Females have forewings which are much more rounded than those of the males.

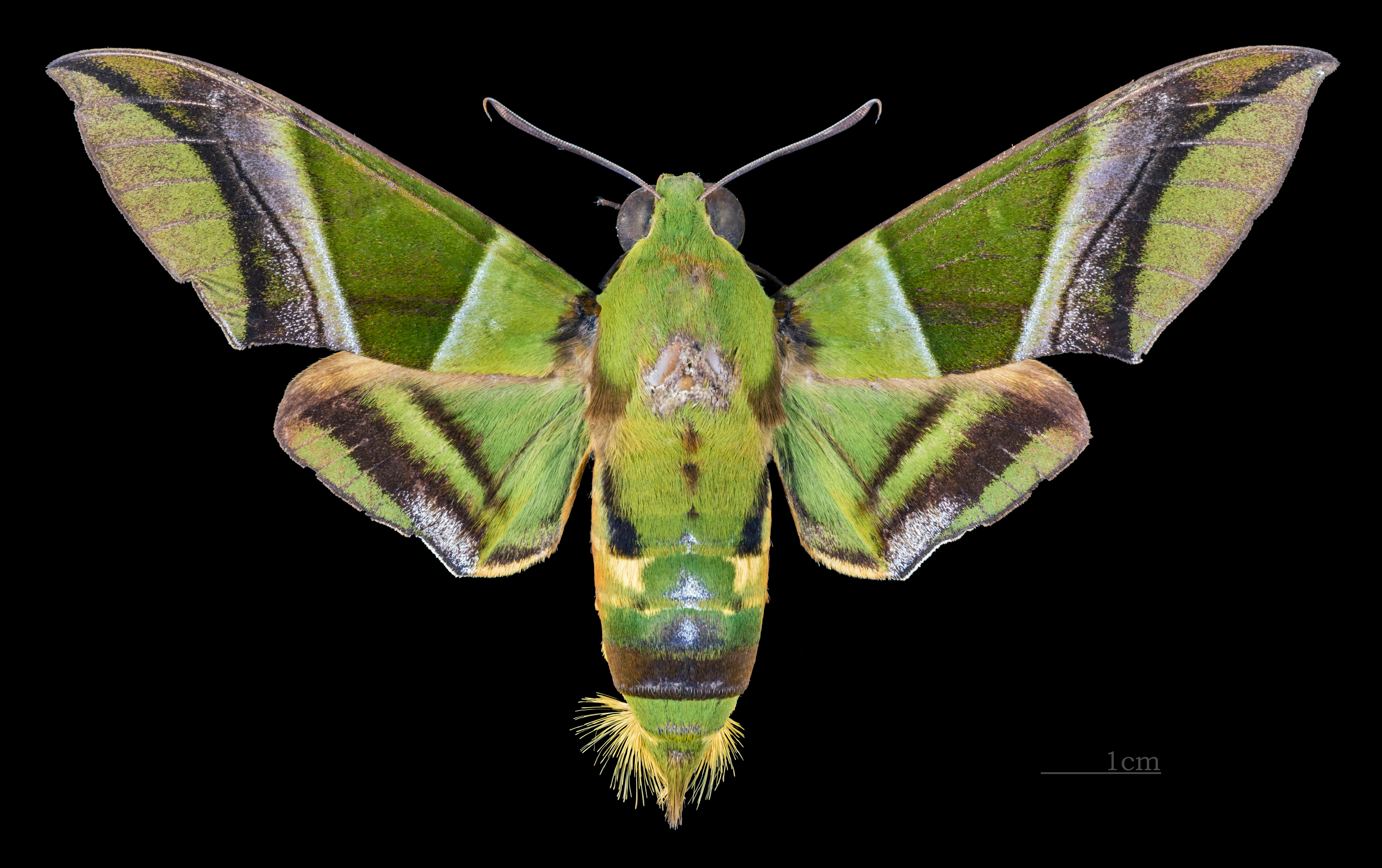
Oryba kadeni ♂

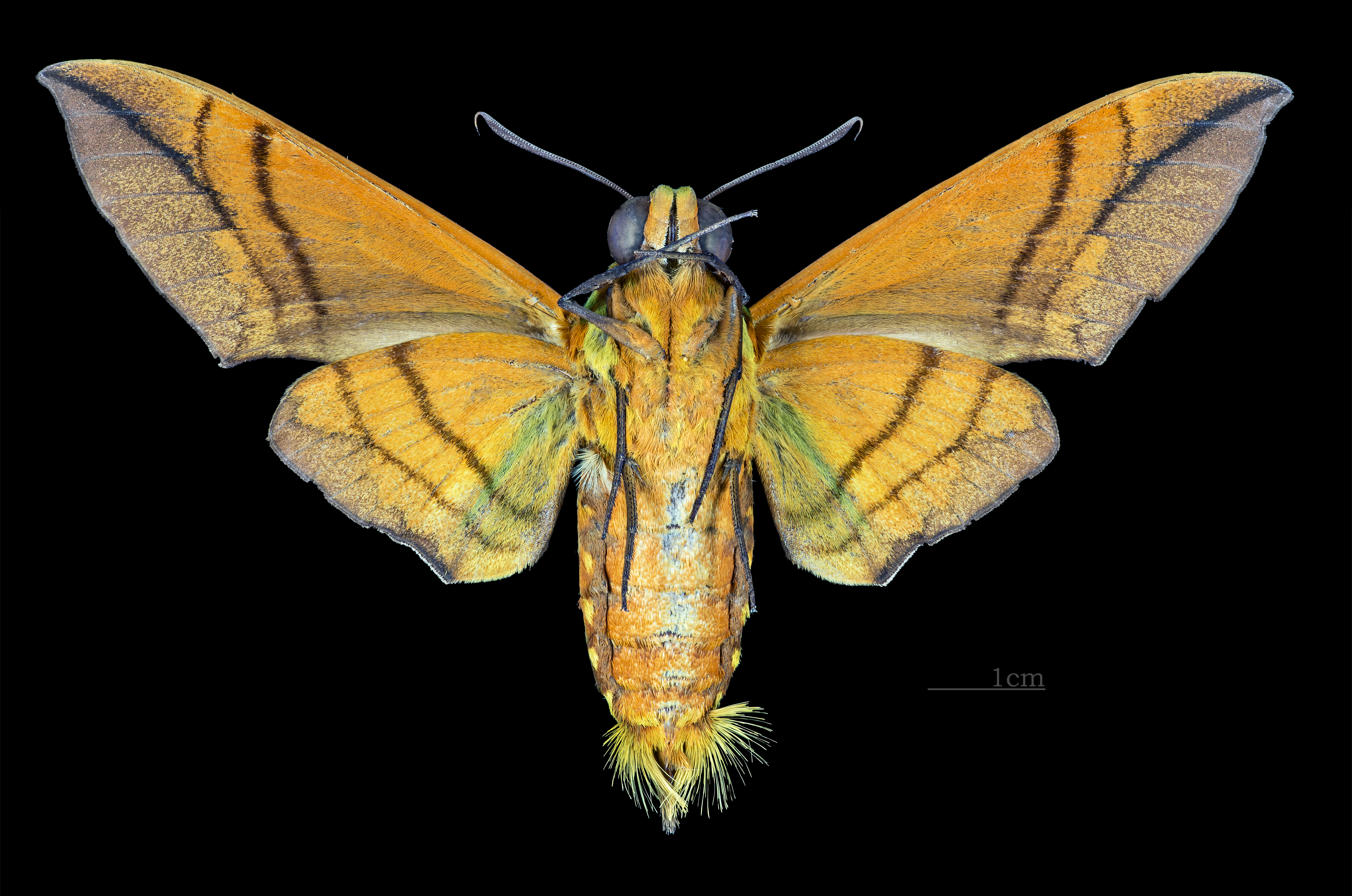
Oryba kadeni ♂ △

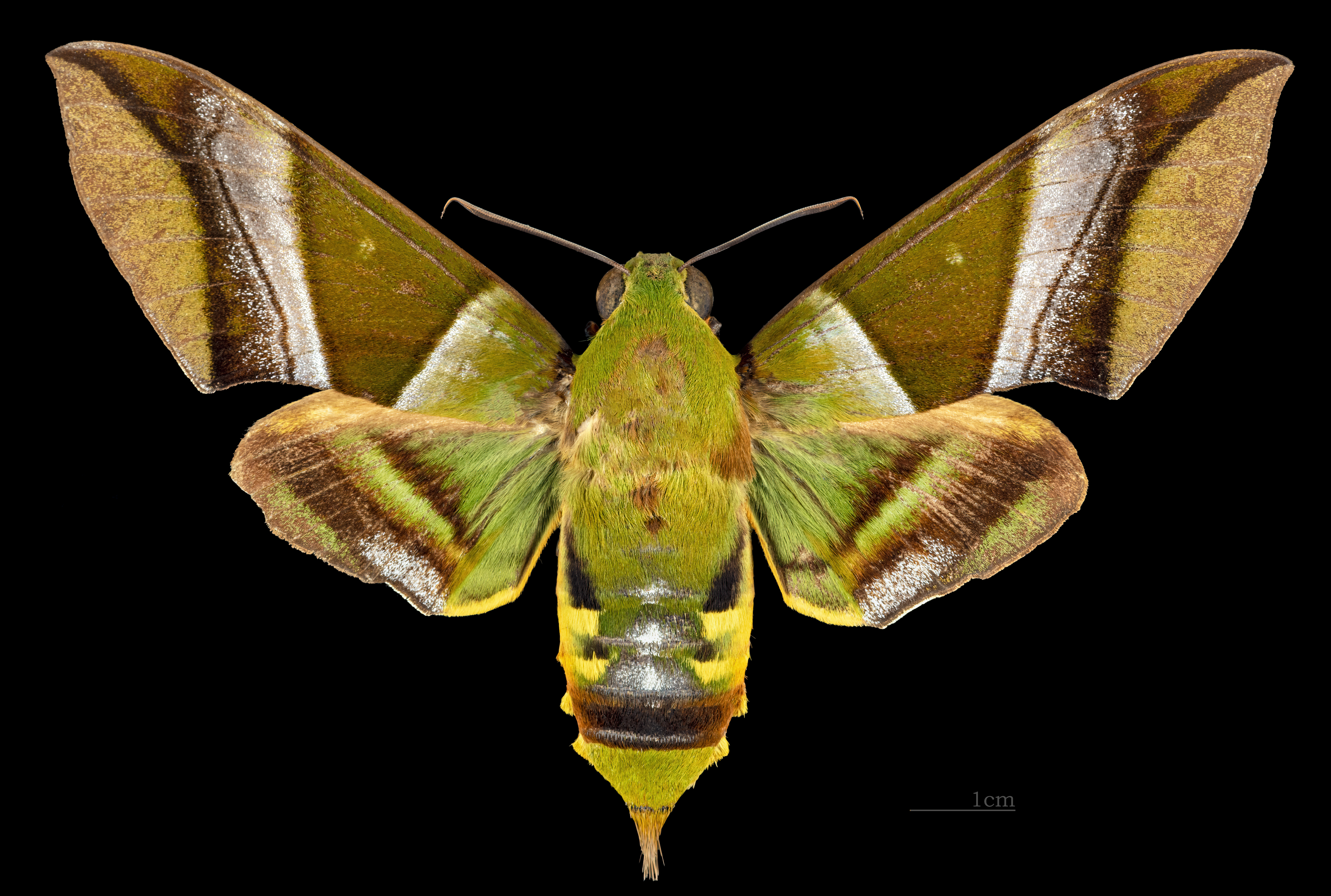
Oryba kadeni ♀

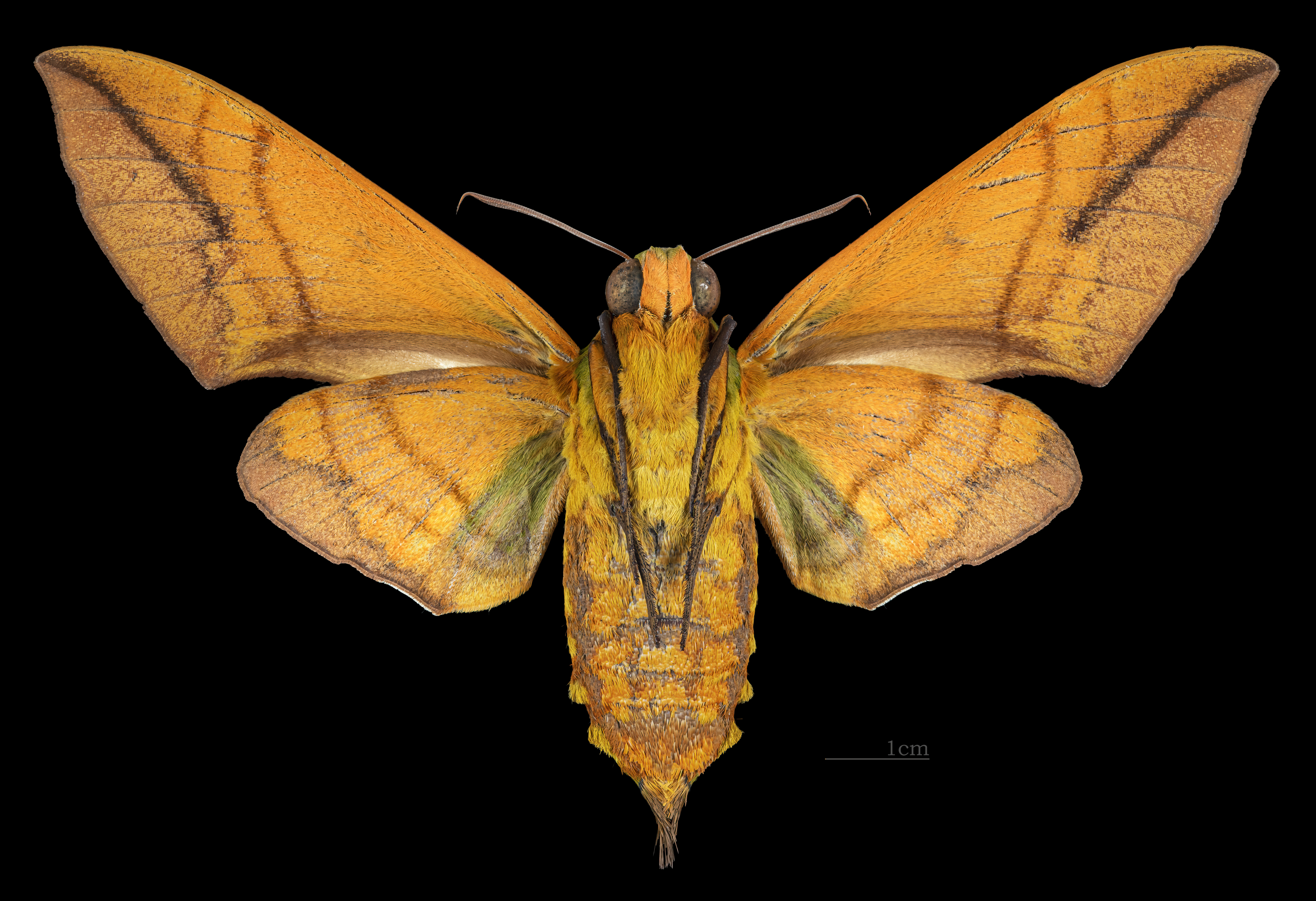
Oryba kadeni ♀ △

== Biology ==
There are probably multiple generations per year.

The larvae feed on Isertia laevis.
