= Macrocoma haiensis =

Scientific classification
- Kingdom: Animalia
- Phylum: Arthropoda
- Clade: Pancrustacea
- Class: Insecta
- Order: Coleoptera
- Suborder: Polyphaga
- Infraorder: Cucujiformia
- Family: Chrysomelidae
- Genus: Macrocoma
- Species: M. haiensis

Binomial name
- Macrocoma haiensis Kocher, 1967

Species of beetle

Macrocoma haiensis is a species of leaf beetle of Morocco, described by Louis Kocher in 1967.
