= Macrocoma heydeni =

Scientific classification
- Kingdom: Animalia
- Phylum: Arthropoda
- Clade: Pancrustacea
- Class: Insecta
- Order: Coleoptera
- Suborder: Polyphaga
- Infraorder: Cucujiformia
- Family: Chrysomelidae
- Genus: Macrocoma
- Species: M. heydeni

Binomial name
- Macrocoma heydeni (Lefèvre, 1876)

Synonyms
- Pseudocolaspis heydeni Lefèvre, 1876

Species of beetle

Macrocoma heydeni is a species of leaf beetle of Morocco, described by Édouard Lefèvre in 1876.
