= Macrocoma vanharteni =

Scientific classification
- Kingdom: Animalia
- Phylum: Arthropoda
- Clade: Pancrustacea
- Class: Insecta
- Order: Coleoptera
- Suborder: Polyphaga
- Infraorder: Cucujiformia
- Family: Chrysomelidae
- Genus: Macrocoma
- Species: M. vanharteni

Binomial name
- Macrocoma vanharteni Lopatin, 2008

Species of beetle

Macrocoma vanharteni is a species of leaf beetle of the United Arab Emirates, described by Igor Lopatin in 2008.
