= Macrocoma melillensis =

Scientific classification
- Kingdom: Animalia
- Phylum: Arthropoda
- Clade: Pancrustacea
- Class: Insecta
- Order: Coleoptera
- Suborder: Polyphaga
- Infraorder: Cucujiformia
- Family: Chrysomelidae
- Genus: Macrocoma
- Species: M. melillensis

Binomial name
- Macrocoma melillensis Kocher, 1967

Species of beetle

Macrocoma melillensis is a species of leaf beetle of Morocco, described by Louis Kocher in 1967. It is possibly a synonym of Macrocoma leprieuri leprieuri.
