= Macrocoma divisa =

Scientific classification
- Kingdom: Animalia
- Phylum: Arthropoda
- Clade: Pancrustacea
- Class: Insecta
- Order: Coleoptera
- Suborder: Polyphaga
- Infraorder: Cucujiformia
- Family: Chrysomelidae
- Genus: Macrocoma
- Species: M. divisa

Binomial name
- Macrocoma divisa (Wollaston, 1864)

Synonyms
- Pseudocolaspis divisa Wollaston, 1864

Species of beetle

Macrocoma divisa is a species of leaf beetle endemic to the Canary Islands. It was first described by Thomas Vernon Wollaston in 1864 as a species of Pseudocolaspis. It has been reported from Lanzarote, Fuerteventura and Graciosa.
