= Macrocoma minutula =

Scientific classification
- Kingdom: Animalia
- Phylum: Arthropoda
- Clade: Pancrustacea
- Class: Insecta
- Order: Coleoptera
- Suborder: Polyphaga
- Infraorder: Cucujiformia
- Family: Chrysomelidae
- Genus: Macrocoma
- Species: M. minutula

Binomial name
- Macrocoma minutula (Fairmaire, 1887)

Synonyms
- Pseudocolaspis minutula Fairmaire, 1887

Species of beetle

Macrocoma minutula is a species of leaf beetle found in Tanzania and the Democratic Republic of the Congo. It was first described by the French entomologist Léon Fairmaire in 1887.
