= Macrocoma bezdeki =

Scientific classification
- Kingdom: Animalia
- Phylum: Arthropoda
- Clade: Pancrustacea
- Class: Insecta
- Order: Coleoptera
- Suborder: Polyphaga
- Infraorder: Cucujiformia
- Family: Chrysomelidae
- Genus: Macrocoma
- Species: M. bezdeki

Binomial name
- Macrocoma bezdeki Zoia, 2012

Species of beetle

Macrocoma bezdeki is a species of leaf beetle endemic to Socotra. It was described by Stefano Zoia in 2012. It is named after Jan Bezděk, a collector of the specimens studied and also a specialist in the leaf beetle subfamily Galerucinae.
