= Macrocoma lefevrei =

Scientific classification
- Kingdom: Animalia
- Phylum: Arthropoda
- Clade: Pancrustacea
- Class: Insecta
- Order: Coleoptera
- Suborder: Polyphaga
- Infraorder: Cucujiformia
- Family: Chrysomelidae
- Genus: Macrocoma
- Species: M. lefevrei

Binomial name
- Macrocoma lefevrei (Baly, 1878)

Synonyms
- Pseudocolaspis lefevrei Baly, 1878; Pseudocolaspis lefevrei var. decemlineatus Pic, 1903

Species of beetle

Macrocoma lefevrei is a species of leaf beetle of Saudi Arabia, Oman, Yemen, Iran and Egypt. It was first described by Joseph Sugar Baly in 1878.
