= Macrocoma niedobovae =

Scientific classification
- Kingdom: Animalia
- Phylum: Arthropoda
- Clade: Pancrustacea
- Class: Insecta
- Order: Coleoptera
- Suborder: Polyphaga
- Infraorder: Cucujiformia
- Family: Chrysomelidae
- Genus: Macrocoma
- Species: M. niedobovae

Binomial name
- Macrocoma niedobovae Zoia, 2012

Species of beetle

Macrocoma niedobovae is a species of leaf beetle endemic to Socotra. It was described by Stefano Zoia in 2012. It is named in honor of Jana Niedobová, who collected some of the specimens that were studied.
