= Macrocoma buettikeriana =

Scientific classification
- Kingdom: Animalia
- Phylum: Arthropoda
- Clade: Pancrustacea
- Class: Insecta
- Order: Coleoptera
- Suborder: Polyphaga
- Infraorder: Cucujiformia
- Family: Chrysomelidae
- Genus: Macrocoma
- Species: M. buettikeriana

Binomial name
- Macrocoma buettikeriana Daccordi, 1979

Species of beetle

Macrocoma buettikeriana is a species of leaf beetle of Saudi Arabia, Oman and Egypt described by Mauro Daccordi in 1979.
