= Macrocoma sacra =

Scientific classification
- Kingdom: Animalia
- Phylum: Arthropoda
- Clade: Pancrustacea
- Class: Insecta
- Order: Coleoptera
- Suborder: Polyphaga
- Infraorder: Cucujiformia
- Family: Chrysomelidae
- Genus: Macrocoma
- Species: M. sacra

Binomial name
- Macrocoma sacra (Lopatin, 1983)

Synonyms
- Pseudocolaspis sacra Lopatin, 1983

Species of beetle

Macrocoma sacra is a species of leaf beetle of Saudi Arabia and Pakistan, described by Igor Lopatin in 1983.
