= Macrocoma oromiana =

Scientific classification
- Kingdom: Animalia
- Phylum: Arthropoda
- Clade: Pancrustacea
- Class: Insecta
- Order: Coleoptera
- Suborder: Polyphaga
- Infraorder: Cucujiformia
- Family: Chrysomelidae
- Genus: Macrocoma
- Species: M. oromiana

Binomial name
- Macrocoma oromiana Daccordi, 1978

Species of beetle

Macrocoma oromiana is a species of leaf beetle found on Alegranza in the Canary Islands and on Selvagem Grande in the Savage Islands, described by Mauro Daccordi in 1978.
