= Macrocoma parvula =

Scientific classification
- Kingdom: Animalia
- Phylum: Arthropoda
- Clade: Pancrustacea
- Class: Insecta
- Order: Coleoptera
- Suborder: Polyphaga
- Infraorder: Cucujiformia
- Family: Chrysomelidae
- Genus: Macrocoma
- Species: M. parvula

Binomial name
- Macrocoma parvula (Jacoby, 1895)

Synonyms
- Pseudocolaspis parvula Jacoby, 1895

Species of beetle

Macrocoma parvula is a species of leaf beetle from West Africa and the Democratic Republic of the Congo. It was first described as a species of Pseudocolaspis by Martin Jacoby in 1895, from specimens collected in Bismarckburg, Togo which Ernst Gustav Kraatz had sent to Jacoby for identification.
