= Macrocoma voeltzkowi =

Scientific classification
- Kingdom: Animalia
- Phylum: Arthropoda
- Clade: Pancrustacea
- Class: Insecta
- Order: Coleoptera
- Suborder: Polyphaga
- Infraorder: Cucujiformia
- Family: Chrysomelidae
- Genus: Macrocoma
- Species: M. voeltzkowi

Binomial name
- Macrocoma voeltzkowi (Weise, 1910)

Synonyms
- Eubrachys voeltzkowi Weise, 1910

Species of beetle

Macrocoma voeltzkowi is a species of leaf beetle found in Tanzania and the Democratic Republic of the Congo. It was first described from Mafia Island by Julius Weise in 1910.
