= Macrocoma millingeni =

Scientific classification
- Kingdom: Animalia
- Phylum: Arthropoda
- Clade: Pancrustacea
- Class: Insecta
- Order: Coleoptera
- Suborder: Polyphaga
- Infraorder: Cucujiformia
- Family: Chrysomelidae
- Genus: Macrocoma
- Species: M. millingeni

Binomial name
- Macrocoma millingeni (Pic, 1898)

Synonyms
- Pseudocolaspis millingeni Pic, 1898; Pseudocolaspis millingeni var. mesopotamicus Pic, 1898

Species of beetle

Macrocoma millingeni is a species of leaf beetle of the Arabian Peninsula and Mesopotamia, described by Maurice Pic in 1898. It is sometimes confused with the species Macrocoma leprieuri from North Africa.
