= Macrocoma peyerimhoffi =

Scientific classification
- Kingdom: Animalia
- Phylum: Arthropoda
- Clade: Pancrustacea
- Class: Insecta
- Order: Coleoptera
- Suborder: Polyphaga
- Infraorder: Cucujiformia
- Family: Chrysomelidae
- Genus: Macrocoma
- Species: M. peyerimhoffi

Binomial name
- Macrocoma peyerimhoffi Kocher, 1959

Species of beetle

Macrocoma peyerimhoffi is a species of leaf beetle of Morocco, described by Louis Kocher in 1959.
