= Macrocoma djurdjurensis =

Scientific classification
- Kingdom: Animalia
- Phylum: Arthropoda
- Clade: Pancrustacea
- Class: Insecta
- Order: Coleoptera
- Suborder: Polyphaga
- Infraorder: Cucujiformia
- Family: Chrysomelidae
- Genus: Macrocoma
- Species: M. djurdjurensis

Binomial name
- Macrocoma djurdjurensis Warchałowski, 2001

Species of beetle

Macrocoma djurdjurensis is a species of leaf beetle of Algeria, described by Andrzej Warchałowski in 2001.
