= Macrocoma rotroui =

Scientific classification
- Kingdom: Animalia
- Phylum: Arthropoda
- Clade: Pancrustacea
- Class: Insecta
- Order: Coleoptera
- Suborder: Polyphaga
- Infraorder: Cucujiformia
- Family: Chrysomelidae
- Genus: Macrocoma
- Species: M. rotroui

Binomial name
- Macrocoma rotroui Kocher, 1962

Species of beetle

Macrocoma rotroui is a species of leaf beetle from Morocco, described by Louis Kocher in 1962. It is possibly a synonym of Macrocoma bolivari.
