= Macrocoma fuscoaenea =

Scientific classification
- Kingdom: Animalia
- Phylum: Arthropoda
- Clade: Pancrustacea
- Class: Insecta
- Order: Coleoptera
- Suborder: Polyphaga
- Infraorder: Cucujiformia
- Family: Chrysomelidae
- Genus: Macrocoma
- Species: M. fuscoaenea

Binomial name
- Macrocoma fuscoaenea (Chapuis, 1879)

Synonyms
- Pseudocolaspis fuscoanaea Chapuis, 1879; Pseudocolaspis leucogramma Gestro, 1895

Species of beetle

Macrocoma fuscoaenea is a species of leaf beetle found in Ethiopia, Tanzania and the Democratic Republic of the Congo. It was first described by Félicien Chapuis in 1879.
