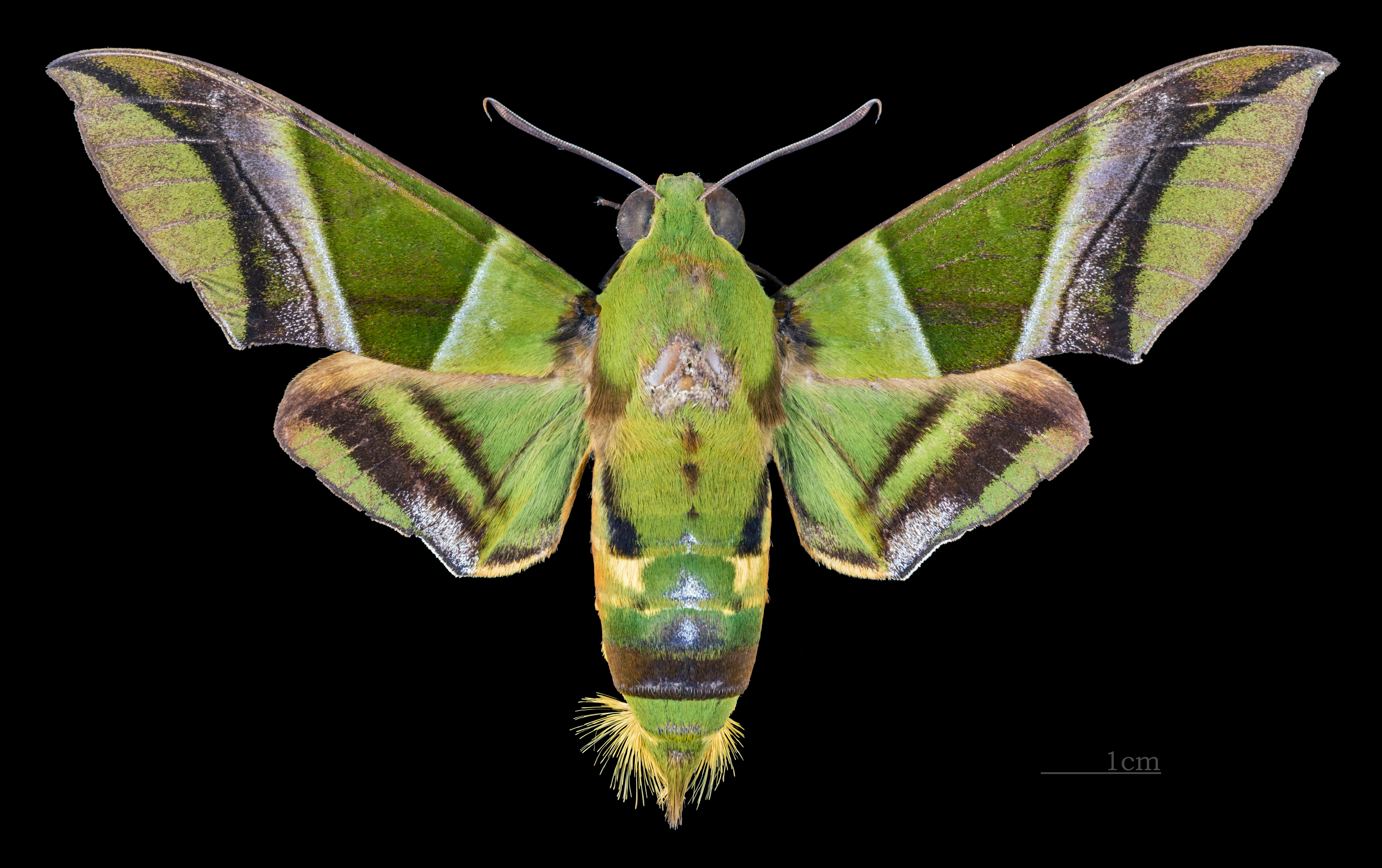

Scientific classification
- Domain: Eukaryota
- Kingdom: Animalia
- Phylum: Arthropoda
- Class: Insecta
- Order: Lepidoptera
- Family: Sphingidae
- Subtribe: Dilophonotina
- Genus: Oryba; Walker, 1856

Species
- See text

= Oryba =

Genus of moths

Oryba is a genus of moths in the family Sphingidae with two species found in the Neotropical realm.

== Species ==
- Oryba achemenides (Cramer, 1779)
- Oryba kadeni (Schaufuss, 1870)
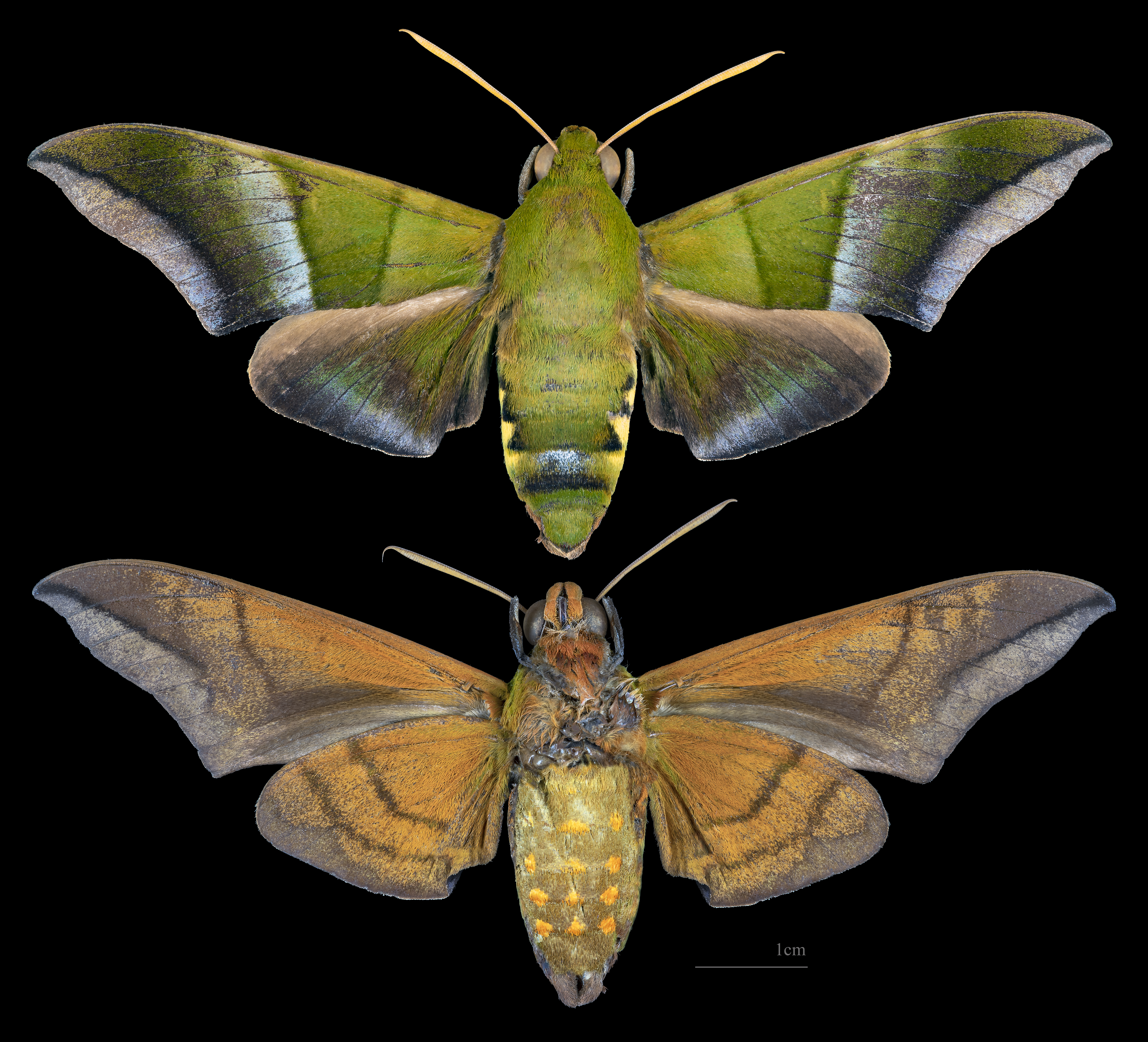
Oryba achemenides

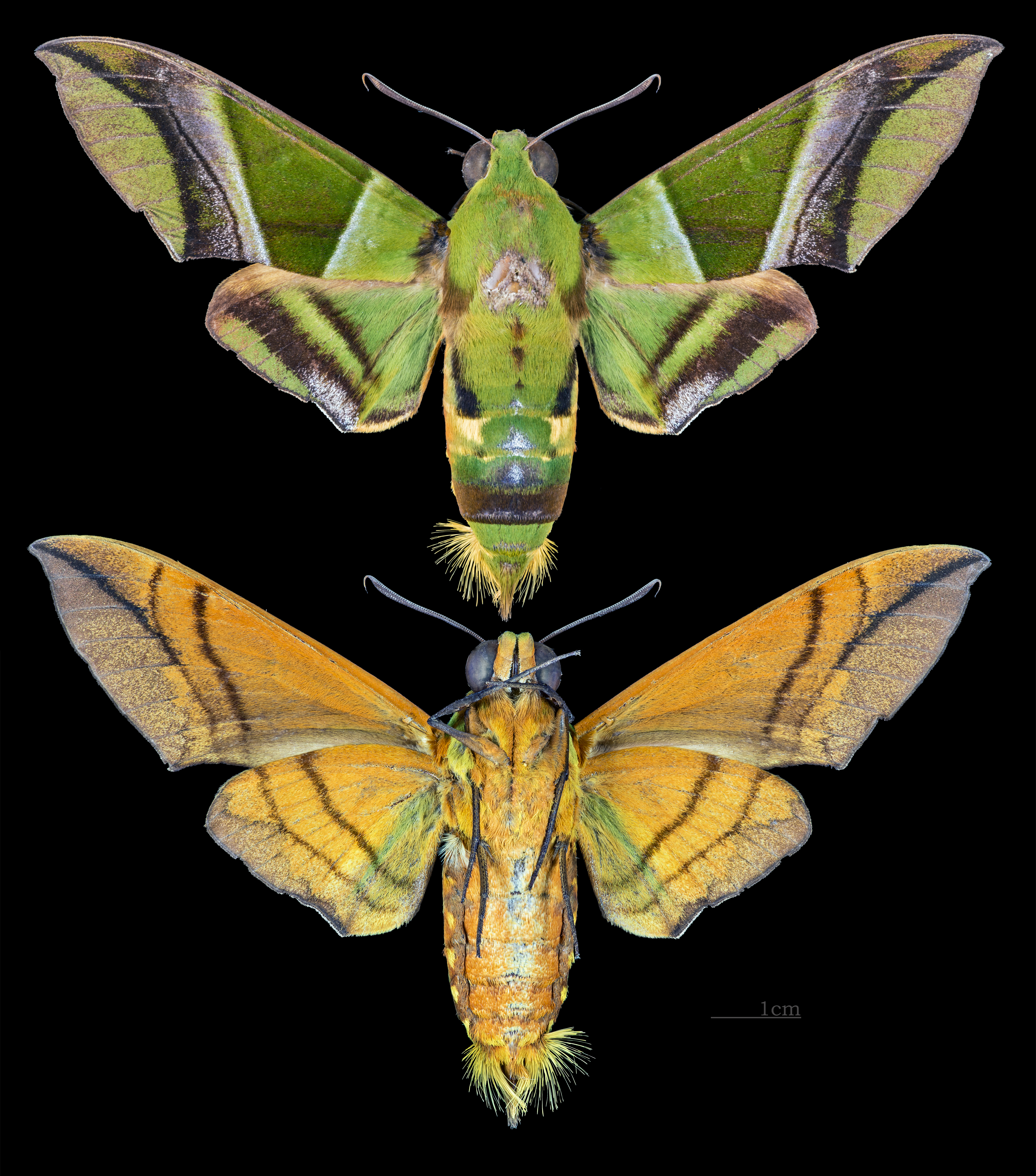
Oryba kadeni
