= Macrocoma apicicornis =

Scientific classification
- Kingdom: Animalia
- Phylum: Arthropoda
- Clade: Pancrustacea
- Class: Insecta
- Order: Coleoptera
- Suborder: Polyphaga
- Infraorder: Cucujiformia
- Family: Chrysomelidae
- Genus: Macrocoma
- Species: M. apicicornis

Binomial name
- Macrocoma apicicornis (Jacoby, 1897)

Synonyms
- Pseudocolaspis apicicornis Jacoby, 1897; Eubrachys apicicornis var. chalcitis Weise, 1909

Species of beetle

Macrocoma apicicornis is a species of leaf beetle found in Zimbabwe, Tanzania and the Democratic Republic of the Congo. It was first described from Mashonaland by Martin Jacoby in 1897.
