= Macrocoma budura =

Scientific classification
- Kingdom: Animalia
- Phylum: Arthropoda
- Clade: Pancrustacea
- Class: Insecta
- Order: Coleoptera
- Suborder: Polyphaga
- Infraorder: Cucujiformia
- Family: Chrysomelidae
- Genus: Macrocoma
- Species: M. budura

Binomial name
- Macrocoma budura Daccordi & Medvedev, 1996

Species of beetle

Macrocoma budura is a species of leaf beetle of Saudi Arabia, described by Mauro Daccordi & Lev Medvedev in 1996.
