= Macrocoma bolivari =

Scientific classification
- Kingdom: Animalia
- Phylum: Arthropoda
- Clade: Pancrustacea
- Class: Insecta
- Order: Coleoptera
- Suborder: Polyphaga
- Infraorder: Cucujiformia
- Family: Chrysomelidae
- Genus: Macrocoma
- Species: M. bolivari

Binomial name
- Macrocoma bolivari (Escalera, 1914)

Synonyms
- sensu stricto: Macrocoma bolivari ab. smirnovi Kocher, 1969; ?Macrocoma rotroui Kocher, 1962; Pseudocolaspis bolivari Escalera, 1914; antiatlantis: Macrocoma bolivari antiatlantis var. siruensis Kocher, 1969

Species of beetle

Macrocoma bolivari is a species of leaf beetle from Morocco. It was first described by Spanish entomologist Manuel Martínez de la Escalera in 1914, as a species of Pseudocolaspis.

== Subspecies ==
There are two subspecies of M. bolivari:

- Macrocoma bolivari antiatlantis Kocher, 1966: Described from Anti-Atlas mountains.
- Macrocoma bolivari bolivari (Escalera, 1914): The nominotypical subspecies. Common around the High Atlas range.
