= Macrocoma seriesericans =

Scientific classification
- Kingdom: Animalia
- Phylum: Arthropoda
- Clade: Pancrustacea
- Class: Insecta
- Order: Coleoptera
- Suborder: Polyphaga
- Infraorder: Cucujiformia
- Family: Chrysomelidae
- Genus: Macrocoma
- Species: M. seriesericans

Binomial name
- Macrocoma seriesericans (Fairmaire, 1876)

Synonyms
- Pseudocolaspis gossypiata Fairmaire, 1876; Pseudocolaspis seriesericans Fairmaire, 1876

Species of beetle

Macrocoma seriesericans is a species of leaf beetle of Algeria, described by Léon Fairmaire in 1876.
