= Macrocoma obscuripes =

Scientific classification
- Kingdom: Animalia
- Phylum: Arthropoda
- Clade: Pancrustacea
- Class: Insecta
- Order: Coleoptera
- Suborder: Polyphaga
- Infraorder: Cucujiformia
- Family: Chrysomelidae
- Genus: Macrocoma
- Species: M. obscuripes

Binomial name
- Macrocoma obscuripes (Wollaston, 1862)

Synonyms
- Pseudocolaspis obscuripes Wollaston, 1862

Species of beetle

Macrocoma obscuripes is a species of leaf beetle endemic to the Canary Islands. It was first described by Thomas Vernon Wollaston in 1862 as a species of Pseudocolaspis. It is found on Gran Canaria.
