= Macrocoma zarudnii =

Scientific classification
- Kingdom: Animalia
- Phylum: Arthropoda
- Clade: Pancrustacea
- Class: Insecta
- Order: Coleoptera
- Suborder: Polyphaga
- Infraorder: Cucujiformia
- Family: Chrysomelidae
- Genus: Macrocoma
- Species: M. zarudnii

Binomial name
- Macrocoma zarudnii Lopatin, 1985

Synonyms
- Macrocoma hormuziaca Warchałowski, 2001

Species of beetle

Macrocoma zarudnii is a species of leaf beetle found in Iran and the United Arab Emirates, described by Igor Lopatin in 1985.
