= Macrocoma hulai =

Scientific classification
- Kingdom: Animalia
- Phylum: Arthropoda
- Clade: Pancrustacea
- Class: Insecta
- Order: Coleoptera
- Suborder: Polyphaga
- Infraorder: Cucujiformia
- Family: Chrysomelidae
- Genus: Macrocoma
- Species: M. hulai

Binomial name
- Macrocoma hulai Zoia, 2012

Species of leaf beetle

Macrocoma hulai is a species of leaf beetle, endemic to Socotra. It was described by Stefano Zoia in 2012. It is named after Vladimir Hula, who collected part of the specimens studied.
