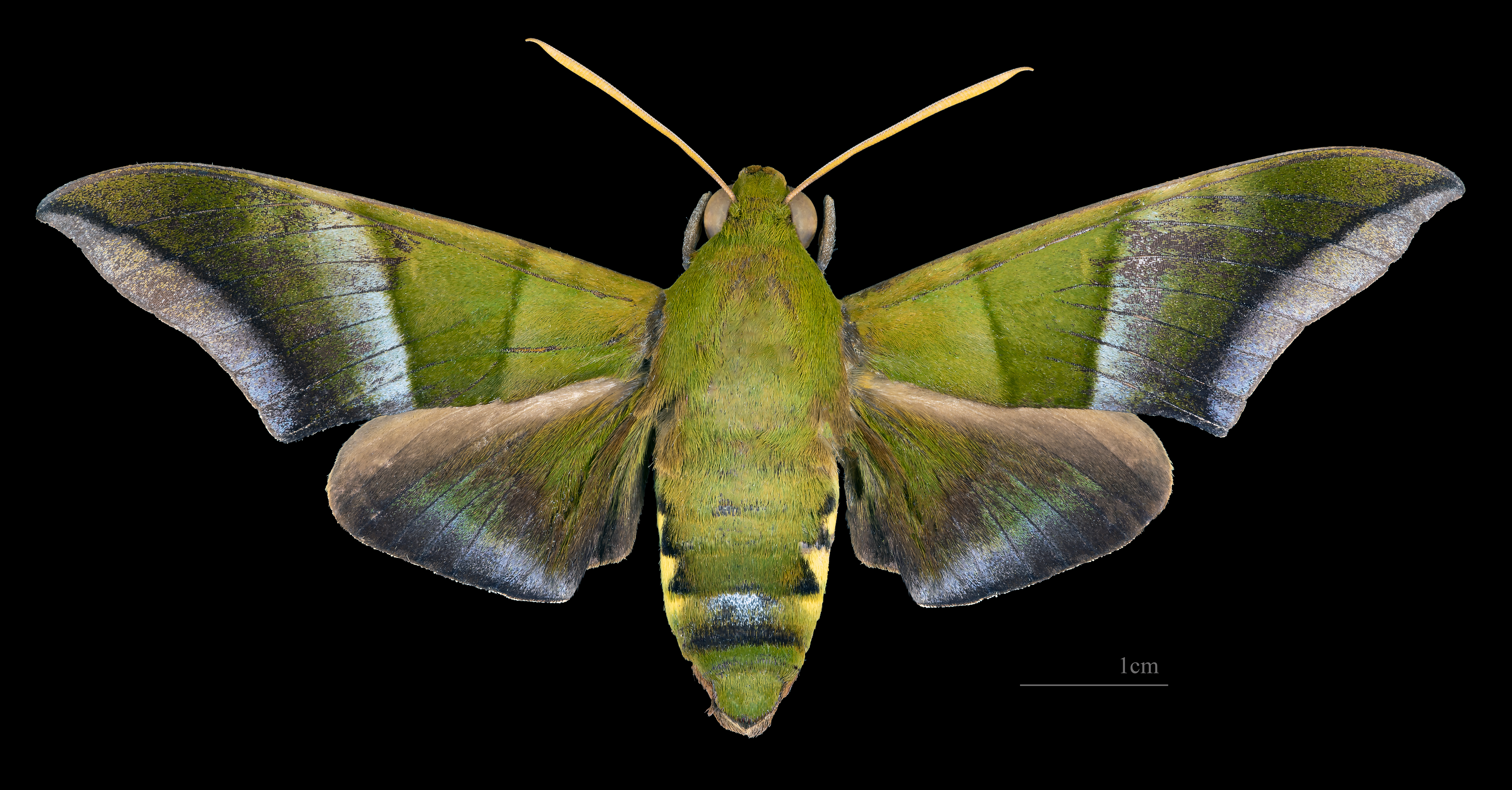
- Male dorsal
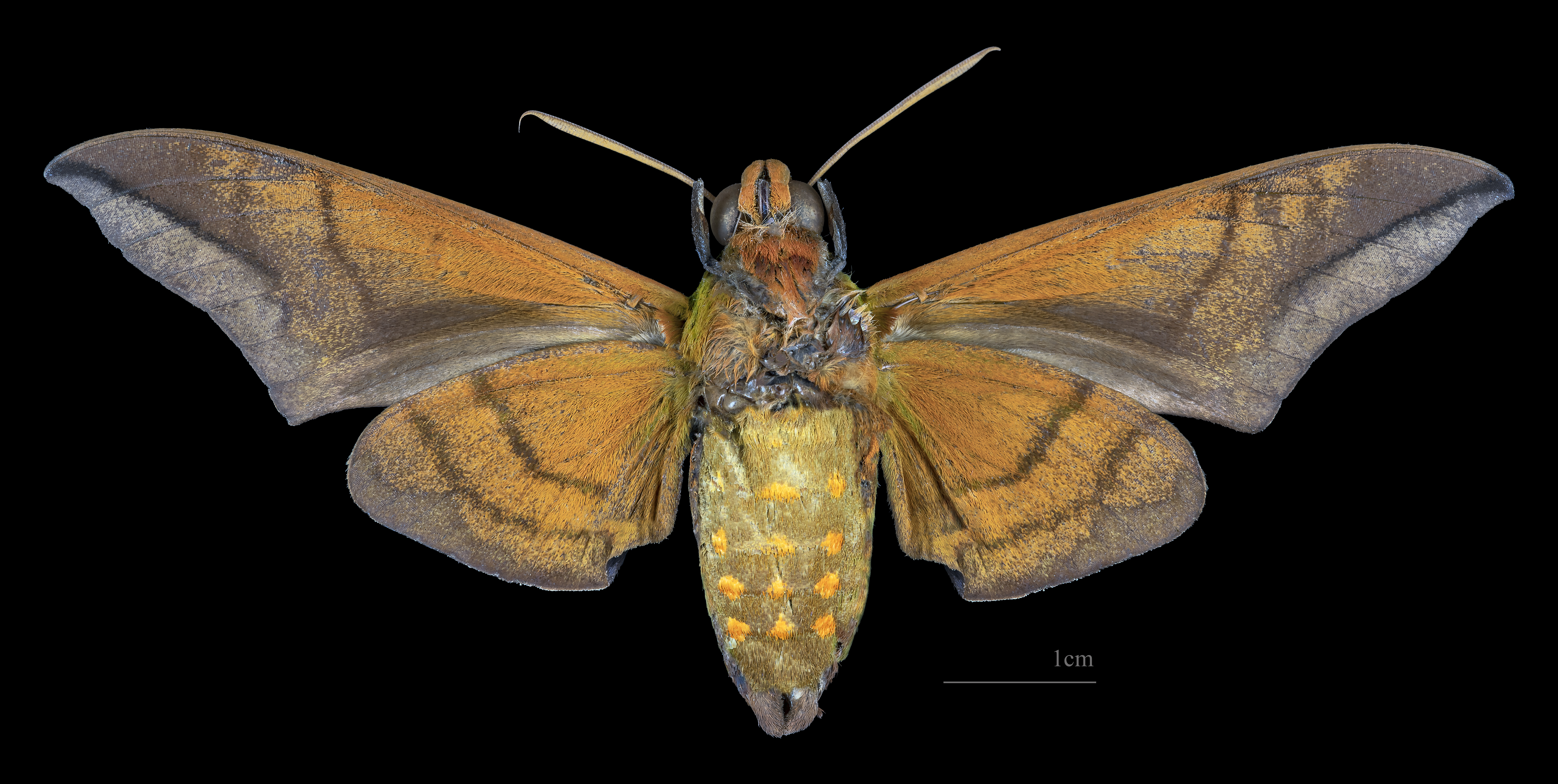
- Male ventral

Scientific classification
- Domain: Eukaryota
- Kingdom: Animalia
- Phylum: Arthropoda
- Class: Insecta
- Order: Lepidoptera
- Family: Sphingidae
- Genus: Oryba
- Species: O. achemenides

Binomial name
- Oryba achemenides (Cramer, 1779)

Synonyms
- Sphinx achemenides Cramer, 1779; Oryba robusta Walker, 1856; Oryba juliane Eitschberger, 2000

= Oryba achemenides =

Species of moth

Oryba achemenides is a moth of the family Sphingidae.

== Distribution ==
It is found from Central America to the Amazon region, including Belize, Guatemala, Costa Rica, Suriname, Venezuela, Brazil and Bolivia.

== Description ==
The wingspan is 100–120 mm. It is a large, heavy-bodied and large-eyed species with a dark green upperside and orange underside. The marginal band of the forewing upperside is much narrower than the distance between this area and the distal margin of the dark olive-green median trapezoidal area. There are no distinct bands on the hindwing upperside.

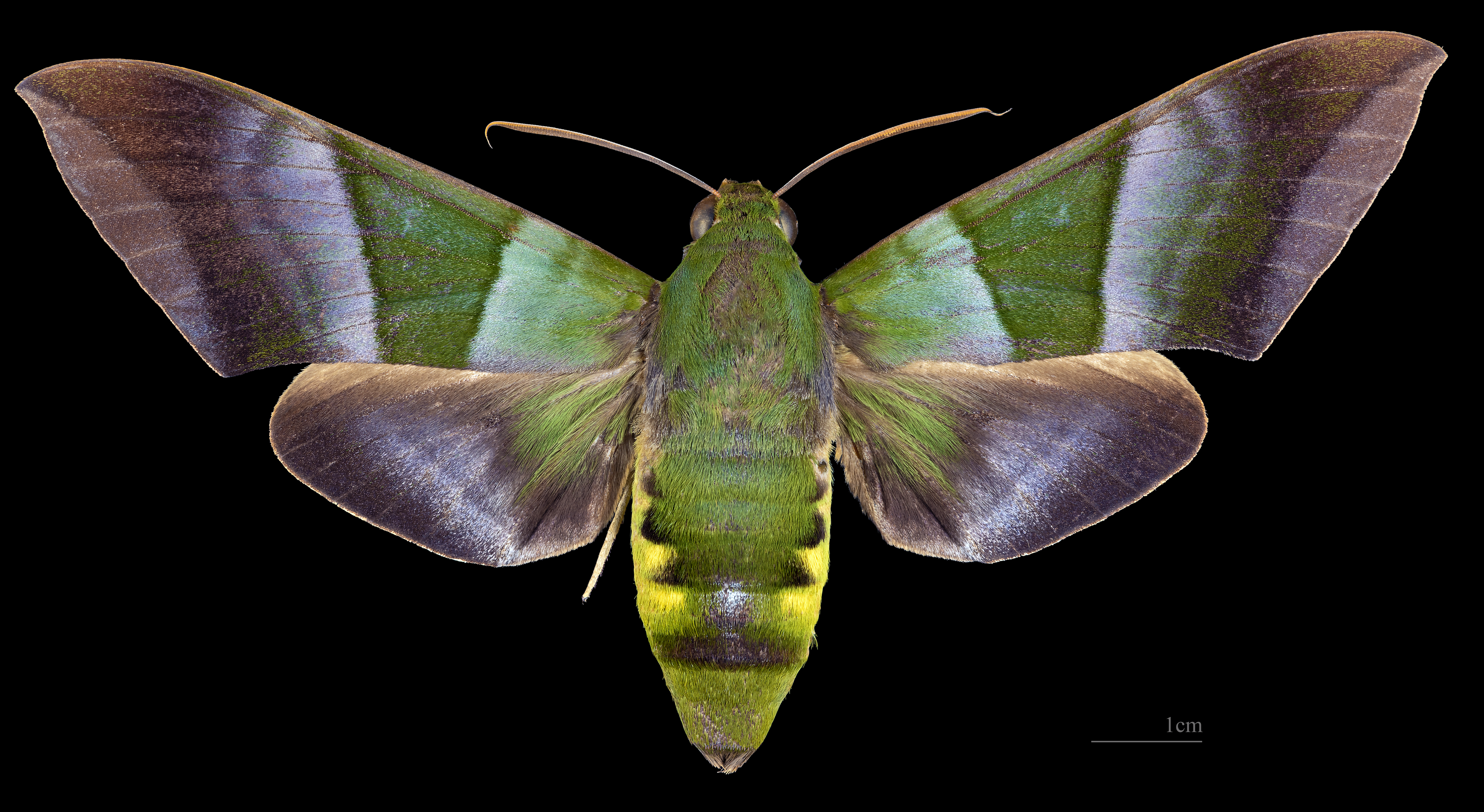
Oryba achemenides ♀

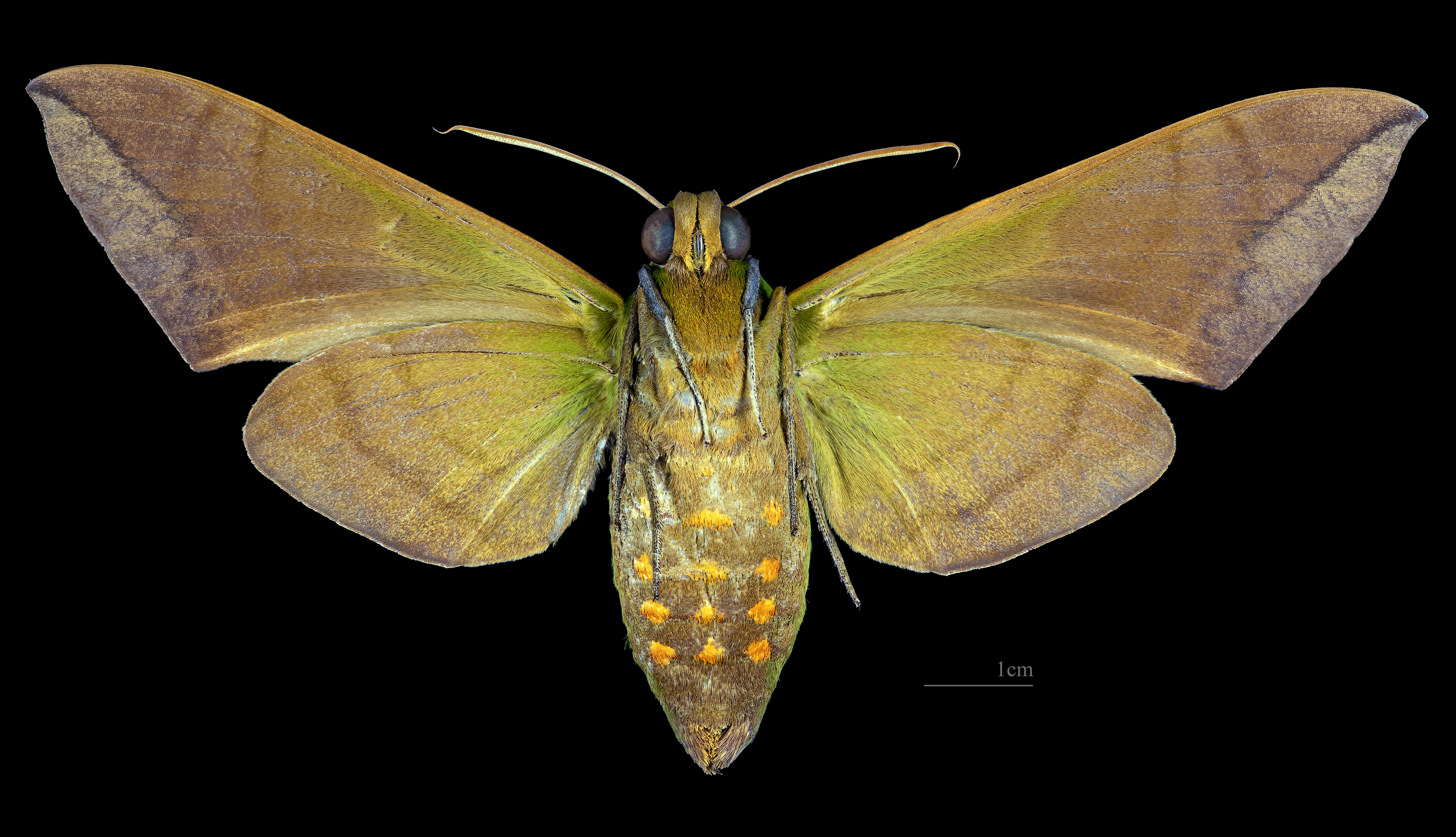
Oryba achemenides ♀ △

== Biology ==
There are probably multiple generations per year.
