= Macrocoma meruensis =

Scientific classification
- Kingdom: Animalia
- Phylum: Arthropoda
- Clade: Pancrustacea
- Class: Insecta
- Order: Coleoptera
- Suborder: Polyphaga
- Infraorder: Cucujiformia
- Family: Chrysomelidae
- Genus: Macrocoma
- Species: M. meruensis

Binomial name
- Macrocoma meruensis (Weise, 1909)

Synonyms
- Eubrachys meruensis Weise, 1909

Species of beetle

Macrocoma meruensis is a species of leaf beetle found in Tanzania and Democratic Republic of the Congo. It was first described by Julius Weise in 1909.
