= Macrocoma leprieuri =

Scientific classification
- Kingdom: Animalia
- Phylum: Arthropoda
- Clade: Pancrustacea
- Class: Insecta
- Order: Coleoptera
- Suborder: Polyphaga
- Infraorder: Cucujiformia
- Family: Chrysomelidae
- Genus: Macrocoma
- Species: M. leprieuri

Binomial name
- Macrocoma leprieuri (Lefèvre, 1876)

Synonyms
- Pseudocolaspis leprieuri Lefèvre, 1876; ?Pseudocolaspis pachydera Fairmaire, 1876; ?Macrocoma melillensis Kocher, 1967

Species of beetle

Macrocoma leprieuri is a species of leaf beetle from North Africa and the Arabian Peninsula to the Horn of Africa. It was first described by Édouard Lefèvre in 1876, as a species of Pachnephorus. According to Warchałowski (2001), Macrocoma leprieuri is restricted to North Africa, and the species Macrocoma millingeni from the Arabian Peninsula and Mesopotamia is sometimes confused with it.

== Subspecies ==
There are two subspecies of M. leprieuri:

- Macrocoma leprieuri leprieuri (Lefèvre, 1876): The nominotypical subspecies. Distributed in Morocco, Algeria, Tunisia, and the United Arab Emirates. Also reported from Saudi Arabia, Yemen, Egypt, Libya, Sudan, South Sudan, Ethiopia and Somalia. It measures between 3.6 and 4.5 mm.
- Macrocoma leprieuri majuscula Bechyné, 1957: Found in Egypt (Sinai Peninsula). It is larger in size than the nominal form of the species, measuring between 4.5 and 6 mm.
