= Camillo Schaufuß =

German entomologist, natural history specimen trader and naturalist

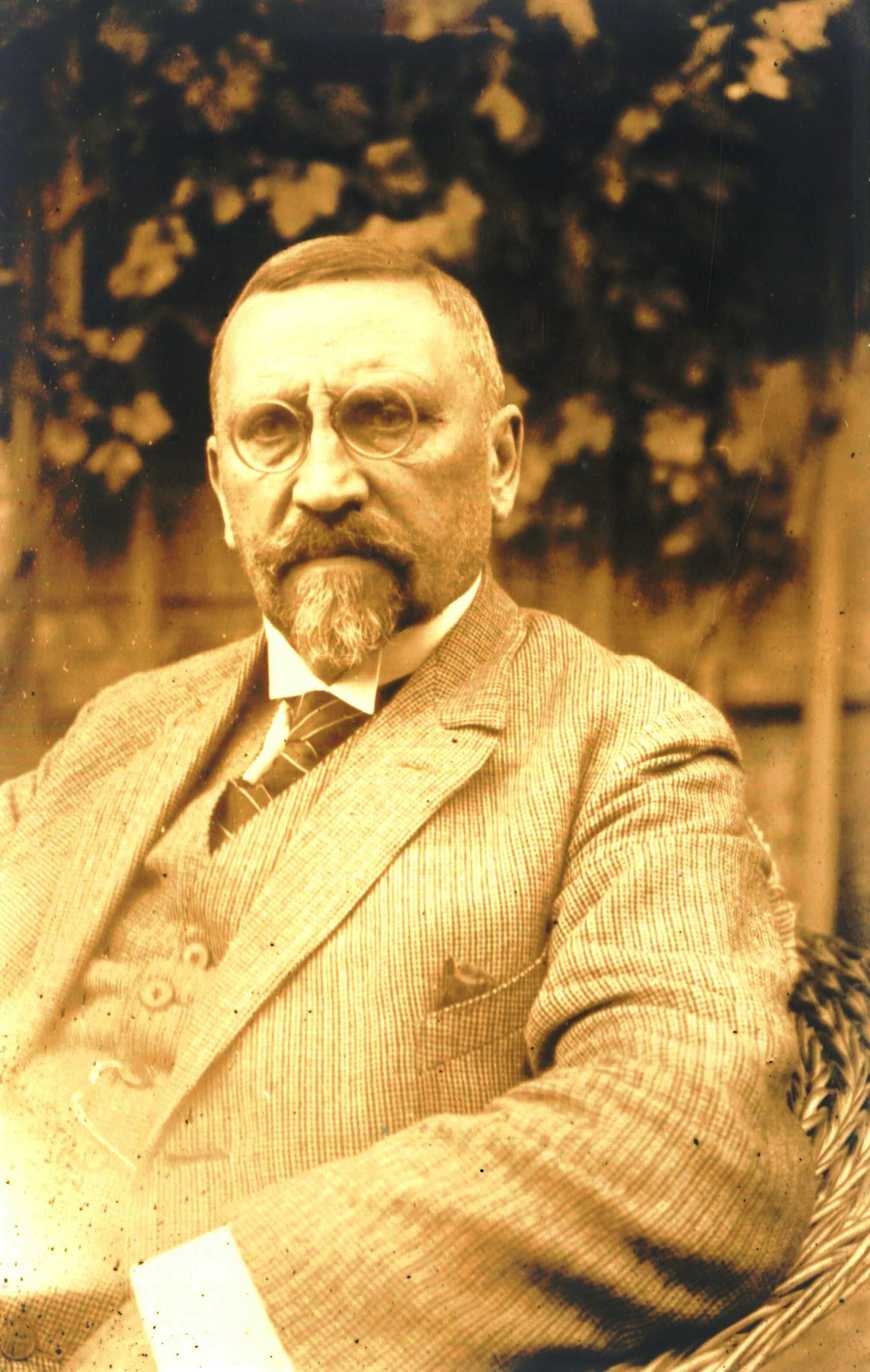
Schaufuß c. 1942

Camillo Festivus Christian Schaufuß (22 February 1862 – 9 January 1944) was a German entomologist, natural history specimen trader, naturalist and director of the “Ludwig Salvator” museum begun by his father. He continued Calwer’s Käferbuch which was used by insect collectors and edited some of its volumes. He described many new species including bark beetles from Madagascar.

== Life and work ==
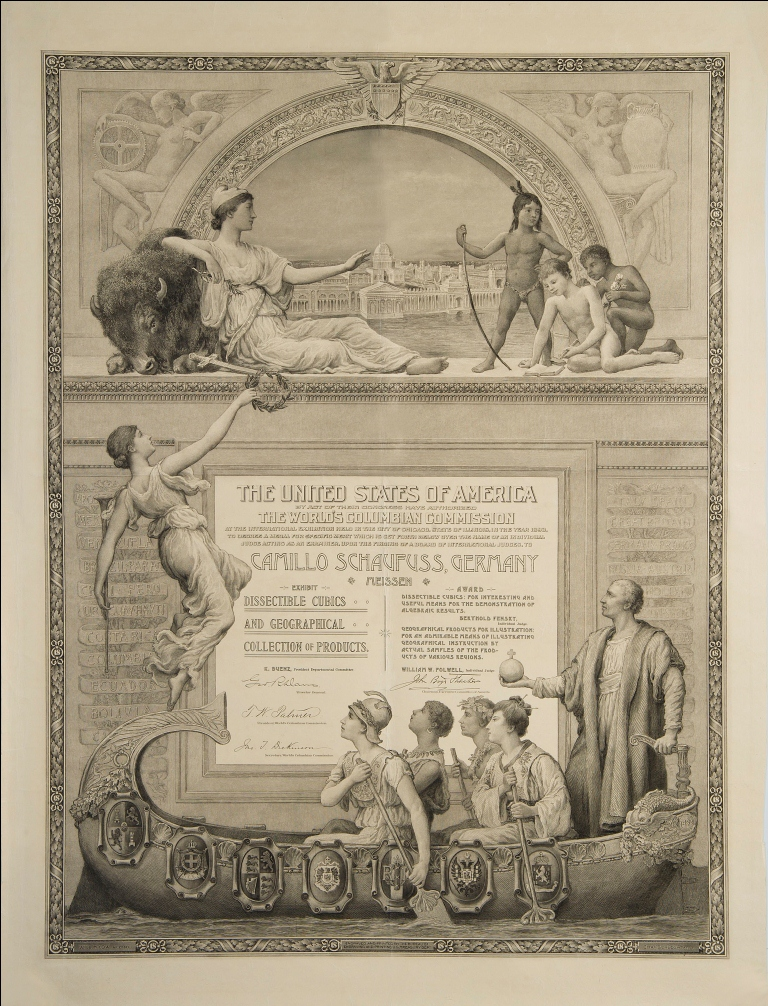
Exhibition certificate from the World's Columbian Exposition 1893

Schaufuß was born in Dresden, the son of the naturalist Ludwig Wilhelm Schaufuß and Clara Isidore née Kämmel. His father had established a natural history business and the son continued to take an interest in it. After his education in Dresden and the death of his father in 1890 he took over the business, initially running it in Dresden and then moving it to Meissen. He also began to edit the periodical Insektenbörse founded by his father in 1884 under the name of "Entomologisches Wochenblatt". He also took over the editorship of the periodical Deutsche entomologische National-Bibliothek. His business came to a standstill during World War I. After the war he became a director of the youth welfare office in Meissen and he also took an interest in the Meissen Animal Welfare Association. For his work in bird protection he received a Perner Medal. When a museum was opened in Meissen, he offered his bird collections to it through Prince Günther Viktor von Schwarzburg-Rudolstadt in 1892 but the offer was rejected. He then began to try and sell off his collections to collectors and museums. He published a catalogue of the Pselaphinae “Catalogus synonymicus Pselaphidarum adhuc descriptarum” (1888) and took an interest in bark beetles.

Schaufuß married Marie née Maun from Großenhain who died five years later. He married again in 1902 and had three children.
