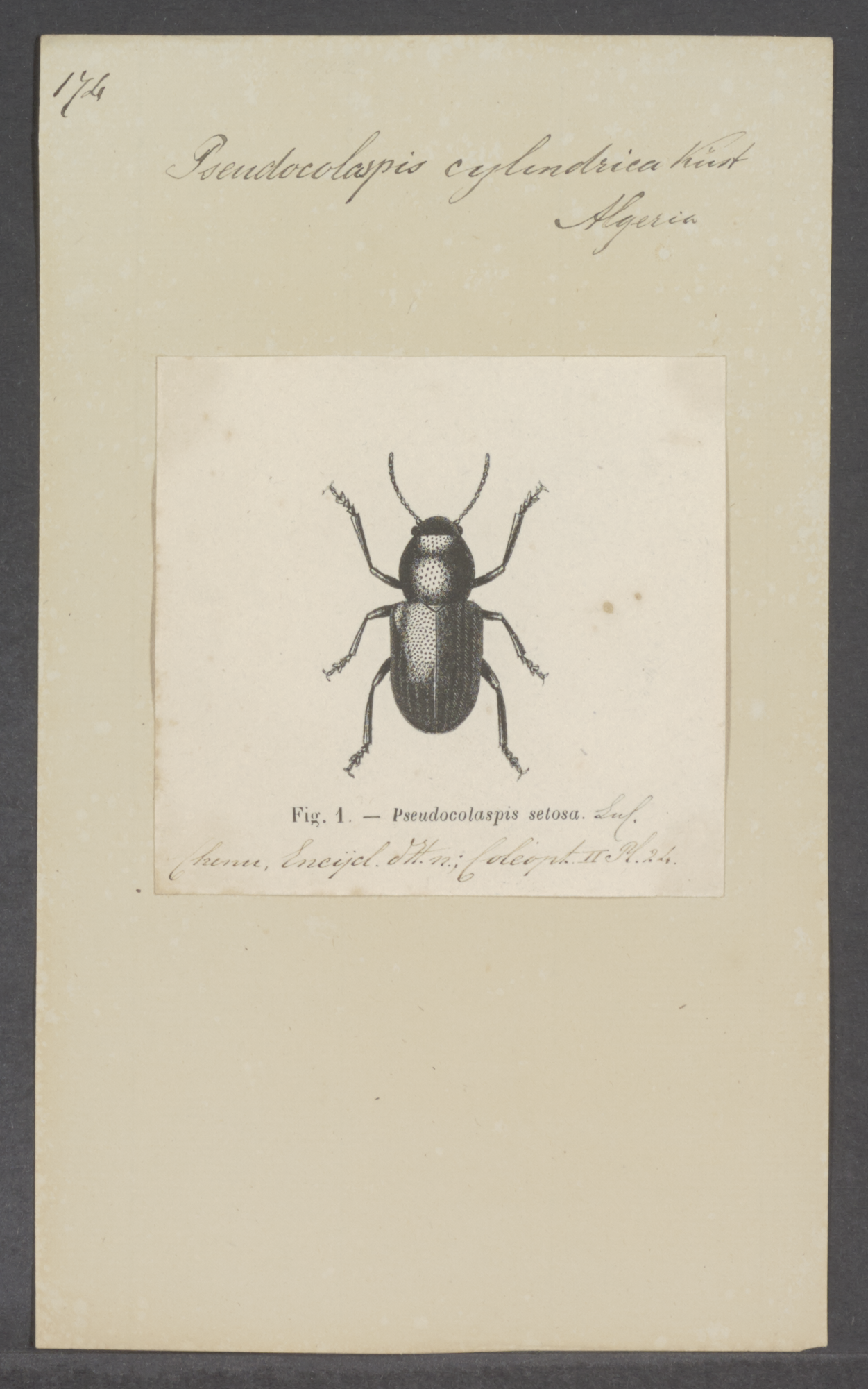

Scientific classification
- Kingdom: Animalia
- Phylum: Arthropoda
- Clade: Pancrustacea
- Class: Insecta
- Order: Coleoptera
- Suborder: Polyphaga
- Infraorder: Cucujiformia
- Family: Chrysomelidae
- Genus: Macrocoma
- Species: M. setosa

Binomial name
- Macrocoma setosa (H. Lucas, 1846)

Synonyms
- Sensu stricto: Pseudocolaspis setosa H. Lucas, 1846; Pseudocolaspis cylindrica var. vaucheri Pic, 1907; mesatlantica: Macrocoma cylindrica mesatlantica Kocher, 1959; Macrocoma cylindrica mesatlantica var. fauconnieri Kocher, 1959

= Macrocoma setosa =

Species of beetle

Macrocoma setosa is a species of leaf beetle found in Algeria and Morocco. It was first described by Hippolyte Lucas in 1846, as a species of Pseudocolaspis.

== Subspecies ==
There are two subspecies of M. setosa:

- Macrocoma setosa mesatlantica Kocher, 1959: Found in Morocco. Inhabits the Middle Atlas range.
- Macrocoma setosa setosa (H. Lucas, 1846): The nominotypical subspecies. Found in Algeria and Morocco.
