= Thure Palm =

Swedish entomologist (1894–1987)

Thure Wilhelm Palm (30 January 1894 – 2 May 1987) was a Swedish entomologist who worked mainly on beetles. He made large collections of Scandinavian insects which are now in the University of Lund and described numerous species, particularly those of importance to forestry.

Palm was born in Bellinga near Ystad in southern Sweden to Oscar Palm and Agnes Marie Louise Hederström. He became interested in insects when he was a teenage student and began to make collections. In 1918, he became a forestry officer in Domänverket. He began to study Swedish insects, especially those of importance to forestry, with renewed vigour from 1926. He described numerous species from his collections, publishing nearly 200 papers, and made collections from outside Sweden, including the Canary Islands, Kenya, Thailand, Malaysia, the Gambia and Bulgaria.

He was awarded an honorary doctorate in 1953 by the University of Lund. He contributed to the series Svensk Insektfauna from 1948 to 1972. His collections were donated to the University of Lund. He died at Malmö.
