= Macrocoma henoni =

Scientific classification
- Kingdom: Animalia
- Phylum: Arthropoda
- Clade: Pancrustacea
- Class: Insecta
- Order: Coleoptera
- Suborder: Polyphaga
- Infraorder: Cucujiformia
- Family: Chrysomelidae
- Genus: Macrocoma
- Species: M. henoni

Binomial name
- Macrocoma henoni (Pic, 1894)

Synonyms
- sensu stricto: Macrocoma henoni var. reymondi Kocher, 1959; Macrocoma henoni var. sarroensis Kocher, 1959; Pseudocolaspis henoni Pic, 1894; occidentalis: ?Macrocoma debduensis Kocher, 1967; ?Pseudocolaspis cyanea Raffray, 1873; ?Pseudocolaspis mogadorensis Pic, 1912; Macrocoma henoni var. atlasica Kocher, 1959; Macrocoma henoni var. nigrita Kocher, 1959; Macrocoma henoni var. susica Kocher, 1967; Macrocoma henoni occidentalis var. lindbergi Kocher, 1967; Macrocoma henoni occidentalis var. pardoi Kocher, 1967; Pseudocolaspis occidentalis Escalera, 1914; Pseudocolaspis pici Escalera, 1914

Subspecies of beetle

Macrocoma henoni is a species of leaf beetle from North Africa and Iraq. It was first described by Maurice Pic in 1894, as a species of Pseudocolaspis.

== Subspecies ==
There are three subspecies of M. henoni:

- Macrocoma henoni babylonica Lopatin, 1986: Found in Iraq.
- Macrocoma henoni henoni (Pic, 1894): The nominotypical subspecies. Distributed mainly in Algeria and northern Morocco.
- Macrocoma henoni occidentalis (Escalera, 1914): Distributed mainly in southern Morocco.
