= Sextus Otto Lindberg =

Swedish physician and botanist

Sextus Otto Lindberg (29 March 1835 – 20 February 1889) was a Swedish medical doctor and botanist, known as a bryologist.

== Life ==
He was born in Stockholm, and educated in Uppsala. He worked in the Grand Duchy of Finland, then part of the Russian Empire. He became professor of botany, and dean of the physics-mathematics faculty, at the University of Helsingfors.

With Emil Frithiof Lackström he edited the exsiccata Hepaticae Scandinavicae exsiccata quarum specimina ediderunt S. O. Lindberg et E. Fr. Lackström (1874).

He was honored with the genus name Lindbergia in the family Leskeaceae, published by Swedish bryologist Nils Conrad Kindberg in 1897. His son Harald was honored with the genus name Lindbergella (a synonym of Poa) in the family Poaceae, published by Irish botanist Norman Bor in 1969. Between 1993 and 1997 Sinikka Piippo edited the exsiccata Hepaticae Exsiccatae S. O. Lindbergii with the serial specimens distributed by the Botanical Museum, University of Helsinki (now belonging to the Finnish Museum of Natural History).

Lindberg died at Helsingfors. He was the father of the botanist Harald Lindberg (1871–1963).
