= Ludwig Wilhelm Schaufuss =

German entomologist (1833–1890)

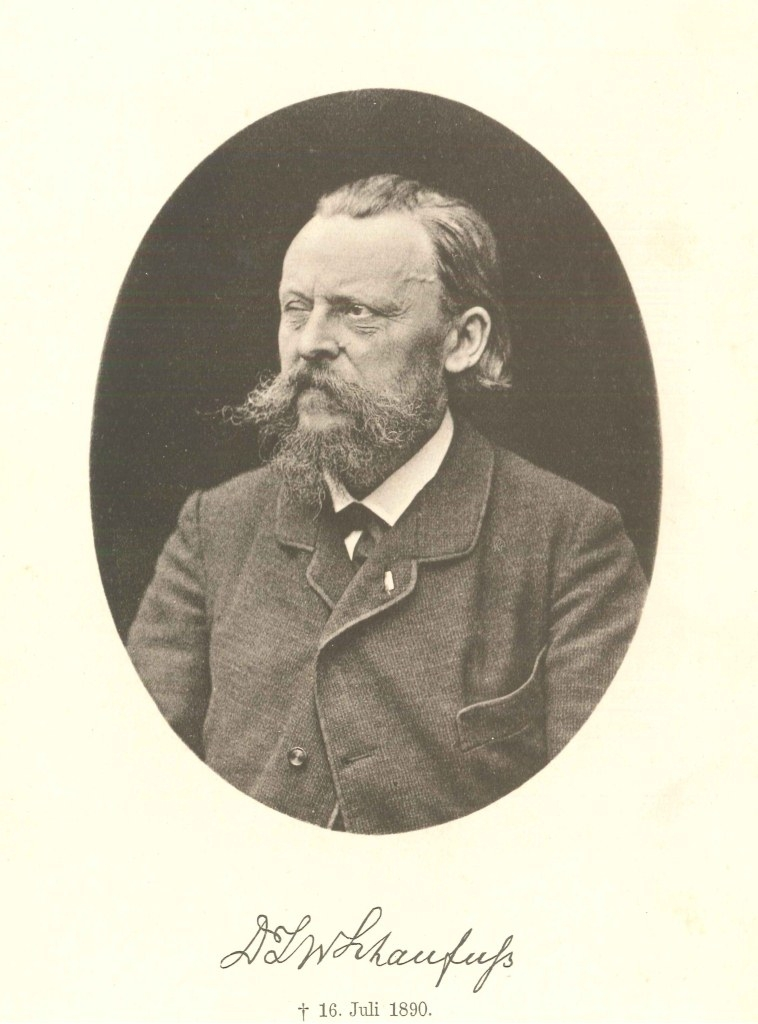
Ludwig Wilhelm Schaufuss

Ludwig Wilhelm Schaufuss (24 August 1833, in Greiz – 16 July 1890, in Dresden) was a self-taught German natural scientist. He worked as a researcher mainly in zoology (entomology) and he discovered unknown insects mainly Coleoptera. Ludwig Schaufuss mastered taxidermy under Oskar Klocke. In 1857 he purchased the Klocke dealership and sold with his wife animal preparations and educational materials worldwide at first under the name E. Klocke. Schaufuss owned and edited the entomological magazine Nunquam Otiosus. His son Camillo Festivus Christian Schaufuss, also an entomologist, took over the dealership in Dresden.

In 1865 he was elected a Member of the Academy of Sciences Leopoldina.

== Works ==
Very numerous and including two monographs

Partial list

- Schaufuss, L.W. 1866. Monographie der Scydmaeniden Central- und Südamerika's. Novorum Actorum Academiae Caesareae Leopoldino-Carolinae Germanicae Naturae Curiosorum 33(6), 1–103, pls. 1–4. [1867]
- Schaufuss, L.W. 1884. Die Scydmaeniden Nord-Ost-Afrika's, der Sunda-Inseln und Neu-Guinea's im Museo Civico di Storia Naturale zu Genua. Annali del Museo Civico di Storia Naturale di Genova Serie 2a, 1: 387–424.
- Schaufuss, L.W. 1890. System-schema der Pselaphiden, ein Blick in die Vorseit, in die Gegenwart und in die Zukunft. Tijdschrift voor Entomologie 33: 101–162
- Schaufuss L. W. 1870. Die exotischen Lepidoptera heterocera der früher Kaden'schen Sammlung. Nunquam otiosus 1(1):7–23. (Carl Gottfried Kaden collection)
