= Harald Lindberg =

Finnish botanist (1871–1963)

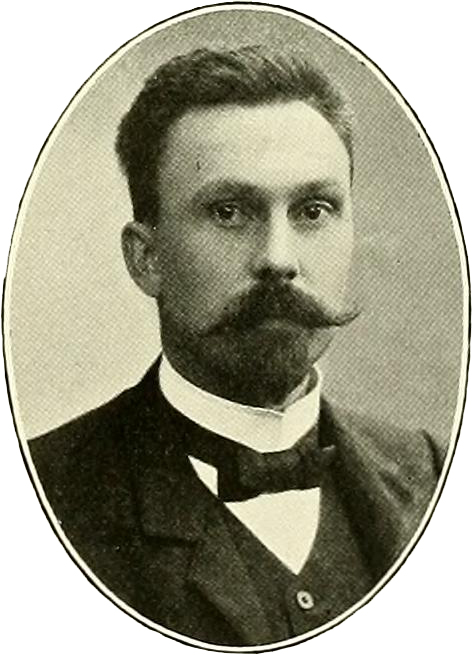
Harald Lindberg, 1904

Harald Lindberg (2 November 1871, Helsinki – 13 March 1963, Helsinki) was a Finnish botanist of Swedish parentage. He was the son of botanist Sextus Otto Lindberg (1835–1889).

He studied natural sciences at the University of Helsinki, later spending several years working as a secondary school teacher. In 1910 he obtained his PhD at Helsinki with a dissertation on Alchemilla vulgaris. Afterwards, he served as first custodian at the botanical museum in Helsinki, where he remained until his retirement in 1941.

Throughout his career, he collected and studied Fennoscandian flora that included subfossil specimens and bryophytes. He also made important contributions in his investigations of plants native to southern Europe and northern Africa; Spain, Sicily, Greece, Cyprus, Morocco, et al. In 1932 he visited Britain and Ireland, where he collected specimens from the genus Taraxacum.

As a taxonomist, he is credited with describing 150 new botanical species. From 1906 to 1945 he was tasked with compilation of the exsiccata "Plantae Finlandiae Exsiccatae". In 1969 the grass genus Lindbergella (synonym of Poa) was named in his honor by Norman Loftus Bor. In the field of entomology he published the treatise "Coleoptera insularum Canariensium" (1958).

== Principal works ==
- "Enumeratio plantarum in Fennoscandia orientali sponte et subsponte nascentium", 1901.
- "Schedae operis quod inscribitur Plantae Finlandiae exsiccatae e Museo Botanico Universitatis Helsingforsiensis distributae ", 1906–1944.
- "Itinera mediterranea", 1932.
- Die Früchte der Taraxacum-Arten Finnlands, 1935.
- "Iter Cyprium", 1946.
