= Tortula virescens =

Scientific classification
- Kingdom: Plantae
- Division: Bryophyta
- Class: Bryopsida
- Subclass: Dicranidae
- Order: Pottiales
- Family: Pottiaceae
- Genus: Tortula
- Species: T. virescens

Binomial name
- Tortula virescens (De Not.) De Not.

Species of moss

Tortula virescens is a species of moss belonging to the family Pottiaceae.

It is native to Europe and Northern America.
