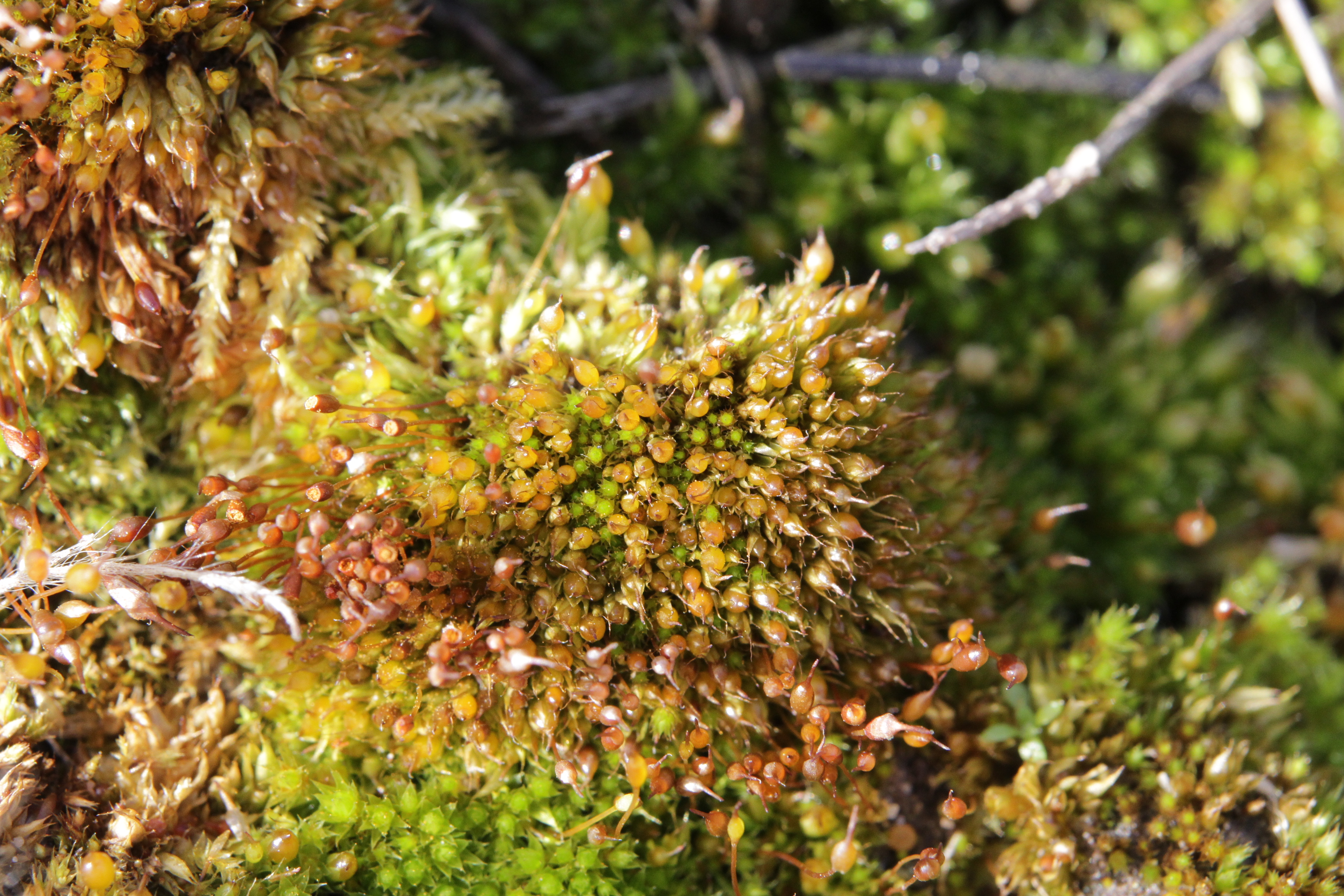

Scientific classification
- Kingdom: Plantae
- Division: Bryophyta
- Class: Bryopsida
- Subclass: Dicranidae
- Order: Pottiales
- Family: Pottiaceae
- Genus: Tortula
- Species: T. protobryoides

Binomial name
- Tortula protobryoides R.H.Zander

= Tortula protobryoides =

Species of moss

Additional information needed

Tortula protobryoides is a species of moss belonging to the family Pottiaceae.

It is native to Europe and Northern America.

Synonyms:

- Pottia bryoides (Dicks.) Mitt.
