= Bruchia elegans =

Scientific classification
- Kingdom: Plantae
- Division: Bryophyta
- Class: Bryopsida
- Subclass: Dicranidae
- Order: Bruchiales
- Family: Bruchiaceae
- Genus: Bruchia
- Species: B. elegans

Binomial name
- Bruchia elegans (Hornsch.) Müll. Hal.

Synonyms
- Sporledera elegans (Hornsch.) Müll. Hal.

Species of haplolepideous moss

Bruchia elegans is a species of haplolepideous mosses (Dicranidae) in the family Bruchiaceae.
