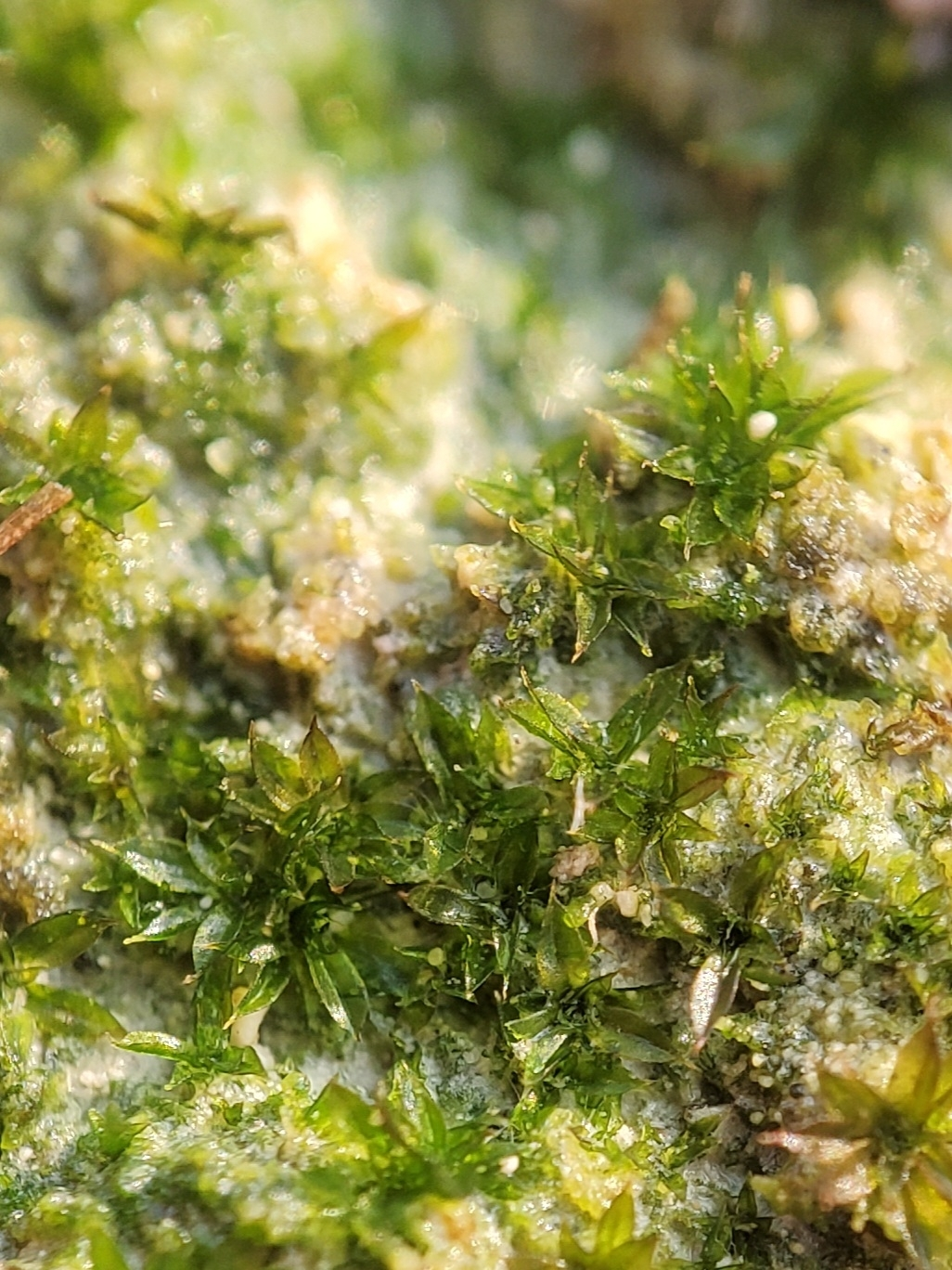

Scientific classification
- Kingdom: Plantae
- Division: Bryophyta
- Class: Bryopsida
- Subclass: Dicranidae
- Order: Pottiales
- Family: Pottiaceae
- Genus: Tortula
- Species: T. cernua

Binomial name
- Tortula cernua (Huebener) Lindb.

Synonyms
- List: Anacalypta inclinata Nees; Cynodon latifolius (Wahlenb.) Brid.; Cynodontium latifolium Schwägr.; Dermatodon camptothecius (Kindb.) Kindb.; Dermatodon cernuus Huebener; Dermatodon cernuus subsp. xanthopus (Kindb.) Kindb.; Desmatodon argentinicus Broth.; Desmatodon camptothecius Kindb.; Desmatodon cernuus (Huebener) Bruch & Schimp.; Desmatodon cernuus var. xanthopus Kindb.; Desmatodon inclinatus Sendtn.; Desmatodon oxneri Laz.; Desmatodon randii (Kenn.) Laz.; Desmatodon wahlenbergii Ångstr.; Didymodon latifolius Wahlenb.; Didymodon pilifer Wahlenb.; Entosthodon neoscoticus M.S.Br.; Pottia randii Kenn.; Swartzia pilifera Brid.; Tortula argentinica (Broth.) R.H.Zander; Tortula cernua var. xanthopus (Kindb.) R.H.Zander; Tortula randii (Kenn.) R.H.Zander; Trichostomum cernuum (Huebener) Lindb.; Trichostomum inclinatum (Sendtn.) Müll.Hal.

= Tortula cernua =

Species of moss

Tortula cernua, also known as narrowleaf screw moss and flamingo moss, is a widely-distributed species of moss in the family Pottiaceae. First described in 1833, it is characterised by elliptical leaves with distinctive bordered margins and spore capsules that bend downward at an angle. The species exhibits an unusual reproductive strategy involving springtails that may assist in fertilisation by transferring sperm between plants. While found across Europe, North and South America, and Asia, it is considered rare in many areas, including Britain where it is classified as endangered. It grows primarily on calcareous substrates, particularly on lime-rich waste from historical industrial sites, and requires specific chemical and environmental conditions to grow, making it vulnerable to habitat loss.

== Taxonomy ==
Tortula cernua was first described as a species in 1833 by the German botanist Johann Wilhelm Peter Hübener in his work Muscologia Germanica; he initially classified it in the genus Desmatodon. In his original description, Hübener provided a detailed description of Desmatodon cernuus based on specimens discovered by Gottfried Reinhold Treviranus in summer 1826 on the Schlern (then called Schleherngebirge) in South Tyrol, which is now part of northern Italy. He described it as having a very short simple stem, barely over 1 inch high. The leaves were described as crowded in tufts, lying overlapped like roof tiles, erect-spreading, small at the base and almost scale-like, becoming larger and broader above, oblong-ovate, sharply pointed, hollow, and entire-margined. He noted the strong nerve (costa) which was keel-like at the base and extended to the tip, becoming reddish-brown. The capsule was described as very short egg-shaped, almost spherical, strongly curved over, nearly horizontal, smooth, yellow-green becoming light brown with age, and constricted at the reddish ringed mouth. The peristome teeth were described as short, broad-lanceolate, pointed, purple, with raised cross-stripes, and delicately perforated at the base. Sextus Otto Lindberg transferred the species to the genus Tortula in 1879. In 1993, Richard Henry Zander included it in his classification of Pottiaceae under Tortula.

The taxon Entosthodon neoscoticus was originally described by Margaret Sibella Brown based on its morphological resemblance to Entosthodon in gametophyte size and appearance, as well as its capsule asymmetry, which is characteristic of Funaria. However, subsequent studies determined it to be conspecific with Tortula randii. R.T. Wareham (1939) described Pottia randii as gymnostomous (lacking peristome teeth), but re-examination of the type specimen of E. neoscoticus revealed the presence of minute yet distinct peristome teeth. This observation was consistent with an earlier report by Britton and Williams, who noted a rudimentary, papillose peristome near the annulus. These findings confirmed that Entosthodon neoscoticus does not belong in Entosthodon and is instead a synonym of Tortula randii. North American bryologists typically treat Tortula randii as a synonym of Tortula cernua, although this synonymy is disputed by European researchers.

== Description ==
Tortula cernua is characterised by its distinctive leaf and reproductive structures. The leaves are elliptical in shape, with tips that range from broadly pointed to rounded, often ending in a small point or sharp projection. The leaf margins curl under in the middle portion and are bordered by 2–3 rows of specialised cells that are narrower and more rectangular than the surrounding tissue. These border cells have thicker walls and can be layered in one or two levels.

Running through the centre of each leaf is a prominent vein (costa) that either reaches the tip or extends slightly beyond it. The vein is notably narrow near the tip, showing 3–4 cells across its curved upper surface. The cells of the leaf blade (lamina) near the tip are either hexagonal or rectangular in shape, measuring about 16–24 micrometres (μm) in width (though ranging from 13–28), and are typically smooth or rarely showing very slight surface bumps.

The species is autoicous, meaning male and female reproductive structures occur on the same plant but in different locations. Field observations have documented a relationship between this moss and springtails (Collembola). In northern Norway, masses of the springtail species Xenylla humicola have been observed moving among the apical leaves of fertile shoots, apparently attracted by sex-specific volatile compounds produced by the plants. This suggests springtails may assist in fertilisation by transferring sperm between plants, similar to insect pollination in flowering plants. While T. cernua can self-fertilise due to its autoicous nature, springtail-mediated fertilisation may promote cross-fertilisation between different genetic individuals, which could be particularly important for maintaining genetic diversity in the species' characteristically isolated and unstable habitat patches.

The spore-producing structures (sporophytes) are held above the plant on stalks (setae) that measure 0.6–1.2 cm in length. The spore capsules are either short-cylindrical and curved or egg-shaped and symmetrical along two sides, typically bent downward at an angle or occasionally positioned almost parallel to the ground. The capsule's main body (urn) measures 1–1.8 mm in length. Plants produce two generations of sporophytes per year – early embryos from current season fertilisations and meiotic sporophytes from the previous season's fertilisations. Empty sporophytes from earlier years can also persist on the plants.

The peristome, a specialised structure that controls spore release, is weakly developed in this species. It consists of 16 teeth that are not twisted and split almost to their base into 2–3 branches with various perforations. These teeth are quite short, measuring only 100–200 μm, and may have a very low or absent basal membrane. The capsule is topped by a lid (operculum) measuring 0.2–1.5 mm. The spores are spherical, densely covered in tiny bumps, and measure 25–35 μm in diameter.

Without sporophytes present, T. cernua cannot be reliably identified. The species is best distinguished by a combination of its distinctly bordered leaves with elongated narrow cells, nodding to horizontal and slightly curved capsules, and orange to brown peristome teeth that are not twisted, straight when dry, and deeply split into 32 branches that are often irregularly perforated.

== Distribution and habitat ==
The species has a wide global distribution, occurring in North and South America, Europe, and Asia. In Europe, while it is found across the continent, records are typically sparse and isolated. In Switzerland, where it was last observed in 1942, it historically occurred in the eastern Central Alps and Ticino regions from hillside areas up to subalpine elevations at 200–1,500 m (660–4,920 ft). In these areas, it grew on old, damp walls and rocks, preferring calcareous stone substrates like mortar and clay, as well as sandy-loamy soils.

In Britain, T. cernua is classified as endangered in the Bryophyte Red List and is protected under Schedule 8 of the Wildlife and Countryside Act 1981. The UK population is restricted to a small area spanning South Yorkshire, north Nottinghamshire and north-east Derbyshire. In these locations, the species grows specifically on fine lime waste with high pH values (typically between 8.7 and 9.2), primarily found as a by-product of historical lime kilns. This substrate has distinctive chemical properties that make it inhospitable to most other plant species: it contains concentrated levels of magnesium from the burning process, has a high magnesium:calcium ratio that limits potassium uptake in plants, and has severely limited phosphorus availability and very low iron content. The substrate weathers to a characteristic pink colour and has a fine, soft texture.

Tortula cernua requires some protection from desiccation, either through tree cover or shelter by cliffs, though this may be more related to site management than a specific requirement of the species. It is an annual species that relies on spores for reproduction, with spores germinating immediately upon contact with damp soil under laboratory conditions. The species can persist at suitable sites for long periods but is a poor competitor and can be overwhelmed by other bryophytes such as Didymodon tophaceus and vascular plants. Within sites, populations can move around over time.

The species' long-term survival in Britain is dependent on historic sites, as the highly alkaline lime kiln waste substrate is no longer produced and cannot legally be dumped in the environment without special consent. While the species temporarily appeared in the 1960s on lime waste from the salt-based chemical industry at Plumley Lime Beds in Cheshire, it is no longer present at that site.
