= Trematodon ambiguus =

Scientific classification
- Kingdom: Plantae
- Division: Bryophyta
- Class: Bryopsida
- Subclass: Dicranidae
- Order: Bruchiales
- Family: Bruchiaceae
- Genus: Trematodon
- Species: T. ambiguus

Binomial name
- Trematodon ambiguus Hornschuch, 1819

Species of moss

Trematodon ambiguus is a species of moss belonging to the family Bruchiaceae.

It has almost cosmopolitan distribution.

In Iceland, the species has been found at only two locations and is listed as and endangered species (EN).
