= Tortula paulsenii =

Scientific classification
- Kingdom: Plantae
- Division: Bryophyta
- Class: Bryopsida
- Subclass: Dicranidae
- Order: Pottiales
- Family: Pottiaceae
- Genus: Tortula
- Species: T. paulsenii

Binomial name
- Tortula paulsenii Broth.

Species of moss

Tortula paulsenii is a leaf moss species described by Viktor Ferdinand Brotherus in 1906. Tortula paulsenii is included in the Pottiaceae family. No subspecies are listed in Catalog of Life.
