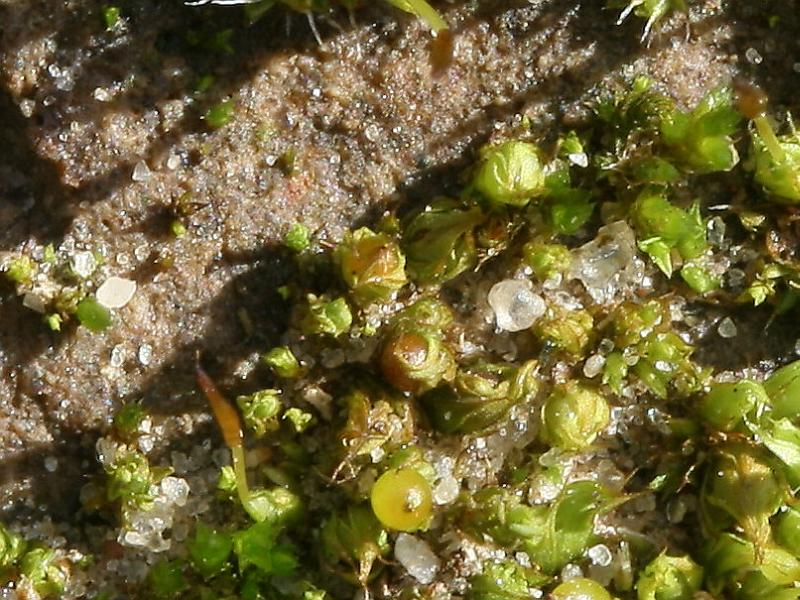

Scientific classification
- Kingdom: Plantae
- Division: Bryophyta
- Class: Bryopsida
- Subclass: Dicranidae
- Order: Pottiales
- Family: Pottiaceae
- Genus: Tortula
- Species: T. acaulon

Binomial name
- Tortula acaulon (With.) R.H. Zander

Synonyms
- Phascum cuspidatum Hedw.

= Tortula acaulon =

Cuspidate earth-moss

Species of moss

Tortula acaulon, formerly Phascum cuspidatum, the cuspidate earth-moss or toothed phascum moss, is a moss with 3 mm leaves which forms green patches. It is very common and has a number of varieties in a wide range of habitats. The variety piliferum occurs on sandy soils near the sea.
