= Bruchia bolanderi =

Conservation status
- Imperiled (NatureServe)

Scientific classification
- Kingdom: Plantae
- Division: Bryophyta
- Class: Bryopsida
- Subclass: Dicranidae
- Order: Bruchiales
- Family: Bruchiaceae
- Genus: Bruchia
- Species: B. bolanderi

Binomial name
- Bruchia bolanderi Lesq.

Species of haplolepideous moss

Bruchia bolanderi (known as Bolander's candlemoss or Bolander's pygmymoss) is a rare plant of the Western U.S.: Oregon, California, and Nevada. It grows on very damp bare soil. One may distinguish it from other mosses by the capsules, which are shaped like little upside-down pear fruits.

== Technical description ==
The plants are tiny, erect, and acrocarpous, with stems and capsules together only 5.1–12 mm tall. The leaves are short, costate (but awn not filled by costa), linear, narrowly acuminate to subulate, serrulate, and green to light brown in color. The seta are straight, long-exserted, and 1.6–5.4 mm. long, usually longer than 3 mm. The hypophysis are as long as the urn. The capsules' are the most conspicuous part of the plants, and are long exserted above the perichaetial leaves, and tend to be 1.9–3.0 mm long, light brown, beige to greyish at maturity, widest at the rounded top, with a long tapering neck. The calyptra is smooth. There is no obvious area of dehiscence, and peristome teeth are lacking. The spores are papillose or warty.

== Distribution, habitat, and ecology ==
Endemic to western North America: Oregon, California, and Nevada. In California, found as far south as Tulare County, but not west of the Central Valley.

Bolander's candlemoss may be found in wet places such as meadows and the banks of streams, growing on at least partially organic soil. Where there is a recent disturbance, such as a newly eroded streambank, it will form large colonies, but will otherwise be found growing singly amongst grasses. It is a mountain species, found at elevations of 5,575 to 9,200 ft. It likes to live within lodgepole (Pinus contorta) forest, and is associated with the mosses Aulacomnium palustre and species of Pohlia.

The fire ecology of this plant is not known. This moss responds well to disturbance, but the fire would have to go through wet habitats that probably do not carry fire well.

== Conservation status and threats ==
U.S. Forest Service Pacific Southwest Region Sensitive Species.

California Native Plant Society List 2.2

NatureServe California State Rank: S2.2; Global Rank: G2

Although, as an opportunistic species, it can tolerate some disturbance, continued trampling along forest trails due to recreation poses a threat.

== Field identification ==
The best time of year to look for this plant is during the summer. One may best distinguish this moss from others when its upside-down pear-shaped capsule atop a somewhat long seta is visible; under a microscope, warty spores will also verify its identity. While without capsules, B. bolanderi can appear very similar to Leptobryum pyriforme.
