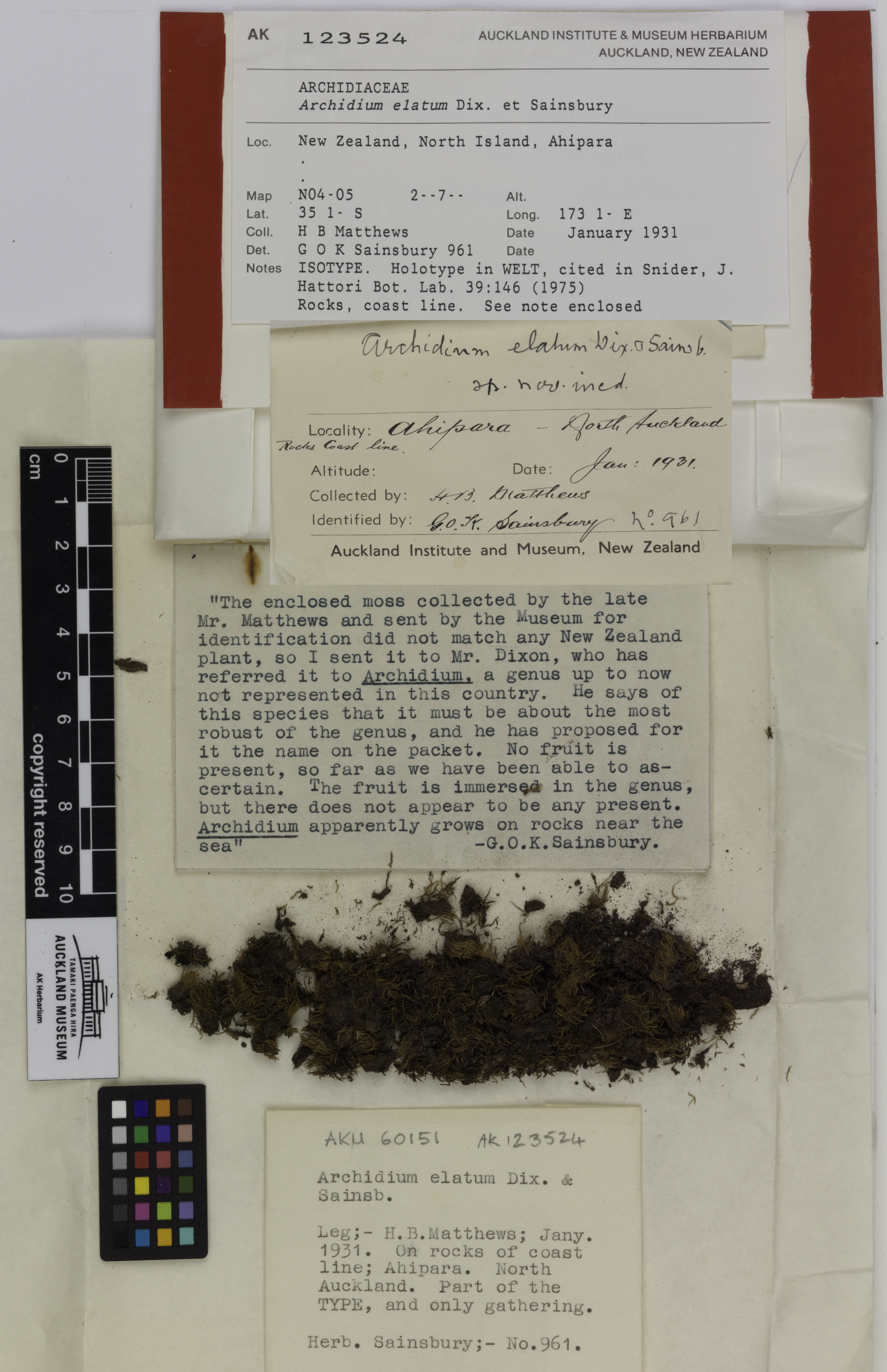

Conservation status
- Near Threatened (IUCN 3.1)

Scientific classification
- Kingdom: Plantae
- Division: Bryophyta
- Class: Bryopsida
- Subclass: Dicranidae
- Order: Archidiales
- Family: Archidiaceae
- Genus: Archidium
- Species: A. elatum

Binomial name
- Archidium elatum Dixon & Sainsbury

= Archidium elatum =

Species of moss

Archidium elatum is a species of moss in the family Archidiaceae. It is native to New Zealand, where it occurs on the North Island and Chatham Island, and Australia, where it can be found in Queensland and New South Wales.

This moss grows on wet basalt and other coastal rock formations. In some areas it is associated with Campylopus introflexus, Ceratodon purpureus, Disphyma australe, and Astelia banksii.

This moss was thought to be endemic to New Zealand but it has recently been found in Australia. In New Zealand it is listed as a 'Nationally Vulnerable' species under the New Zealand Threat Classification System.

== Physical characteristics ==
Archidium elatum is dark green, or brown, sometimes yellow green plant moss.

Plants forming turves, dark green or dark brown below, apparently sometimes yellow-green above (living material not seen). Stems to 18 mm, much branched, often with a distinctly zig-zag appearance, the branches often arising from old perichaetia in clusters of 2–4. Leaves of lower stem triangular-lanceolate, appearing rigid, c. 1.0–1.2 × 0.25–0.3 mm, erect-spreading; mid laminal cells firm-walled and oblong-rectangular, smooth, c. 24–39 × 9–12 μm, those in the basal corners gradually becoming short-rectangular or quadrate, c. 10–15 × 12 μm and extending up the leaf margins in 2–4 rows; costa stout, occupying a third or more of leaf base, percurrent or ± filling the upper third of leaf and short excurrent, in cross-section lacking stereids or other differentiated cells; leaves of innovations sometimes longer (c. 1.4–1.5 mm) and more wide-spreading. Perichaetial leaves c. 1.2 × 0.25 mm, triangular-lanceolate or lanceolate from a ± ovate base, plane or weakly recurved, entire. Perigonia not seen. Capsules unknown.

Distribution NI: N Auckland (Ahipara, Moturoa I. and associated Black Rocks); Ch (Ōtauwae Covenant). Endemic.

Habitat On coastal rocks, especially basalt. At Black Rocks the best documented collections came from damp or waterlogged depressions on an exposed basalt platform on the Northwest Crater Rim (one of the Black Rocks), where it was associated with Campylopus introflexus and Ceratodon purpureus†and the flowering plants Disphyma australe and Astelia banksii. At the Ōtauwae Covenant site this species (fide P.J. de Lange) was a "dark brown wispy moss" growing "extremely exposed to southerly storms". It grew "amongst basalt cobbles, saprolite, and on the margins of semi-permanent pools within [the] drip zone [of a] steep overhanging basalt bluff".

Notes Archidium elatum is one of least known mosses in the New Zealand flora. The type collection from Ahipara was made in 1931. At Ahipara "most of the likely habitat is now invaded by kikuyu grass Pennisetum clandestinum and it is possible [that A elatum] is no longer present at the type locality" (J.E. Beever, pers. comm., Oct. 1994). The Moturoa Is and Northwest Crater Rim collections from the Bay of Islands were made in 1990 by Beever and Beever (four collections in total). A single, well-documented collection from the Ōtauwae Covenant ("toward Ōtauwae Point") on Chatham I. was made by P.J. de Lange in 2006. While it is impossible to know whether A elatum was more common in the past, reduction in its range and habitat since its original discovery is likely. Archidium elatum is listed as a "nationally vulnerable" and "data poor" species in the 2010 edition of the N.Z. Department of Conservation's bryophyte species threat classification ranking (Glenny et al. 2011).

Recognition Unfortunately known only from non-fruiting material, this species is exceedingly inconspicuous and possibly overlooked at other coastal sites. It is best recognised by its formation of numerous innovative branches, the zig-zag appearance of its stems, its ± wide-spreading, strongly costate leaves, and its occurrence on coastal rocks. Under the microscope, the numerous short rectangular or quadrate cells at the basal margins, extending some distance up the lower margins, are among its most distinctive features. Strips of stem cortical cells typically adhere to the costal base when leaves are removed. The large and thin-walled central cells of the stem cross-section also facilitate its recognition. In one of the Moturoa specimens (Beever, 23 January 1990, CHR 462057) stem cross-sections appear to show a weak tendency to form a central strand, but this does not appear to be the case in other collections. In the type collection the leaves of the innovations are longer (c. 1.4–1.5 mm) and more widespread than those of the lower stems, while in the Moturoa, Crater Rim, and Ōtauwae collections the "innovations" are not associated with perichaetia and have leaves equal to or somewhat smaller than the lower stems.

Etymology The epithet means tall and presumably refers to the tall stature of this species relative to its congeners.

3

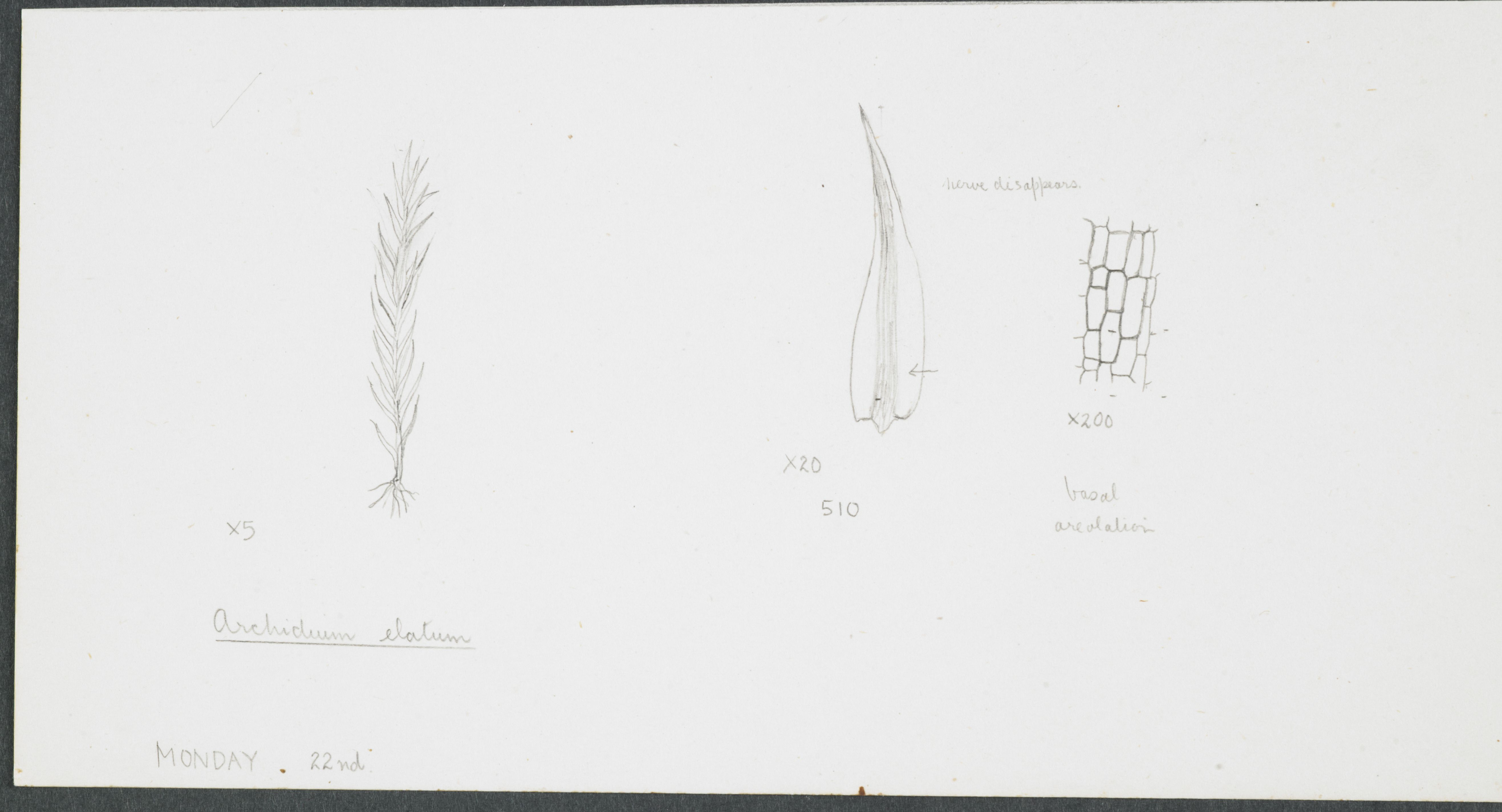
Archidiaceae - Archidium elatum, by Nancy Adams CBE. Purchased 2007. © Te Papa. CC BY 4.0. Te Papa (CA000888/043/0067)

Archidium elatum Dix. and Sains., Trans. Roy. Soc. of N.Z., 75: 169, 1945.

Very robust for the genus. Dull-yellow plants forming dense tufts on rock. Stems 1 cm. high or more, simple or sparingly branched, scarcely comose; with lax foliage. Leaves 1-5-1-75 mm. long, erecto-patent above, more widely spreading below, from a widened base lanceolate-subulate, concave, entire or indis-tinetly crenulate towards the apex; margins plane or rather narrowly recurved. Nerve rather strong, continued to the apex. Middle and upper cells 30–55 by 9–11, oblong-rhomboid, firm-walled, smooth; cells below shorter, subquadrate or shortly rectangular. Barren. Distribution: Endemic. This species, probably the most robust of the genus, was collected by H. B. Matthews on coastal rocks at Ahipara, Northland, and has not been rediscovered.

The basal subquadrate cells occupy a substantial part of the lamina, and contrast with the longer cells above.

— G. O. K. Sainsbury, F.L.S., A handbook of New Zealand mosses, 68
