= Bryoxiphium madeirense =

Conservation status
- Endangered (IUCN 3.1)

Scientific classification
- Kingdom: Plantae
- Division: Bryophyta
- Class: Bryopsida
- Subclass: Dicranidae
- Order: Bryoxiphiales
- Family: Bryoxiphiaceae
- Genus: Bryoxiphium
- Species: B. madeirense

Binomial name
- Bryoxiphium madeirense A.Löve & D.Löve

Species of moss

Bryoxiphium madeirense is a species of moss in the Bryoxiphiaceae family. It is endemic to the Island of Madeira in the North Atlantic, part of Portugal.

== Distribution and habitat ==
Bryoxiphium madeirense is endemic to Madeira Island, Portugal, with fewer than five known localities and a severely fragmented population. It occurs in moist and dripping volcanic rocks in shaded streams in natural laurel forests, at altitudes between 500 and 1,500 metres (1,600 and 4,900 ft).
