= Pseudoditrichum =

Scientific classification
- Kingdom: Plantae
- Division: Bryophyta
- Class: Bryopsida
- Subclass: Dicranidae
- Order: Pseudoditrichales
- Family: Pseudoditrichaceae; Steere & Z.Iwatsuki 1974
- Genus: Pseudoditrichum; Steere & Z.Iwatsuki 1974
- Species: P. mirabil

Binomial name
- Pseudoditrichum mirabil Steere & Z.Iwatsuki 1974

Genus of haplolepideous mosses

Pseudoditrichum is a rare North American genus of haplolepideous moss (Dicranidae). It is the only known genus in its family (Pseudoditrichaceae), and there is only one species in the genus. Pseudoditrichum mirabile has been found only in a small area along the Sloan River near Great Bear Lake. This is in the Northwest Territory in northern Canada, only a few kilometers south of the Arctic Circle.

Pseudoditrichum mirabile is unusual in that the combination of the gametophyte features and the sporophyte morphology do not match any other moss family. The entire plant is a mere 3 mm tall, growing on moist silt, generally underneath Populus. It spreads vegetatively by means of spherical underground tubers as well as via narrow, thread-like gemmae. Spores are 15-21 μm long, shed one at a time.
