= Drummondia =

Scientific classification
- Kingdom: Plantae
- Clade: Embryophytes
- Division: Bryophyta
- Class: Bryopsida
- Subclass: Dicranidae
- Order: Scouleriales
- Family: Drummondiaceae
- Genus: Drummondia; Hook.

Genus of haplolepideous mosses

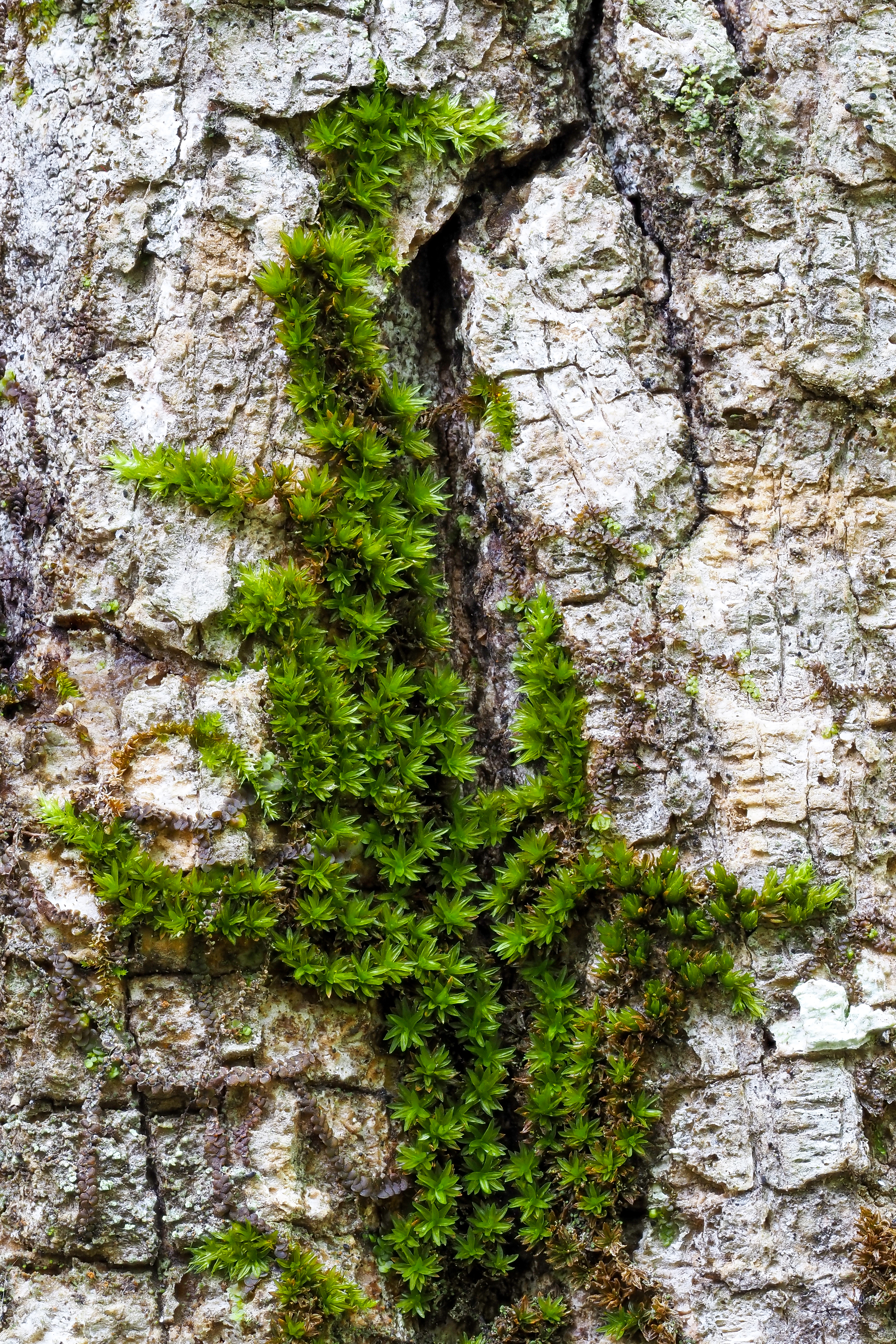
Drummondia prorepens on a trunk

Drummondia is a genus of haplolepideous mosses (Dicranidae) in the monotypic family Drummondiaceae.

The genus name of Drummondia is in honour of Octavio de Almeida Drummond, a Brazilian botanist and phytopathologist in agronomy.

The genus was circumscribed by Augusto Chaves Batista and Heraldo da Silva Maia in 1963.
