= Scouleriaceae =

Scientific classification
- Kingdom: Plantae
- Division: Bryophyta
- Class: Bryopsida
- Subclass: Dicranidae
- Order: Scouleriales
- Family: Scouleriaceae

Genera
- Scouleria Hook. Tridontium Hook.f.

Family of haplolepideous mosses

Scouleriaceae is a family of haplolepideous mosses (Dicranidae) in the order Scouleriales. It comprises two genera, Scouleria and Tridontium.
