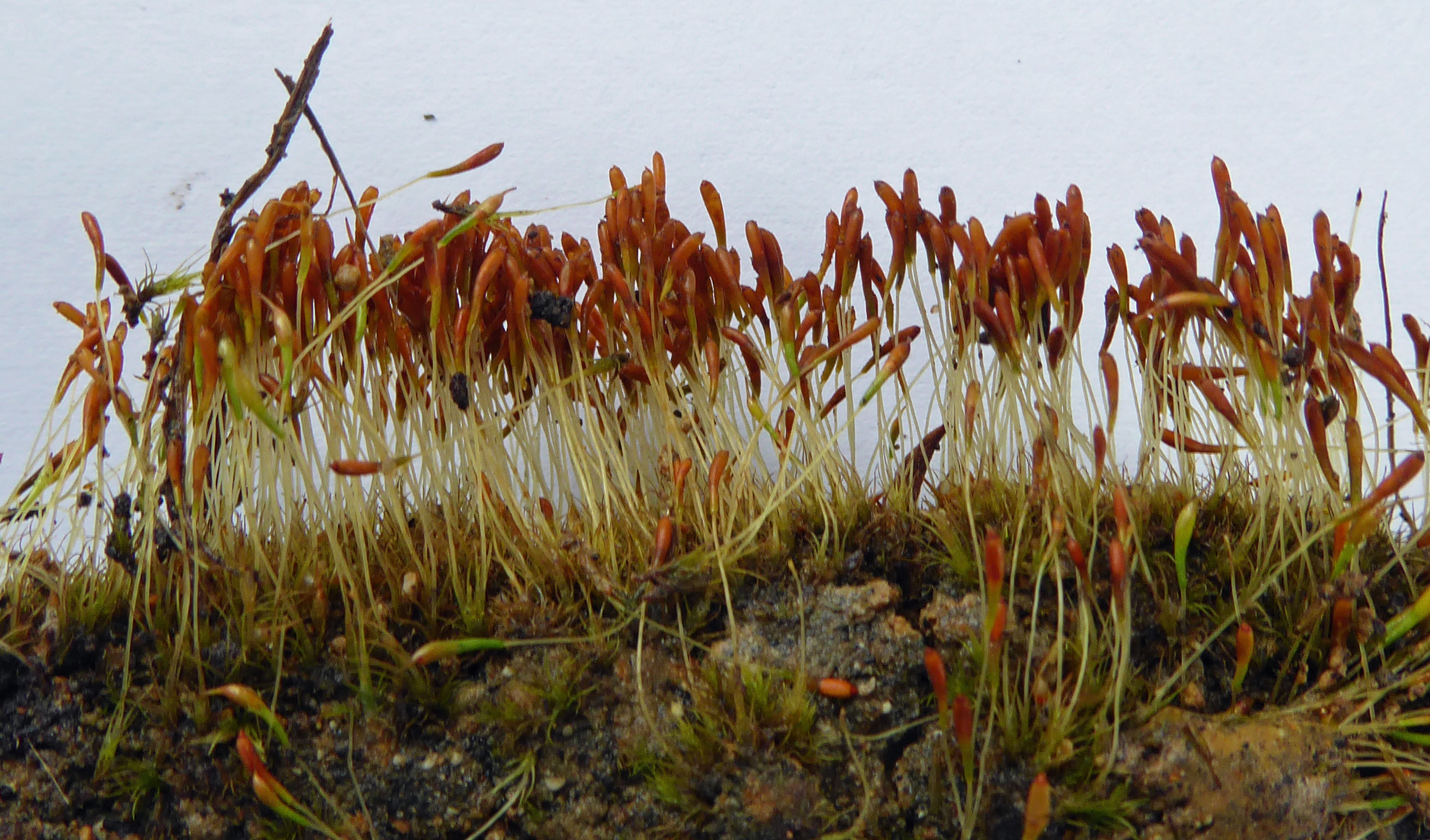
- Trematodon suberectus in New Zealand

Scientific classification
- Kingdom: Plantae
- Division: Bryophyta
- Class: Bryopsida
- Subclass: Dicranidae
- Order: Bruchiales
- Family: Bruchiaceae
- Genus: Trematodon; Michx.

= Trematodon =

Genus of mosses

Trematodon is a genus of moss belonging to the family Bruchiaceae.

The genus was first described by André Michaux.

The genus has cosmopolitan distribution.

Species:

- Trematodon ambiguus Hornschuch, 1819
