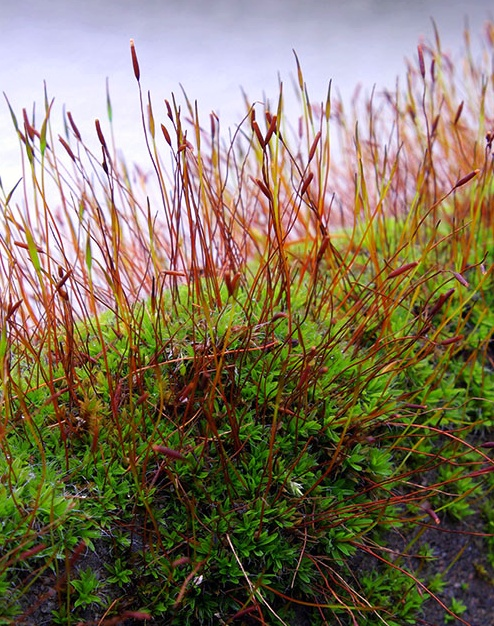
- Tortula muralis

Scientific classification
- Kingdom: Plantae
- Division: Bryophyta
- Class: Bryopsida
- Subclass: Dicranidae
- Order: Pottiales
- Family: Pottiaceae
- Genus: Tortula; Hedw.

Species
- See text

= Tortula =

Genus of mosses in the family Pottiaceae

Tortula is a genus of mosses in the family Pottiaceae.

== Species ==
There are different classifications for the species included in the genus.

The delimitation of genus Tortula is problematic and was subject to a number of alterations in the past. Some species that were earlier placed under Desmatodon, Phascum and Pottia have been made part of genus Tortula, while other species that had been formerly placed in this genus became part of Hennediella, Microbryum and Syntrichia. The rearrangement of the genus followed new studies in gametophyte characteristics.

- Tortula acaulon (With.) R. H. Zander
  - Tortula acaulon var. pilifera (Schreb. ex Hedw.) R.H. Zander
- Tortula ammonsiana Crum & Anderson – Ammons' Tortula Moss
- Tortula amphidiacea (C. Müll.) Broth. – Tortula Moss
- Tortula amplexa (Lesq.) Steere – Tortula Moss
- Tortula antarctica (Hampe) Par. – Screw Moss
- Tortula atrovirens (Sm.) Lindb. – Convolute Desmatodon Moss
- Tortula bartramii Steere in Grout – Bartram's Tortula Moss
- Tortula bolanderi (Lesq.) Howe – Bolander's Tortula Moss
- Tortula brevipes (Lesq.) Broth. – Tortula Moss
- Tortula cainii Crum & Anderson – Cain's Tortula Moss
- Tortula californica Bartr. – California Tortula Moss
- Tortula canescens Mont.
- Tortula caucasica Lindb. ex Broth. – Intermediate Pottia Moss
- Tortula cernua (Huebener) R. H. Zander – Desmatodon Moss
- Tortula chisosa Magill, Delgad. & L.R. Stark – Tortula Moss
- Tortula cuneifolia (Dicks.) Turner
- Tortula freibergii Dixon & Loeske
- Tortula hoppeana (Schultz) Ochyra – Wideleaf Desmatodon Moss
- Tortula lindbergii Kindb. ex Broth. – Lance Pottia Moss
- Tortula lingulata Lindb.
- Tortula marginata (Bruch & Schimp.) Spruce
- Tortula mucronifolia Schwägr. – Mucronleaf Tortula Moss
- Tortula muralis Hedw. – Wall Screw-moss
  - Tortula muralis var. aestiva Brid. ex Hedw.
  - Tortula muralis var. muralis Hedw.
- Tortula obtusifolia (Schwägr.) Mathieu – Obtuseleaf Desmatodon Moss
- Tortula obtusissima (C. Müll.) Mitt. – Obtuse Tortula Moss
- Tortula papillosissima (Copp.) Broth. – Tortula Moss
- Tortula paulsenii Broth.
- Tortula princeps De Not. – Tortula Moss
- Tortula protobryoides R. H. Zander – Pottia Moss
- Tortula rhizophylla (Sak.) Iwats. & Saito – Tortula Moss
- Tortula schimperi Cano, O. Werner & J. Guerra
- Tortula scotteri Zand. & Steere – Scotter's Tortula Moss
- Tortula stanfordensis Steere – Stanford
- Tortula subulata Hedw. – Tortula Moss
- Tortula truncata (Hedw.) Mitt. – Truncate Pottia Moss
