= Serpotortella =

Scientific classification
- Kingdom: Plantae
- Division: Bryophyta
- Class: Bryopsida
- Subclass: Dicranidae
- Order: Pottiales
- Family: Serpotortellaceae; W.D.Reese & R.H.Zander
- Genus: Serpotortella; Dixon

Species
- 2 species (see text)

Genus of haplolepideous mosses

Serpotortella is a genus of haplolepideous mosses (Dicranidae) in the monotypic family Serpotortellaceae in the order Pottiales.

== Species ==
Two species are recognised:

- Serpotortella chenagonii (Renauld & Cardot) W.D. Reese & R.H. Zander
- Serpotortella cyrtophylla (Besch.) W.D. Reese & R.H. Zander
