= Micromitrium =

Scientific classification
- Kingdom: Plantae
- Division: Bryophyta
- Class: Bryopsida
- Subclass: Dicranidae
- Order: Dicranales
- Family: Micromitriaceae; Smyth ex Goffinet & Budke
- Genus: Micromitrium; Austin

Genus of haplolepideous mosses

Micromitrium is a genus of haplolepideous mosses (Dicranidae) in the monotypic family Micromitriaceae . The genus Micrometrium was previously placed in family Pottiaceae in order Pottiales.

== Species ==
The genus contains the following species:

- Micromitrium brisbanicum (Broth.) Crosby
- Micromitrium lacustre (Müll. Hal.) Crosby
- Micromitrium megalosporum Austin
- Micromitrium neocaledonicum (Thér.) Crosby
- Micromitrium perexiguum (Müll. Hal.) Crosby
- Micromitrium subaequinoctale (Broth.) Crosby
- Micromitrium synoicum (James) Austin
- Micromitrium tenerum (Bruch & Schimp.) Crosby
- Micromitrium thelephorothecum (Florsch.) Crosby
- Micromitrium wrightii (Müll. Hal.) Crosby
