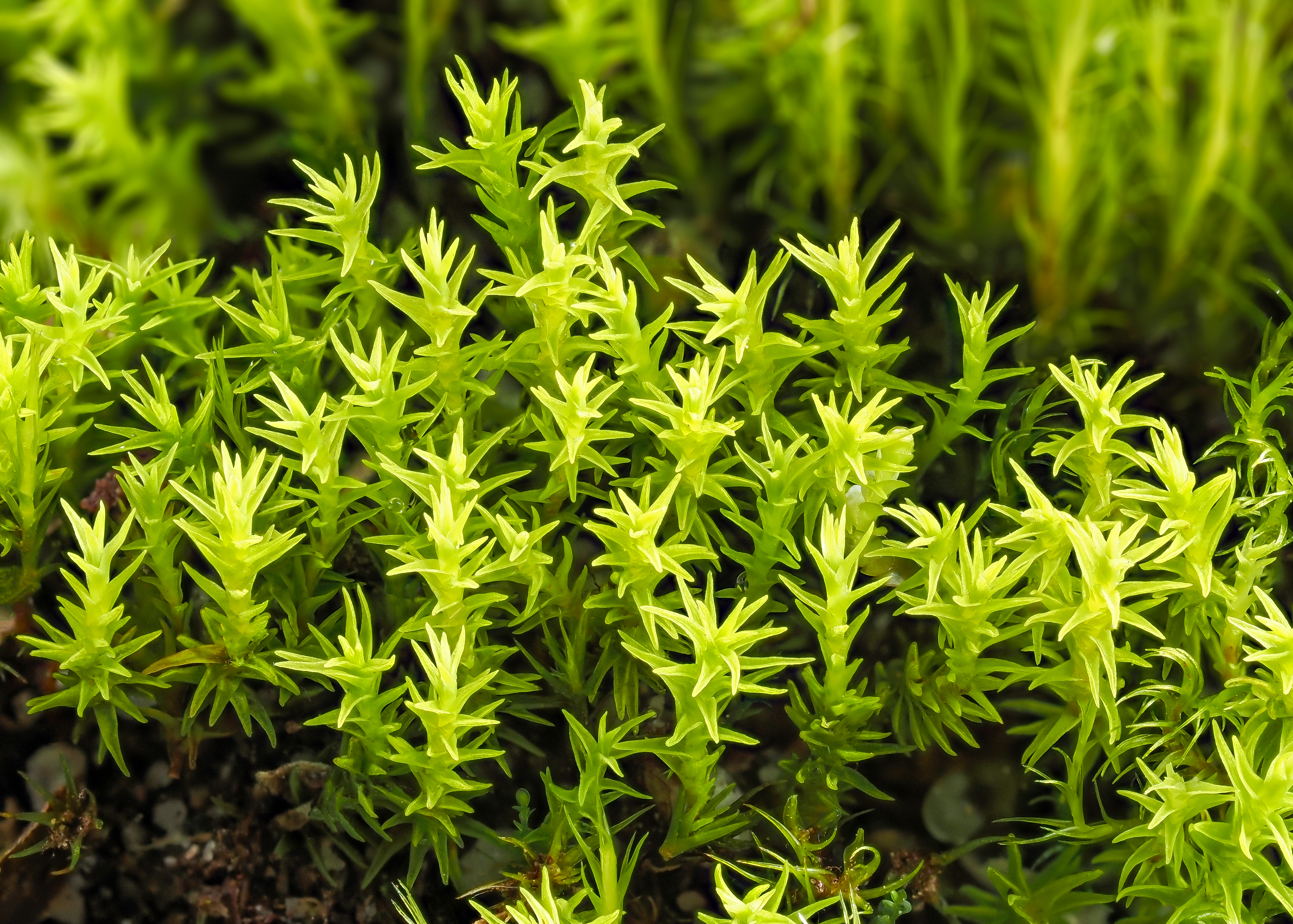
- Chrysoblastella chilensis

Scientific classification
- Kingdom: Plantae
- Clade: Embryophytes
- Division: Bryophyta
- Class: Bryopsida
- Subclass: Dicranidae
- Order: Pseudoditrichales
- Family: Chrysoblastellaceae; Ignatov & Fedosov
- Genus: Chrysoblastella; R.S. Williams

= Chrysoblastella =

Genus of haplolepideous mosses

Chrysoblastella is a genus of haplolepideous mosses (Dicranidae) in the monotypic family Chrysoblastellaceae. The genus was previously placed in the family Ditrichaceae.
