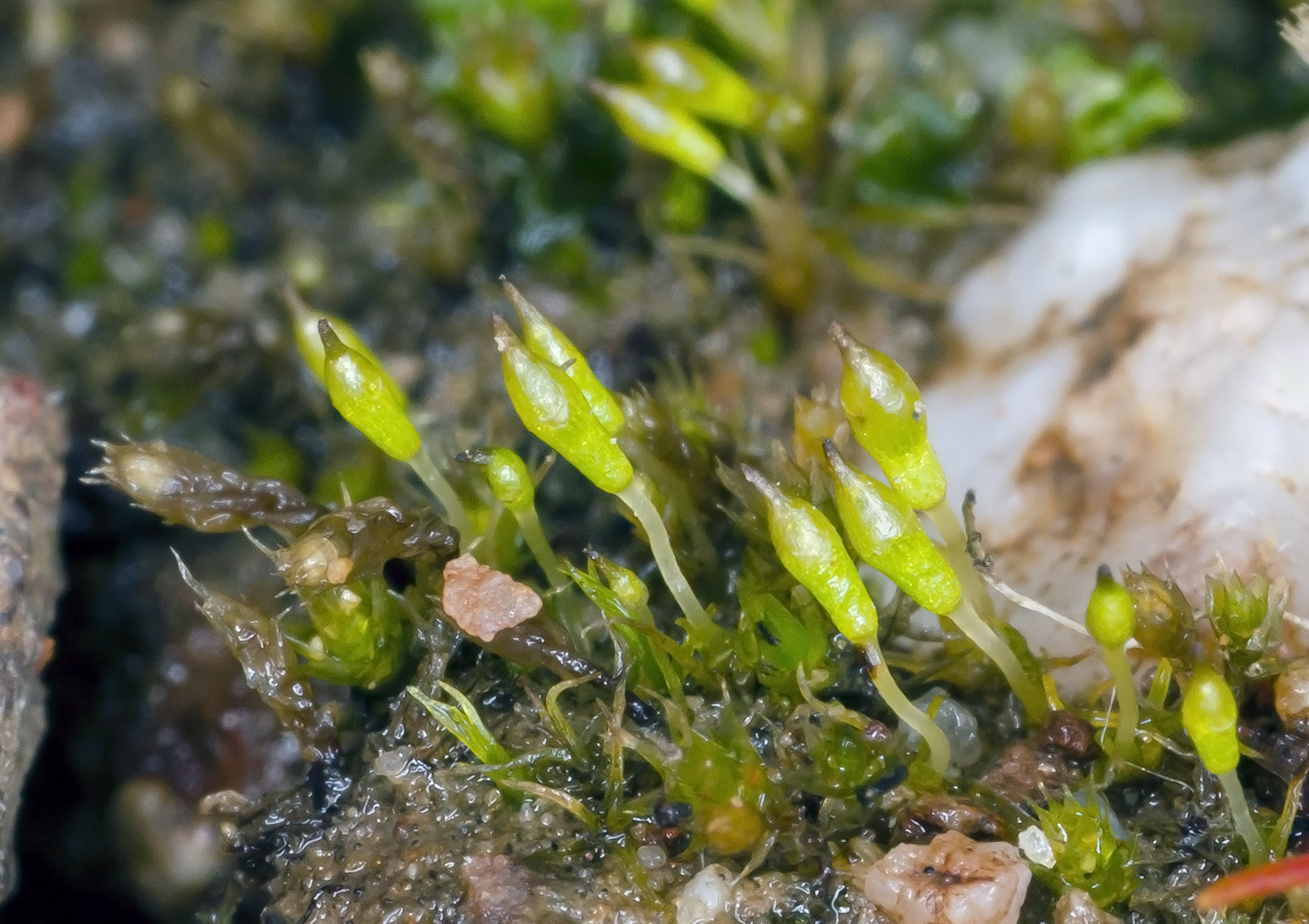
- Bruchia flexuosa - This small moss was photographed on soil near a trail in Middletown Trailside County Park, Lake County, California.

Scientific classification
- Kingdom: Plantae
- Division: Bryophyta
- Class: Bryopsida
- Subclass: Dicranidae
- Order: Bruchiales
- Family: Bruchiaceae
- Genus: Bruchia; Schwägrichen, 1824

Species
- See text

= Bruchia (plant) =

Genus of haplolepideous mosses

Bruchia is a genus of haplolepideous mosses (Dicranidae) in the family Bruchiaceae.

The genus name of Bruchia is in honour of Philipp Bruch (1781–1847), a German pharmacist and bryologist born in Zweibrücken.

The genus was circumscribed by Christian Friedrich Schwägrichen in Sp. Musc. Suppl. Vol.2 (Issue 1) on page 91 in 1824.

== Species ==
- Bruchia aurea
- Bruchia bolanderi
- Bruchia brevifolia
- Bruchia brevipes
- Bruchia carinata
- Bruchia carolinae
- Bruchia drummondii
- Bruchia eckloniana
- Bruchia elegans
- Bruchia flexuosa
- Bruchia fusca
- Bruchia hallii
- Bruchia hampeana
- Bruchia microspora
- Bruchia paricutinensis
- Bruchia queenslandica
- Bruchia ravenelii
- Bruchia sinensis
- Bruchia texana
- Bruchia uruguensis
- Bruchia vogesiaca
