= Bruchia =

Bruchia may refer to:

- Bruchia (beetle), a genus in the tribe Chalepini
- Bruchia (plant), a moss genus in the family Bruchiaceae
