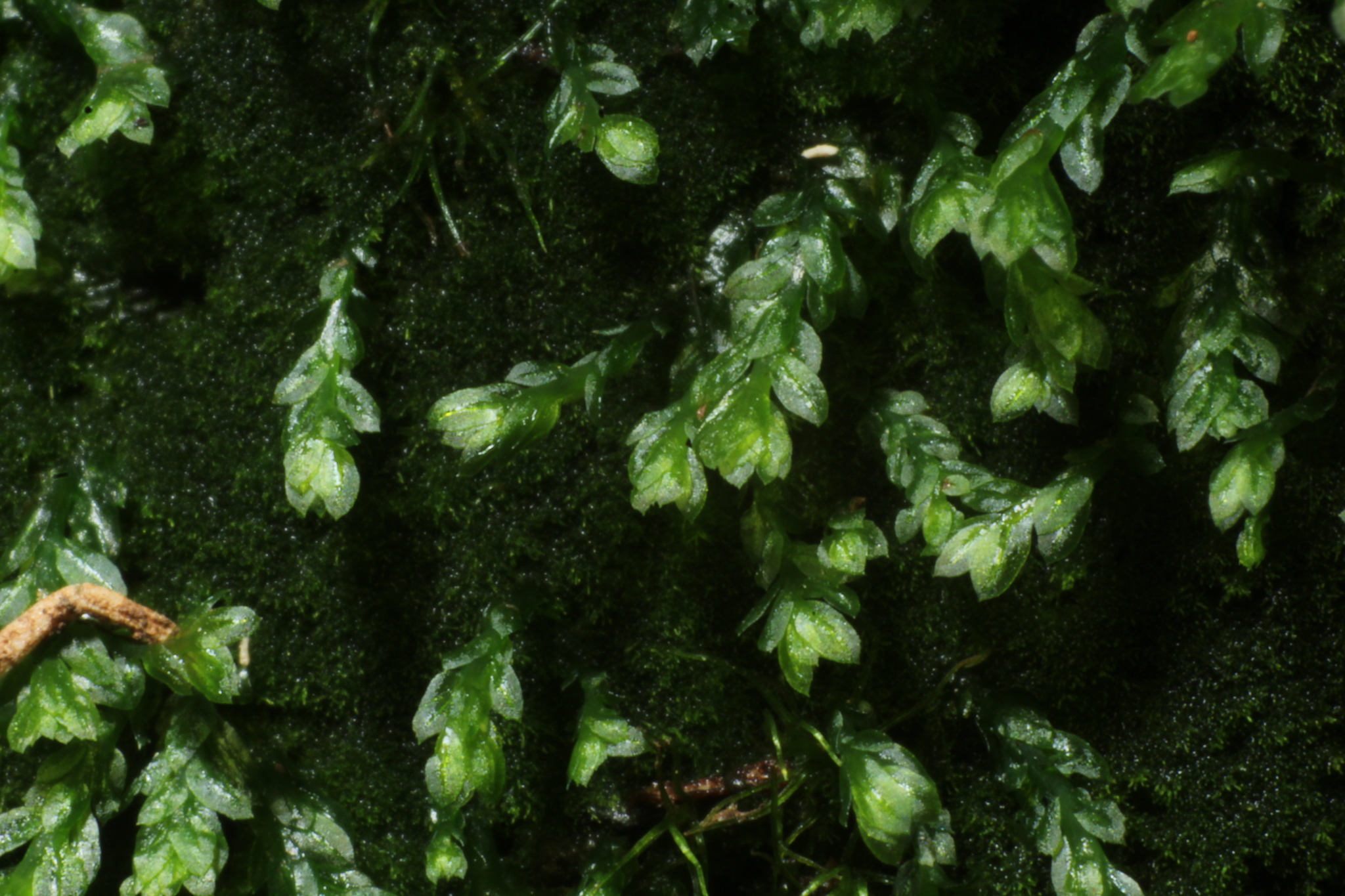

Scientific classification
- Kingdom: Plantae
- Division: Bryophyta
- Class: Bryopsida
- Subclass: Dicranidae
- Order: Mitteniales
- Family: Mitteniaceae; Broth.
- Genus: Mittenia; Lindb.
- Species: M. plumula

Binomial name
- Mittenia plumula (Mitt.) Lindb.

= Mittenia =

Monotypic genus of haplolepideous mosses

Mittenia is a genus of haplolepideous mosses (Dicranidae) with a single species, Mittenia plumula, which is the sole representative of the family Mitteniaceae. The family was previously placed in the order Pottiales, but is now placed in its own monotypic order, Mitteniales.

It has luminescent protonema.
