= Hypodontium =

Scientific classification
- Kingdom: Plantae
- Clade: Embryophytes
- Division: Bryophyta
- Class: Bryopsida
- Subclass: Dicranidae
- Order: Dicranales
- Family: Hypodontiaceae
- Genus: Hypodontium; Müll. Hal.

Genus of haplolepideous mosses

Hypodontium is a genus of haplolepideous mosses (Dicranidae) in the monotypic family Hypodontiaceae.
