= Amphidium =

Amphidium may refer to:

- Amphidium (plant), a genus of mosses in the family Rhabdoweisiaceae
- Amphidium (protist), a genus of protists in the family Gymnodiniaceae
- Amphidium, a genus of fungi in the family Collemataceae; synonym of Leptogium
