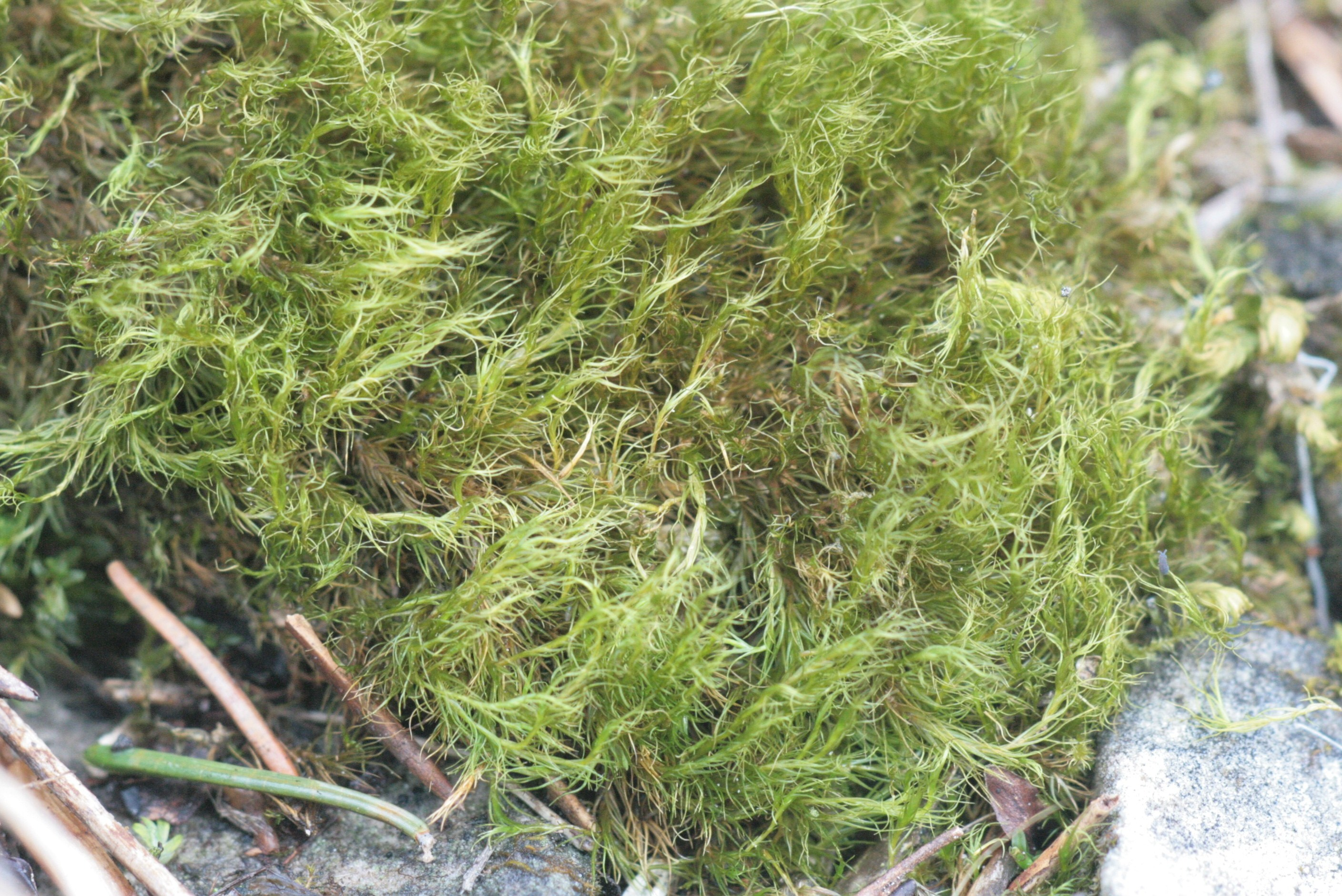
- Flexitrichum flexicaule

Scientific classification
- Kingdom: Plantae
- Division: Bryophyta
- Class: Bryopsida
- Subclass: Dicranidae
- Order: Flexitrichales
- Family: Flexitrichaceae; Ignatov & Fedosov
- Genus: Flexitrichum; Ignatov & Fedosov

= Flexitrichum =

Genus of haplolepideous mosses

Flexitrichum is a genus of haplolepideous mosses (Dicranidae) in the family Flexitrichaceae.

== Species ==
The genus contains two species:

- Flexitrichum flexicaule (Schwägr.) Ignatov & Fedosov
- Flexitrichum gracile (Mitt.) Ignatov & Fedosov

These species were previously considered members of the genus Ditrichum in the family Ditrichaceae, either as two species or both included in Ditrichum flexicaule.
