= Philipp Bruch =

German botanist

- Born: 11 February 1781; Zweibrücken
- Died: 11 February 1847 (aged 66)
- Known for: Bryologia europaea (co-author); describing species in genus Orthotrichum; genus Bruchia named in his honor
- Scientific career
- Fields: Bryology, Pharmacy

Philipp Bruch (11 February 1781 – 11 February 1847) was a German pharmacist and bryologist born in Zweibrücken. His father, Johann Christian Bruch was also a pharmacist.

He initially worked at a pharmacy in Mainz, and afterwards studied in Marburg and Paris. Following the death of his father, he inherited the elder Bruch's pharmacy in Zweibrücken at the age of 21.

Bruch collaborated with Wilhelm Philippe Schimper (1808–1880) on the epic Bryologia europaea, a six-volume work on European bryology. Also, he described a number of species from the moss genus Orthotrichum that received valid publication (Bruch ex Brid.) from Swiss bryologist Samuel Elisée Bridel-Brideri (1761–1828). The genus Bruchia from the family Bruchiaceae is named in his honor.

Bruch died on his birthday at the age of 66.
