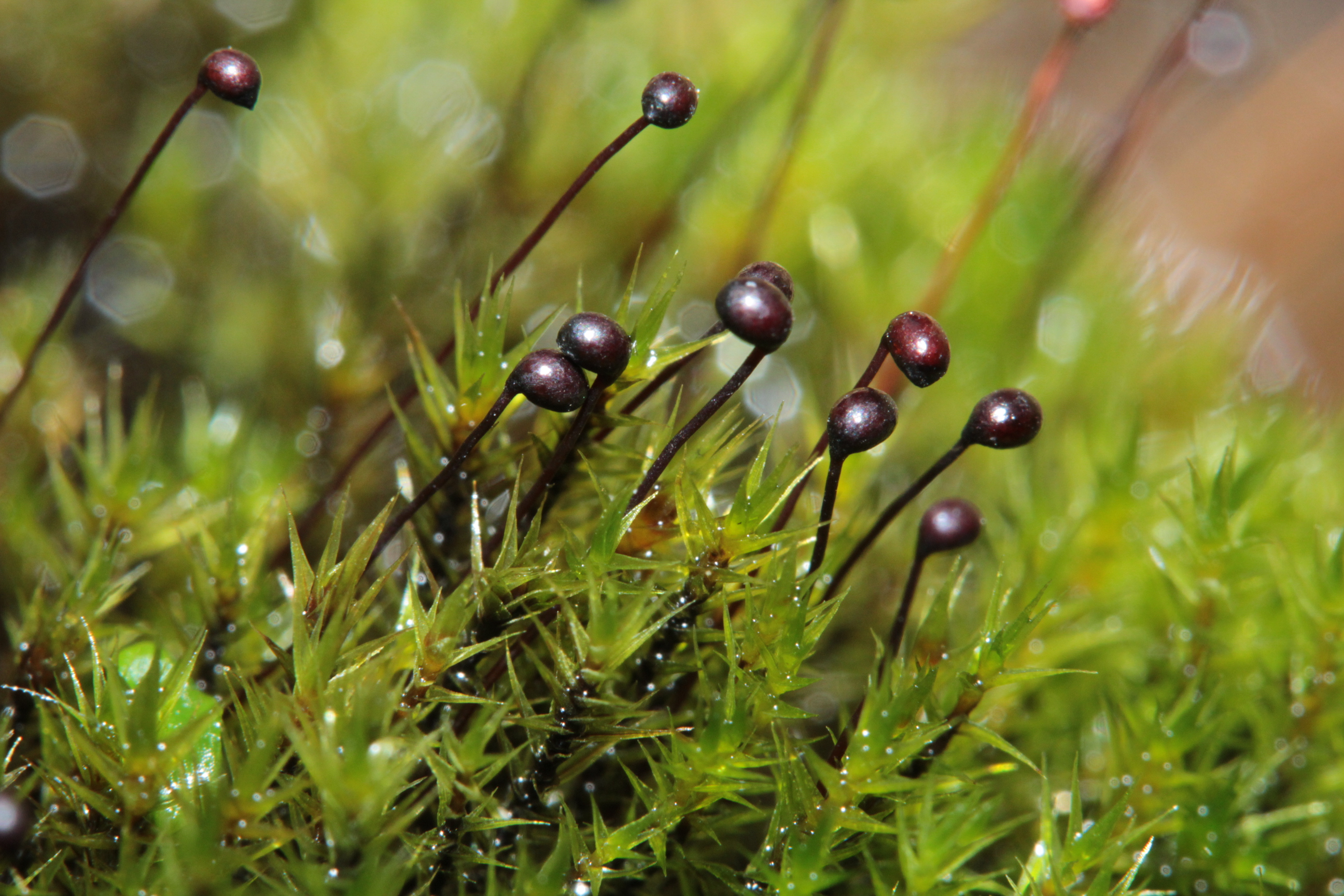

Scientific classification
- Kingdom: Plantae
- Division: Bryophyta
- Class: Bryopsida
- Subclass: Dicranidae
- Order: Catoscopiales; Ignatov & Ignatova
- Family: Catoscopiaceae; Broth.
- Genus: Catoscopium; Brid.
- Species: C. nigritum

Binomial name
- Catoscopium nigritum (Hedw.) Brid.

= Catoscopium =

Genus of haplolepidous mosses

Catoscopium is a genus of haplolepidous mosses (Dicranidae) in the monotypic family Catoscopiaceae and order Catoscopiales. It contains only a single species, Catoscopium nigritum.

== Taxonomy ==
The family Catoscopiaceae has traditionally been considered part order Bryales. However, phylogenetic analyses have found Catoscopium to be the earliest branching group in Dicranidae, as part of a grade of protohaplolepidous lineages. Catoscopiaceae is placed in the monotypic order Catoscopiales.
