= William Bacon Evans =

William Bacon Evans (1875–1964) was a teacher and naturalist from Philadelphia. He graduated from Columbia University, and also attended Rollins College and Harvard University. He was an instructor in French and in Natural History at the Westtown Boarding School. He collaborated with Margaret Sibella Brown on a paper categorizing mosses he had collected in Syria.

His parents were William and Rebecca Carter Evans and was a Quaker.
