= Eustichia =

Scientific classification
- Kingdom: Plantae
- Division: Bryophyta
- Class: Bryopsida
- Subclass: Dicranidae
- Order: Eustichiales; Goffinet
- Family: Eustichiaceae; Broth.
- Genus: Eustichia (Brid.) Brid.

Species
- Eustichia africana; Eustichia longirostra

Genus of haplolepideous mosses

Eustichia is the only genus of moss in family Eustichiaceae. The family was previously place in the order Dicranales, but is now placed in its own monotypic order, Eustichiales.
