= Bryoxiphium =

Scientific classification
- Kingdom: Plantae
- Clade: Embryophytes
- Division: Bryophyta
- Class: Bryopsida
- Subclass: Dicranidae
- Order: Bryoxiphiales; H.A. Crum & L.E. Anderson
- Family: Bryoxiphiaceae; Besch.
- Genus: Bryoxiphium; Mitten 1869

Synonyms
- Bryoziphium Mitten, alternate spelling; Eustichium Bruch & Schimp.

Genus of mosses

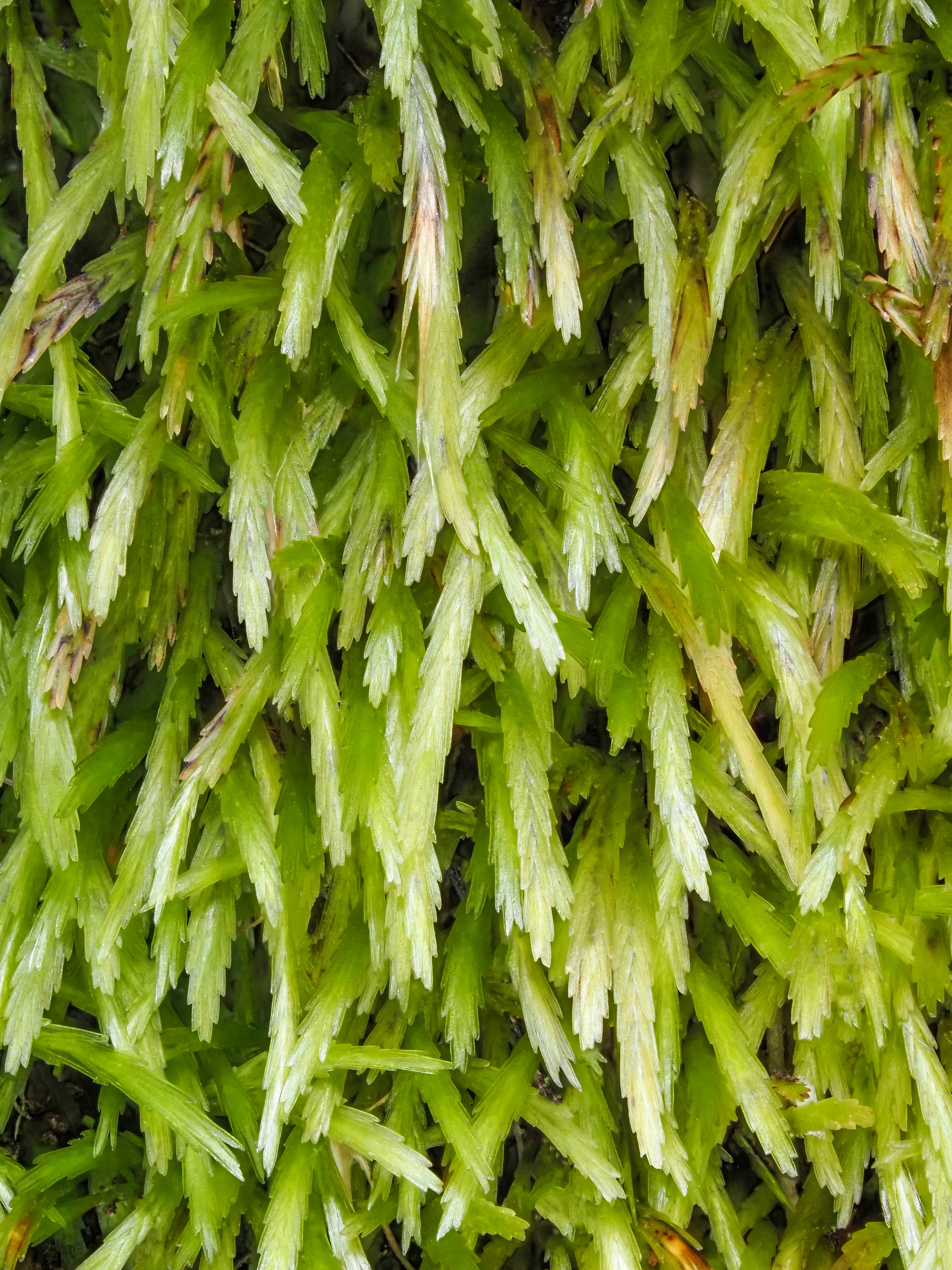
Bryoxiphium madeirense in Lomdo do Mouro, Madeira

Bryoxiphium is the only genus of moss in family Bryoxiphiaceae, described as a genus in 1869.

Bryoxiphium is native to North America, East Asia, and certain islands in the North Atlantic.

Species

1. Bryoxiphium madeirense A. Löve & D. Löve - Madeira
2. Bryoxiphium mexicanum Besch. - Mexico (Jalisco, Distrito Federal, Morelos, Puebla, Veracruz)
3. Bryoxiphium norvegicum (Bridel) Mitten - United States (incl Alaska), Greenland, Iceland, Mexico, Dominican Republic, China, Japan, Korea, Russian Far East
