= Margaret Sibella Brown =

Canadian amateur bryologist (1866–1961)

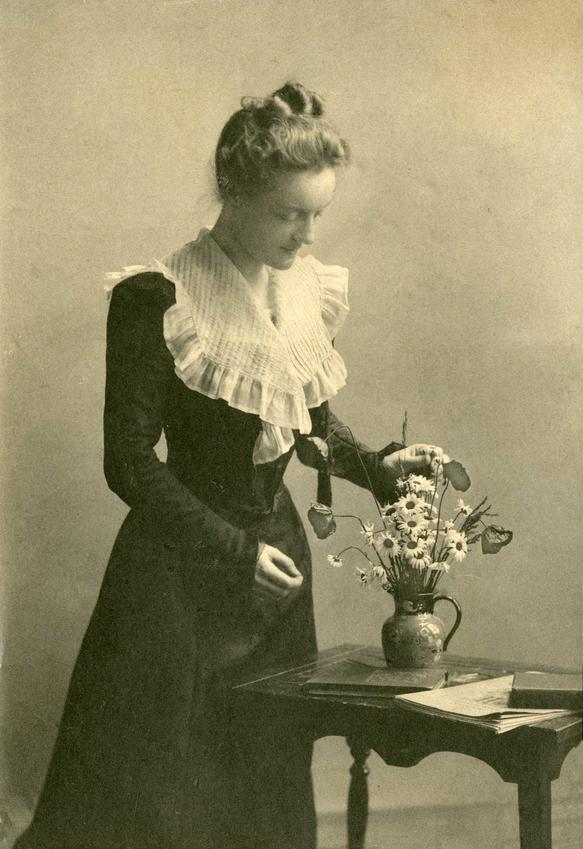
- Born: March 2, 1866; Sydney Mines, Nova Scotia
- Died: November 16, 1961 (aged 95); Halifax, Nova Scotia
- Known for: Contributions to bryology
- Relatives: Sibella Annie Barrington (cousin)
- Awards: Master of Arts (honoris causa), Acadia University (1950)

Margaret Sibella Brown (March 2, 1866 – November 16, 1961) was a Canadian amateur bryologist specializing in mosses and liverworts native to Nova Scotia. Early in her career she was involved with gathering supplies of sphagnum moss to be used as surgical dressings during World War I, when cotton was in short supply. After the war, she researched mosses from around the world, collecting specimens in Europe, the Caribbean, and the United States, as well as her native Canada. She published several papers in academic journals, some on materials she had collected herself and some cataloging samples collected by other investigators. Samples she collected are now housed at several major herbaria in North America and Europe.

Born into upper-class society, Brown was educated in Halifax, Stuttgart, and London. Although lacking formal scientific training, she has been recognized for her contributions to bryology and as an authority on the mosses and liverworts of Nova Scotia. At the age of 84, Brown was awarded an honorary M.A. degree from Acadia University after declining their offer of a Ph.D. She died at her home in Halifax in 1961 aged 95. In 2010, she was inducted into the Nova Scotia Scientific Hall of Fame.

== Family and early life ==
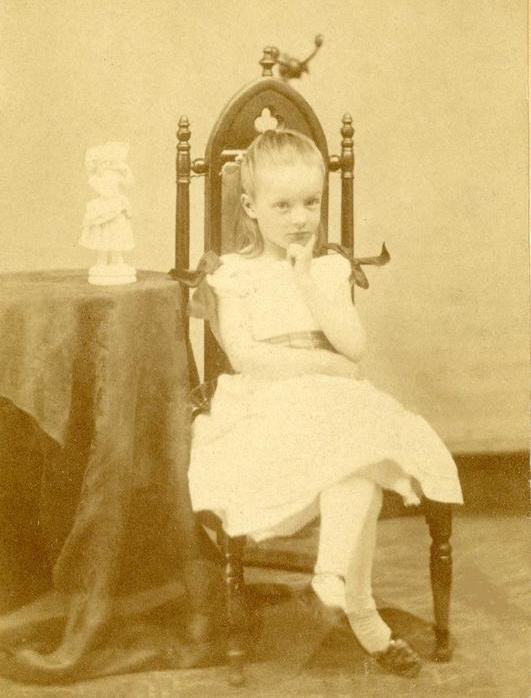
Brown, aged 7

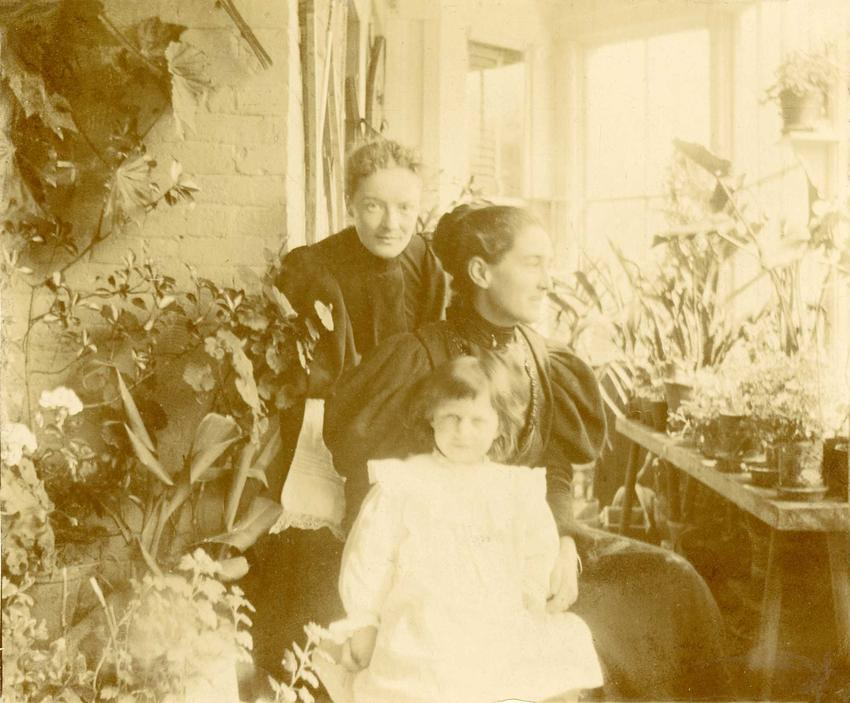
Brown and her twin sister Elizabeth with unidentified child

Margaret Sibella Brown (Note: Brown's middle name is variously spelled Sibella, Sybella, or Sebella, in different sources. Although her death certificate uses Sebella, Sibella is used in this article, as that is the spelling most commonly used in sources talking about her scientific career.) was born on March 2, 1866, in Sydney Mines, Nova Scotia to Barbara (née Davidson, 1842–1898) and Richard Henry (1837–1920) Brown. Margaret and her twin sister Elizabeth were the eldest of five children, followed by Annie, Richard, and Lillian. They lived in a house known as Beech Hill which had been built by their grandfather in 1826; it was the Brown family home until 1901.

Richard Henry was the general manager of the General Mining Association coal mines there, as had been his father Richard (1805–1882) before him. The elder Richard was a fellow of both the Geological Society of London and the Royal Geographical Society and wrote several books on the history of Cape Breton and the region's coal industry.

Brown's early education was at the Anglican School for Girls and King's College in Halifax, from which she graduated with a bachelor of arts degree. She then attended the Anglo-German Institute, a finishing school in Stuttgart, Germany, from 1883 to 1884, after which she took classes in French and china painting in London. Upon returning to Nova Scotia in 1885, she studied at the Victoria School of Art and Design (now NSCAD University). Brown never married. In a biography of early Nova Scotian families, Mary Byers wrote: "A descendant claimed that the rarefied atmosphere of their social position in Sydney Mines may have made it difficult for the Browns to find an acceptable mate."

== Scientific career ==
As a bryologist, Brown mainly collected and classified mosses and liverworts native to Nova Scotia. In a 2024 monograph, Basquill et al. said, "Brown added a wealth of knowledge on Nova Scotia bryophytes, documenting dozens of new species and hundreds of new locations for known species". Most of her work was in Cape Breton, but she also collected specimens from Trinidad, Puerto Rico, Spain, France, and Jamaica working with New York Botanical Garden co-founder Nathaniel Lord Britton, his wife and Sullivant Moss Society co-founder Elizabeth Gertrude Britton, and British botanist Joseph Edward Little as co-collectors of specimens. Brown went on an expedition to Coamo Springs, Puerto Rico, with Elizabeth and Nathaniel Britton in January 1922. A report of that expedition was published in the Journal of the New York Botanical Garden upon their return in April detailing "some 4000 specimens included in 1304 field numbers". (Note: A field number identifies a set of specimens collected at a specific place and time.) A species of herb discovered there, Pilea margarettae (Margarett's clearweed) was named in her honor.

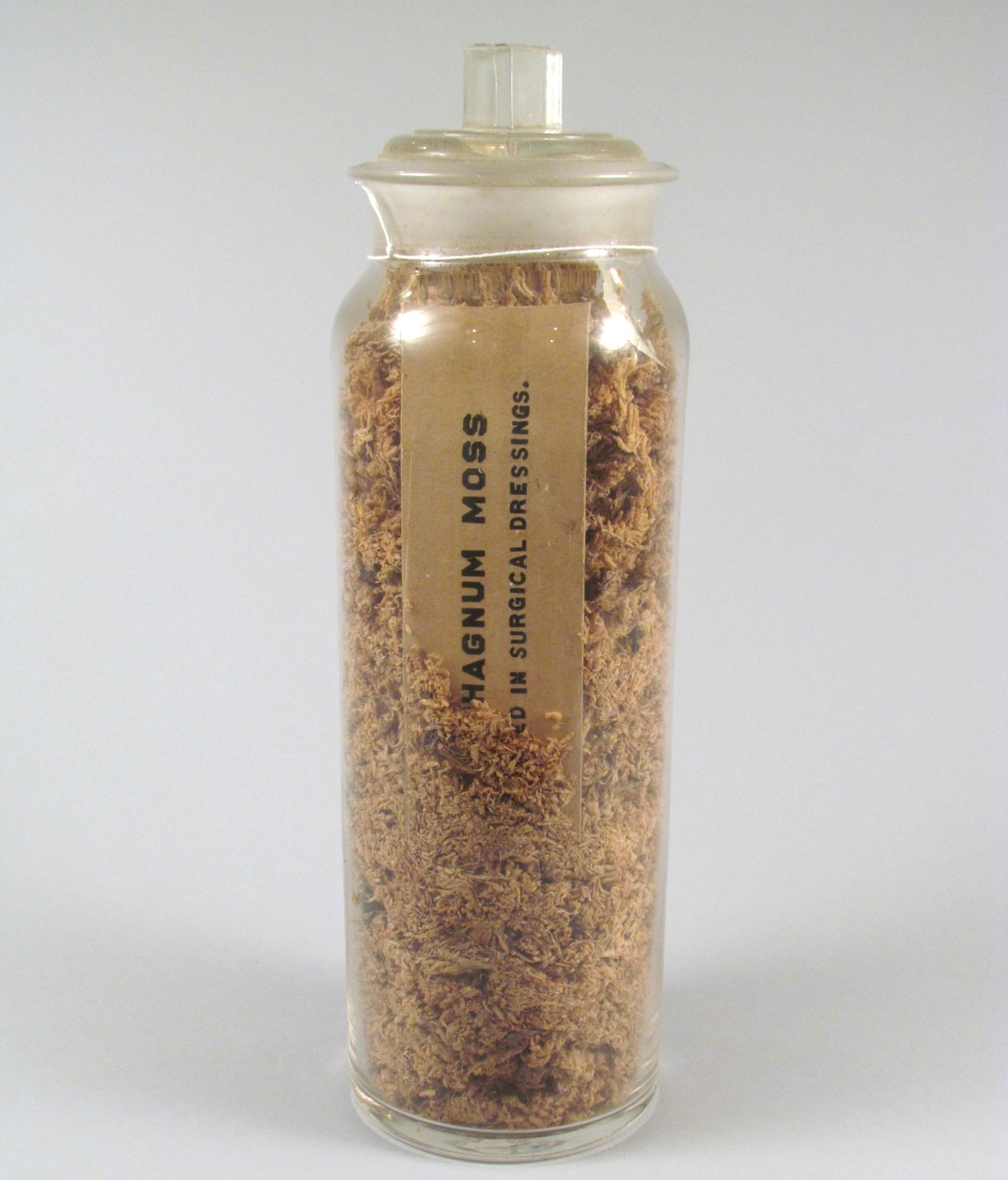
Sample of sphagnum for use as a surgical dressing

During Brown's lifetime, women scientists were uncommon. Her scientific career began during World War I while she was the honorary secretary of the Halifax branch of the Canadian Red Cross Society and was serving as a Voluntary Aid Detachment nurse. Due to a shortage of cotton for making surgical dressings, the use of sphagnum moss was explored as a replacement. Sphagnum species such as S. imbricatum and S. palustre had been used as a dressing since the Bronze Age and became widely used during the war when it was observed to inhibit the development of gas gangrene. At the time, it was believed that this inhibitory effect was due to the moss's ability to absorb up to 25 times its own weight in fluids (3–4 times as much as cotton) but modern research has shown that the moss contains a polysaccharide which interferes with the growth of bacteria as well as reacting with the toxins they produce.

Robert Boyd Thomson, a professor of plant morphology at the University of Toronto, requested that Brown oversee Nova Scotia's efforts to collect the moss, the best Canadian species for this purpose being found in British Columbia and Nova Scotia. Brown and Thomson ran a project in Arichat, producing prepared moss to be used in wound dressings and in ambulance mattresses. After this experience, she went on to publish at least eight scientific papers in the subject.

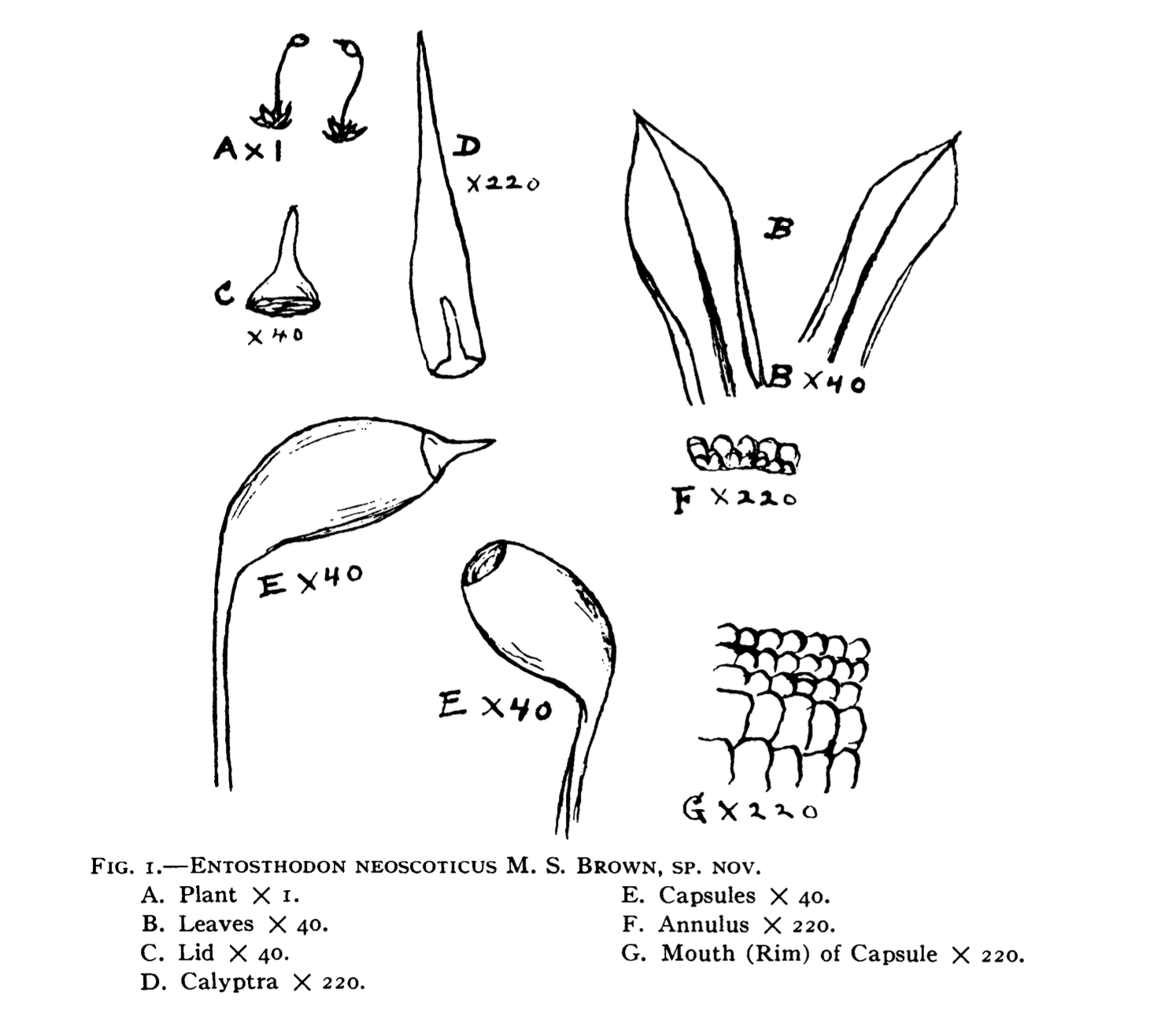
Sketches of Entosthodon neoscoticus from Brown's 1932 paper

Her earliest known paper was a 1924 survey of hepatics (liverworts) found during a winter trip to Thomasville, Georgia, published in The Bryologist when she was 58. A 1932 paper describes a new moss species Entosthodon neoscoticus which she collected in 1928 at Peggy's Cove, Nova Scotia but which was later identified by Crum and Anderson in 1955 as actually being an example of Pottia randii. In 1936, she published an extensive catalogue of Nova Scotian mosses and hepatics listing 25 species discovered since the last such report seven years earlier. A 1937 paper categorized a collection of moss samples gathered in Syria by naturalist William Bacon Evans.

Brown belonged to the Moss Exchange Club (now known as the British Bryological Society) and the Sullivant Moss Society (now known as the American Bryological and Lichenological Society). She was president of the Halifax Floral Society. In a 1950 interview, Brown described her career as a practical botanist:

You just find the little things and bring them home, put them under a glass and classify them ... They all must be classified and, of course, some of them are quite invisible without a microscope.

She insisted that she considered this to be a hobby, albeit a full-time one. Talking about her discovery of Entosthodon neoscoticus, she said:

I found it growing. It looked a little different, so I took it home. We named it "Neo Scotien" because it was native to this province.

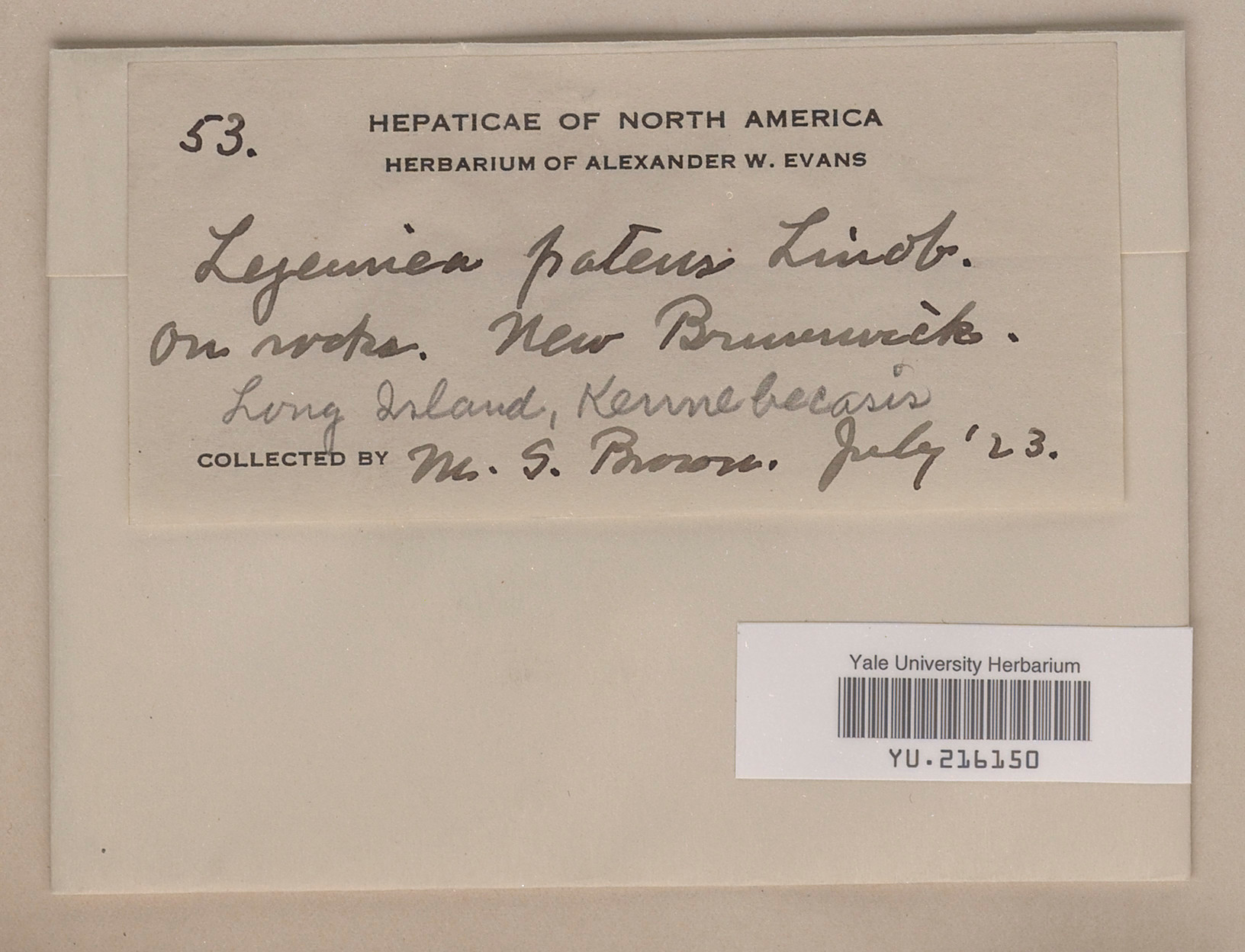
Yale University Herbarium catalogue card which reads Lejeunea patens Lindb. / On rocks. New Brunswick / Long Island, Kennebecaisis / (Collected by) M. S. Brown July '23

The E.C. Smith Herbarium at Acadia University contains her collection of 1779 mosses, 858 hepatics, and 53 lichens. Other Canadian herbaria holding her specimens include Dalhousie University, the New Brunswick Museum, the Nova Scotia Museum of Natural History, and the Devonian Botanical Garden at the University of Alberta. Outside Canada, Brown is represented in the collections of the New York Botanical Garden, the Yale University Herbarium, and the Harvard University Herbaria in the United States as well as the British Museum in London.

== Honours ==
Brown was awarded an honorary M.A. from Acadia University on May 16, 1950, at the age of 84; she had been offered an honorary Ph.D., which she declined in favour of the M.A. The graduation program noted that she was "probably the chief Maritime authority on mosses and liverworts". (Note: Maritime presumably refers to the Maritime provinces.) The degree was conferred in recognition of Brown's gift to the university of her bryophyte collection, donated at the suggestion of her student John Erskine and "in recognition of a long life devoted to this particular specialty". In a 1993 paper, Bruce Bagnell et al described Brown and Erskine as "two keen amateur Nova Scotia bryologists" and the Nova Scotia Museum of Natural History said that they "both made significant contributions to the study of bryophytes in Nova Scotia". Erskine, writing as a curatorial associate at the Nova Scotia Museum in 1968, said:

During the next twenty five years [ca. 1922-1951] Miss Margaret S. Brown carried on the work [the study of Nova Scotia mosses], spending her summers in many parts of the province, and anyone who has learned anything about mosses in this quarter-century owes much to her knowledge and kindness.

In 1934, Brown received an honorary diploma from the Victoria School of Art and Design in recognition her work securing funds to open the Nova Scotia College of Art and Design at a new campus. She later served on their board, and as a member of the education committee. In an invited paper at the 1976 annual meeting of the American Society of Bryology and Lichenology, Brown was listed as one of "the more important North American muscologists and collectors", noting that she was among those who "made the most lasting impact on muscology". (Note: Muscology is a rarely used term for the study of mosses, from the latin muscus.) She was posthumously inducted into the Nova Scotia Scientific Hall of Fame in 2010.

== Death ==
Brown died in her Halifax home of bronchopneumonia secondary to chronic bronchitis on November 16, 1961. There is some question about the date of death; most sources give it as November 15, but her death certificate says November 16. Before she died at the age of 95, she was the oldest living member of the Nova Scotian Institute of Science.

== Publications ==
- Brown, Margaret S. (1924). "Hepatics in Georgia". The Bryologist. 27 (2): 31–34. doi:10.2307/3237493. JSTOR 3237493.
- Brown, Margaret S. (1929). "Bryophytes of Nova Scotia. Additional List". The Bryologist. 32 (3): 50–56. doi:10.2307/3237635. JSTOR 3237635.
- Brown, Margaret S. (1932). "Entosthodon neoscoticus sp. nov.". The Bryologist. 35 (2): 17–18. doi:10.2307/3239791. JSTOR 3239791.
- Brown, Margaret S. (1936). "Bryophytes of Nova Scotia: Additions to Date of Jan. 1936". The Bryologist. 39 (6): 124–126. doi:10.2307/3239379. JSTOR 3239379.
- Brown, Margaret S. (1937). "Mosses from Syria". The Bryologist. 40 (5): 84–85. doi:10.2307/3239666. JSTOR 3239666.
- Brown, Margaret S. (1940). "Ultricularia inflata in Canada". The Canadian Field-Naturalist. 54 (1). Ottawa Field-Naturalists' Club: 44. doi:10.5962/p.340208.
- Brown, Margaret S. (1946). "Bryophytes of Nova Scotia: Addition to July, 1945". The Bryologist. 49 (3): 102–104. doi:10.2307/3239566. JSTOR 3239566.
- Brown, Margaret S. (1951). "Bryophytes of Nova Scotia: Additional List". The Bryologist. 54 (3): 209–213. doi:10.2307/3240305. JSTOR 3240305.
