= Robert Boyd Thomson =

Canadian botanist (1870–1947)

Robert Boyd Thompson (1870–1947) was a Canadian botanist who specialized in spermatophytes. Boyd was a Fellow of the Royal Society of Canada, and was awarded the Flavelle Medal in 1945.

During World War I, Thomson recruited Margaret Sibella Brown, then honorary secretary of the Halifax branch of the Canadian Red Cross, to be in charge of collecting Sphagnum moss for use in surgical bandages, as a replacement for cotton, which was in short supply during the war.
