= Sorapilla =

Scientific classification
- Kingdom: Plantae
- Division: Bryophyta
- Class: Bryopsida
- Subclass: Dicranidae
- Order: Sorapillales; Goffinet
- Family: Sorapillaceae; M.Fleisch.
- Genus: Sorapilla; Spruce & Mitt.

Genus of mosses

Sorapilla is a genus of mosses in the monotypic family Sorapillaceae. The family was previously placed in the order Hypnales, it is now placed in its own order, Sorapillales.

There are two recognised species:

- Sorapilla papuana
- Sorapilla sprucei
