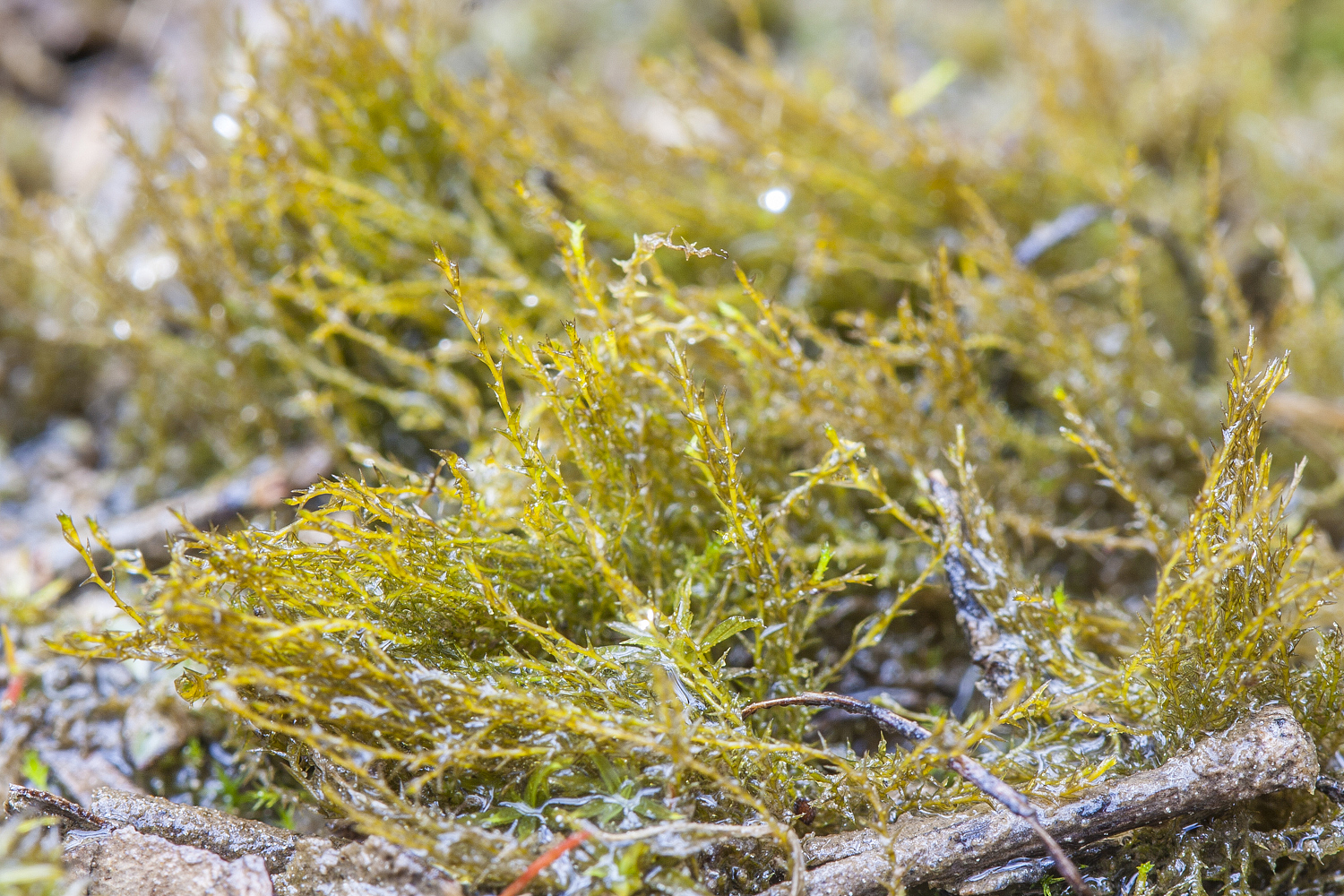
- Archidium alternifolium

Scientific classification
- Kingdom: Plantae
- Division: Bryophyta
- Class: Bryopsida
- Subclass: Dicranidae
- Order: Archidiales; Limpr.
- Family: Archidiaceae; Schimp.
- Genus: Archidium; Brid.

Species
- See text

Synonyms
- Archidiella Irmsch.; Pleuridium Brid.

= Archidium =

Genus of mosses

Archidium is a genus of mosses; it is the only genus in the family Archidiaceae and order Archidiales. Historically, they were considered the only genus in the subclass Archidiidae Engl.

== Classification ==
The following 35 species are recognised in the genus Archidium:

- Archidium acanthophyllum Snider
- Archidium acauloides G. Schwab
- Archidium alternifolium (Dicks. ex Hedw.) Schimp.
- Archidium amplexicaule Müll. Hal.
- Archidium andersonianum Snider
- Archidium birmannicum Mitt. ex Dixon
- Archidium brevinerve P. de la Varde
- Archidium capense Hornsch.
- Archidium clarksonianum I.G. Stone
- Archidium clavatum I.G. Stone
- Archidium crassicostatum D.R. Toren, Kellman & Shevock
- Archidium cubense R.S. Williams
- Archidium dinteri (Irmsch.) Snider
- Archidium donnellii Austin
- Archidium elatum Dixon & Sainsbury
- Archidium hallii Austin
- Archidium indicum Hampe & Müll. Hal.
- Archidium johannis-negrii Tongiorgi
- Archidium julaceum Müll. Hal.
- Archidium julicaule Müll. Hal.
- Archidium laterale Bruch
- Archidium laxirete P. de la Varde
- Archidium microthecium Dixon & P. de la Varde
- Archidium minus (Renauld & Cardot) Snider
- Archidium minutissimum I.G. Stone
- Archidium muellerianum Snider
- Archidium oblongifolium D.F. Peralta, A.B.M. Rios & Goffinet
- Archidium ohioense Schimp. ex Müll. Hal.
- Archidium rehmannii Mitt.
- Archidium rothii Watts ex G. Roth
- Archidium stellatum I.G. Stone
- Archidium subulatum Müll. Hal.
- Archidium tenerrimum Mitt.
- Archidium thalliferum I.G. Stone
- Archidium wattsii (Broth.) I.G. Stone
- Archidium yunnanense Arts & Magill
