= Pseudoditrichales =

Scientific classification
- Kingdom: Plantae
- Division: Bryophyta
- Class: Bryopsida
- Subclass: Dicranidae
- Order: Pseudoditrichales; Ignatov & Fedosov

Families
- Pseudoditrichaceae; Chrysoblastellaceae

Order of haplolepideous mosses

Pseudoditrichales is an order of haplolepideous mosses in the subclass Dicranidae. It comprises two families, Pseudoditrichaceae and Chrysoblastellaceae. Pseudoditrichaceae was previously placed in Bryales, while Chrysoblastellaceae is a new family erected for Chrysoblastella, which was previously placed in Ditrichaceae.
