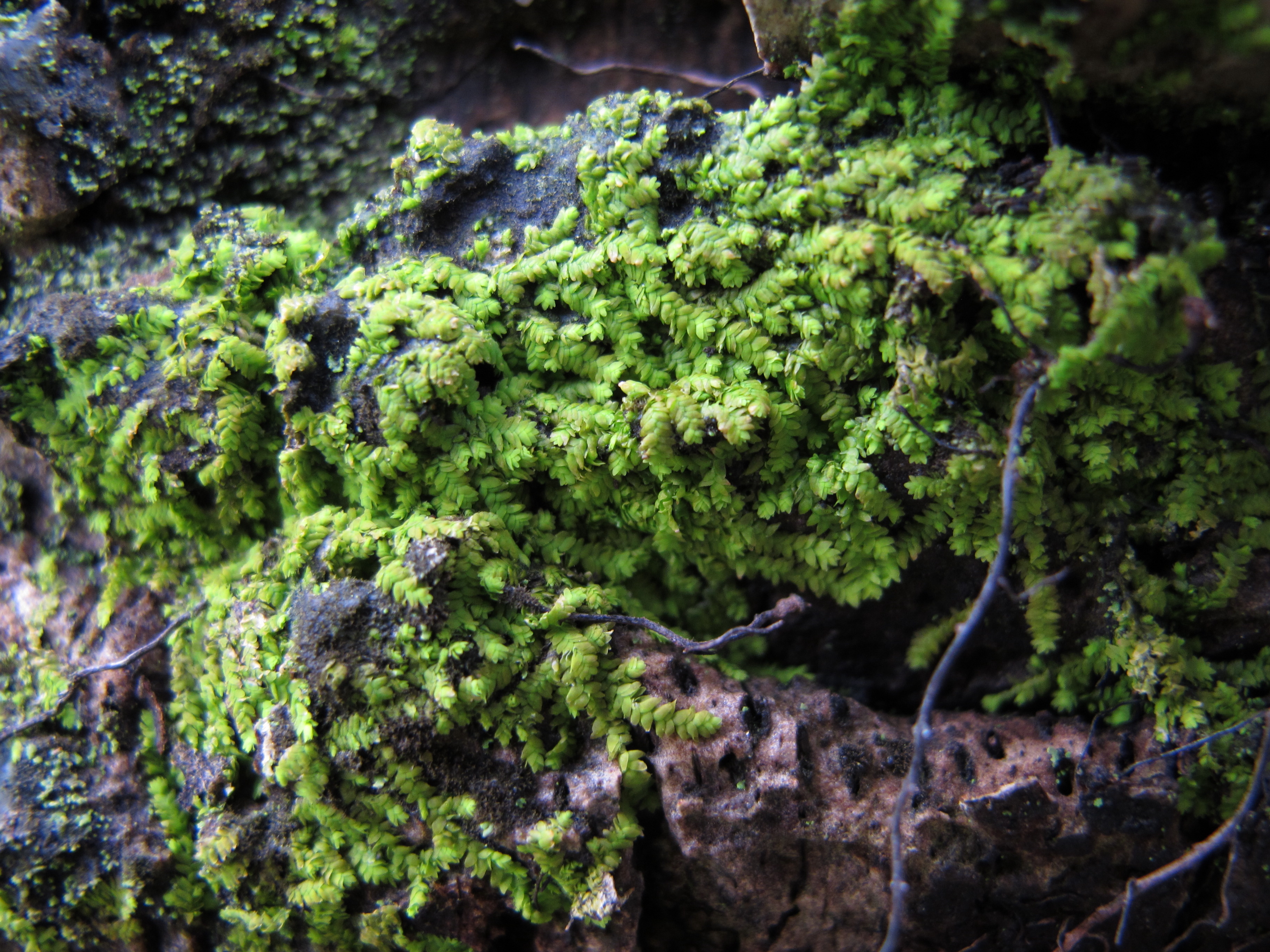
- Erpodium domingense

Scientific classification
- Kingdom: Plantae
- Clade: Embryophytes
- Division: Bryophyta
- Class: Bryopsida
- Subclass: Dicranidae
- Order: Erpodiales
- Family: Erpodiaceae; Broth.

Genera
- Aulacopilum; Erpodium; Solmsiella; Tricherpodium; Venturiella; Wildia

= Erpodiaceae =

Family of haplolepideous mosses

Erpodiaceae is a family of haplolepideous mosses in subfamily Dicranidae. It was formerly placed in order Dicranales, but is now placed in its own monotypic order, Erpodiales.

== Genera ==
The family Erpodiaceae contains five genera:

- Aulacopilum Wilson
- Erpodium (Brid.) Brid.
- Solmsiella Müll. Hal. (including the previously recognised genus Wildia Müll. Hal. & Broth.)
- Tricherpodium (Müll.Hal.) Pursell
- Venturiella Müll. Hal.
