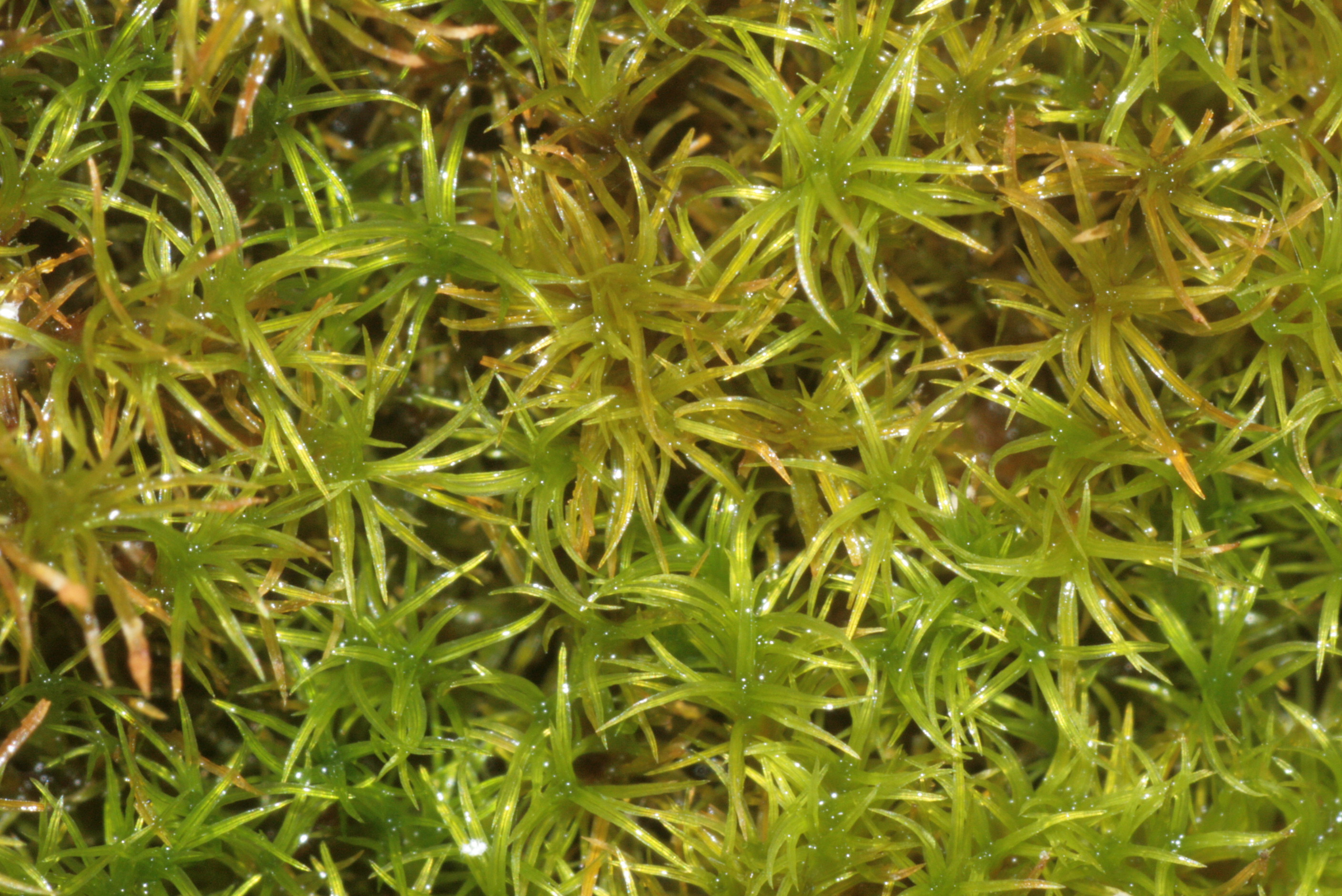
- Amphidium mougeotii

Scientific classification
- Kingdom: Plantae
- Division: Bryophyta
- Class: Bryopsida
- Subclass: Dicranidae
- Order: Amphidiales
- Family: Amphidiaceae
- Genus: Amphidium; Schimp.

= Amphidium (plant) =

Genus of mosses

Amphidium is a genus of mosses belonging to the monotypic family Amphidiaceae. It has previously been placed in families Orthotrichaceae and Rhabdoweisiaceae.

The genus has a cosmopolitan distribution.

Species:

- Amphidium asiaticum Sim-Sim, Afonina & M. Stech
- Amphidium brevifolium Broth.
- Amphidium californicum (Hampe ex Müll. Hal.) Broth.
- Amphidium clastophyllum Cardot
- Amphidium curvipes (Müll. Hal.) Broth.
- Amphidium lapponicum (Hedw.) Schimp.
- Amphidium letestui Thér. & P. de la Varde
- Amphidium mougeotii (Bruch & Schimp.) Schimp.
- Amphidium papillosum E.B. Bartram
- Amphidium remotidens (Müll. Hal.) Broth.
- Amphidium tortuosum (Hornsch.) Cufod.
