= Sibella Annie Barrington =

Canadian nurse

- Born: 4 or 21 December 1867
- Died: 9 or 17 December 1929
- Relatives: Margaret Sibella Brown (cousin)
- Medical career
- Profession: Nurse

Sibella Annie Barrington (4 or 21 December 1867 – 9 or 17 December 1929) was a Canadian nurse.

Born to a family of British settlers in Cape Breton in 1867, Barrington studied at the Aberdeen Hospital School of Nursing in New Glasgow, Nova Scotia. She graduated in 1904 and became a registered nurse in 1922, when the province introduced registration. Barrington continued her studies internationally, first in Chicago, and then in Dublin where she learned of Lady Aberdeen's work in combatting tuberculosis. In London, she worked with the New Zealand physician and child welfare advocate, Frederic Truby King.

She returned to Nova Scotia and by 1917 had a thriving private practice. The British Red Cross Society granted her a lifetime membership for her volunteer work following the 1917 Halifax Explosion. From 1918 to 1923 she served as superintendent of the Halifax Infants' Home. She served as vice-president of the Children's Aid Society, president of the Graduate Nurses' Association of Nova Scotia (and registrar of its successor, the Registered Nurses' Association of Nova Scotia), a councillor for Nova Scotia on the Canadian Nurses' Association, and a delegate to the National Council of Women of Canada.

Following the First World War, the Canadian Red Cross Society sought an increased peacetime role. Barrington moved to Saint John, New Brunswick, where she worked as an organizer of home nursing for the society. Mandated to teach women basic home nursing skills and disease recognition, Barrington made hundreds of home visits and public addresses, and organized dozens of classes. She was also instrumental in establishing Red Cross hospitals in St. Leonard and Clair.

Barrington died in 1929 after surgery at the Saint John General Public Hospital.
