= Scouleriales =

Scientific classification
- Kingdom: Plantae
- Division: Bryophyta
- Class: Bryopsida
- Subclass: Dicranidae
- Order: Scouleriales; Goffinet & W.R. Buck

Families
- Drummondiaceae; Hymenolomataceae; Scouleriaceae

Order of haplolepideous mosses

Scouleriales is an order of haplolepideous mosses in the subclass Dicranidae.

The order contains three families:

- Drummondiaceae
- Hymenolomataceae
- Scouleriaceae
