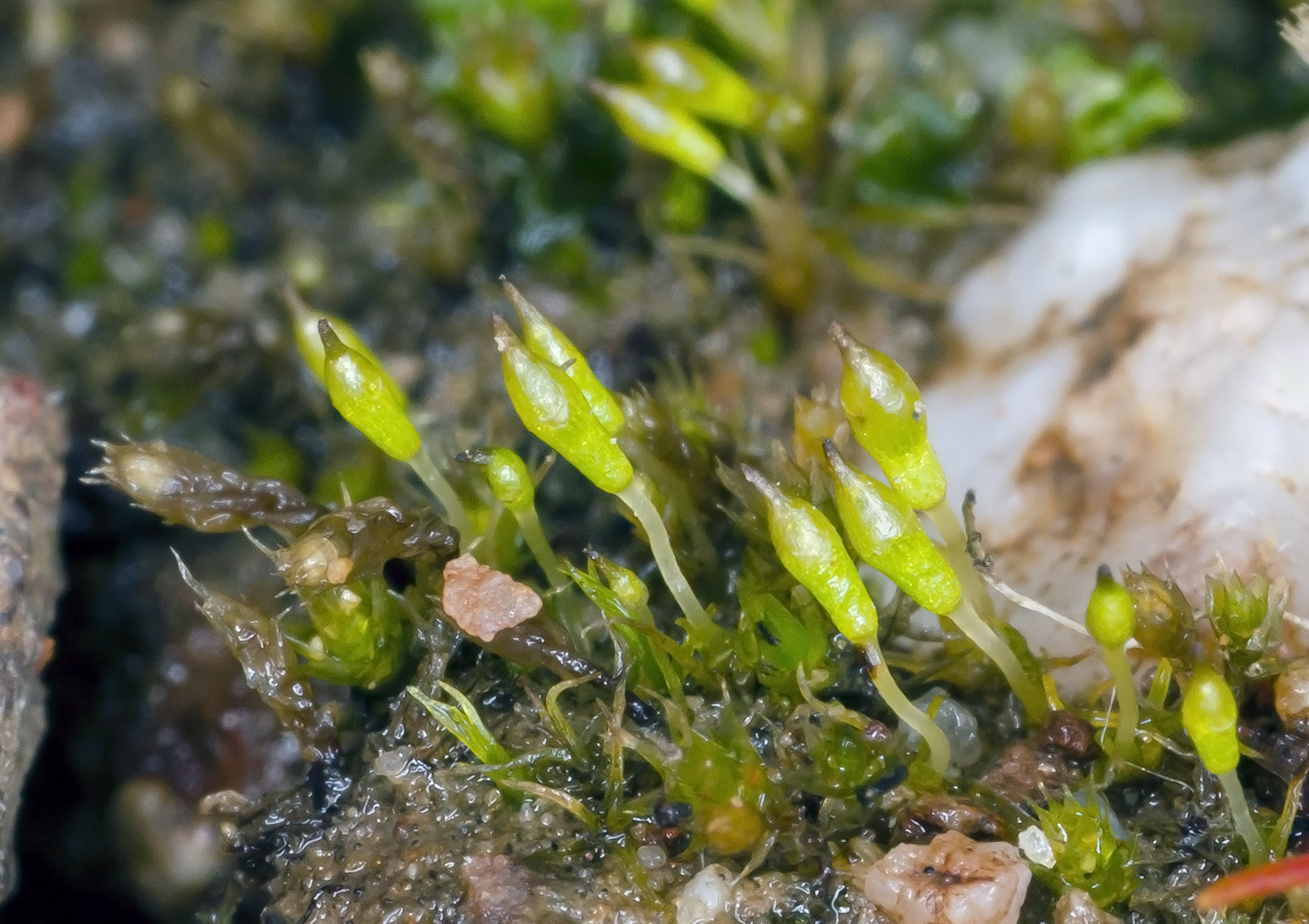
- Bruchia flexuosa

Scientific classification
- Kingdom: Plantae
- Clade: Embryophytes
- Division: Bryophyta
- Class: Bryopsida
- Subclass: Dicranidae
- Order: Bruchiales
- Family: Bruchiaceae; Schimp.

Genera
- Bruchia; Eobruchia; Pringleella; Trematodon

= Bruchiaceae =

Family of haplolepideous mosses

Bruchiaceae is a family of haplolepideous mosses in subclass Dicranidae. The family was previously placed in the order Dicranales, but are now placed in their own monotypic order, Bruchiales.

These mosses have the greatest occurrence in temperate regions. They are mosses with long-necked, cleistocarpous (having the capsule opening irregularly without an operculum) capsules and mitrate calyptras.

== History ==
Viktor Ferdinand Brotherus (in 1909) included Bruchia and Trematodon in the family Dicranaceae, as part of subfamily Trematodontoideae. Nathaniel Lord Britton (in 1913) placed these two genera together with Pringleella in the family Bruchiaceae. Study spore morphology supported the separation of family Bruchiaceae from family Dicranaceae. By 1979, Bruchiaceae had four genera: Bruchia, Pringleella, Eobruchia, and Trematodon.

The current circumscription of the family includes four genera:

- Bruchia Schwäg.
- Eobruchia W.R. Buck
- Pringleella Cardot
- Trematodon Michx

Two genera, Bruchia and Trematodon, with 16 species, are found in the flora of North America. Nine species of the family Bruchiaceae exist in Brazil.
