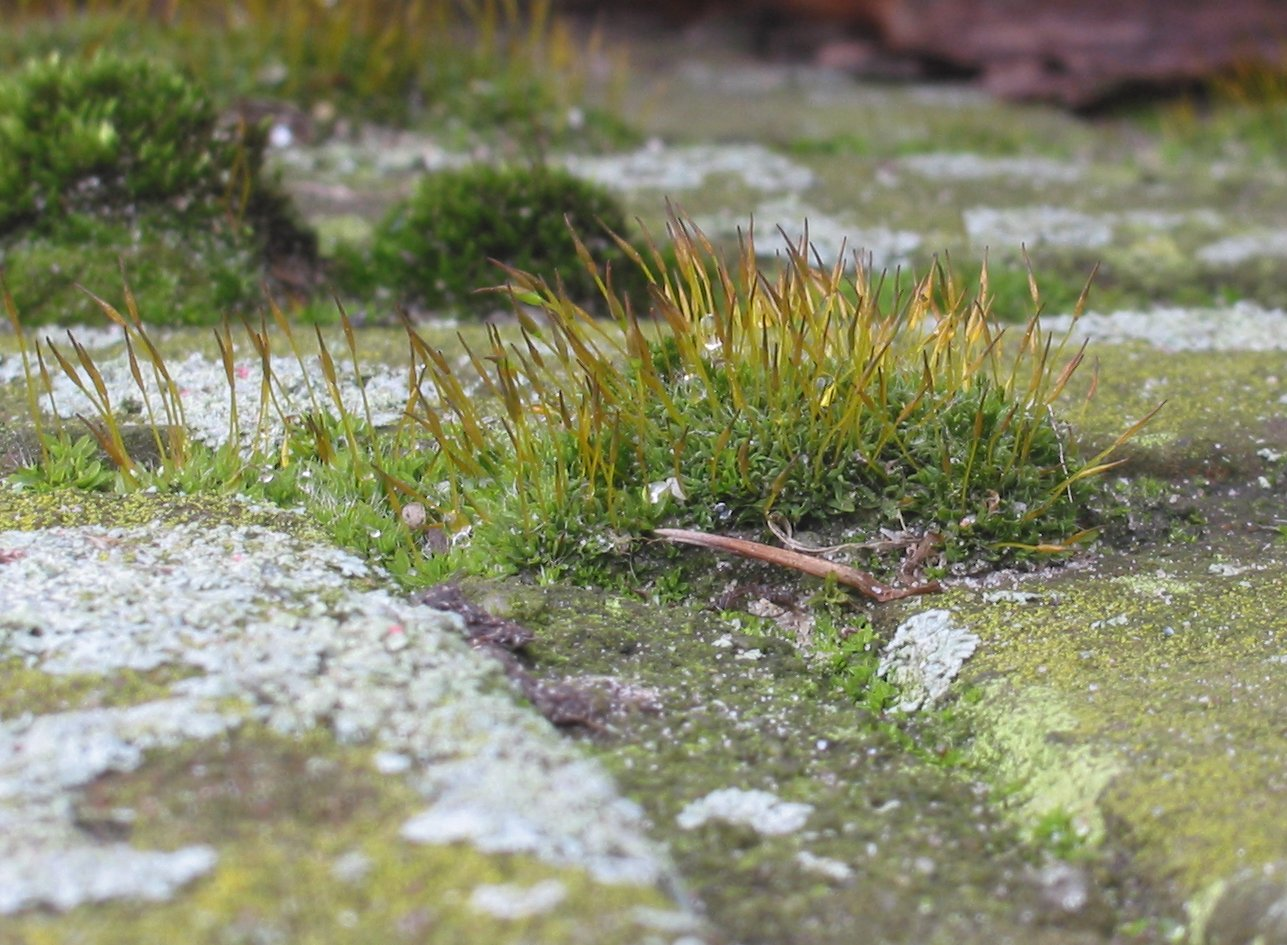
- Tortula muralis

Scientific classification
- Kingdom: Plantae
- Division: Bryophyta
- Class: Bryopsida
- Subclass: Dicranidae
- Order: Pottiales

Families
- Pottiaceae; Pleurophascaceae; Serpotortellaceae; Mitteniaceae

= Pottiales =

Order of mosses

Pottiales is an order of mosses in the subclass Dicranidae.

== Classification ==
The following families are recognised in Bryophyte Biology:

- Pottiaceae Schimp.
- Pleurophascaceae Broth.
- Serpotortellaceae W. D. Reese & R. H. Zander
- Mitteniaceae Broth.

Some other families are recognised by other sources:

- Ephemeraceae Schimp. – this putative family is characterized by highly simplified vegetative and sporogenous bodies and contains two genera, Ephemerum and Micromitrium. However, phylogenetic analysis finds it polyphyletic, with Ephemerum nested in Pottiaceae and Micromitrium recovered among the Dicranales, closely related to the Leucobryaceae, and assigned a new family, Micromitriaceae.
- Hypodontiaceae Stech – family containing the genus Hypodontium. Alternatively placed in Dicranales
- Splachnobryaceae – containing the genera Splachnobryum and Koponobryum
- Bryobartramiaceae – family containing a single genus with one species, Bryobartramia novae-valesiae
- Cinclidotaceae (lattice mosses) – family containing the genus Cinclidotus. Alternately place in Pottiaceae.
