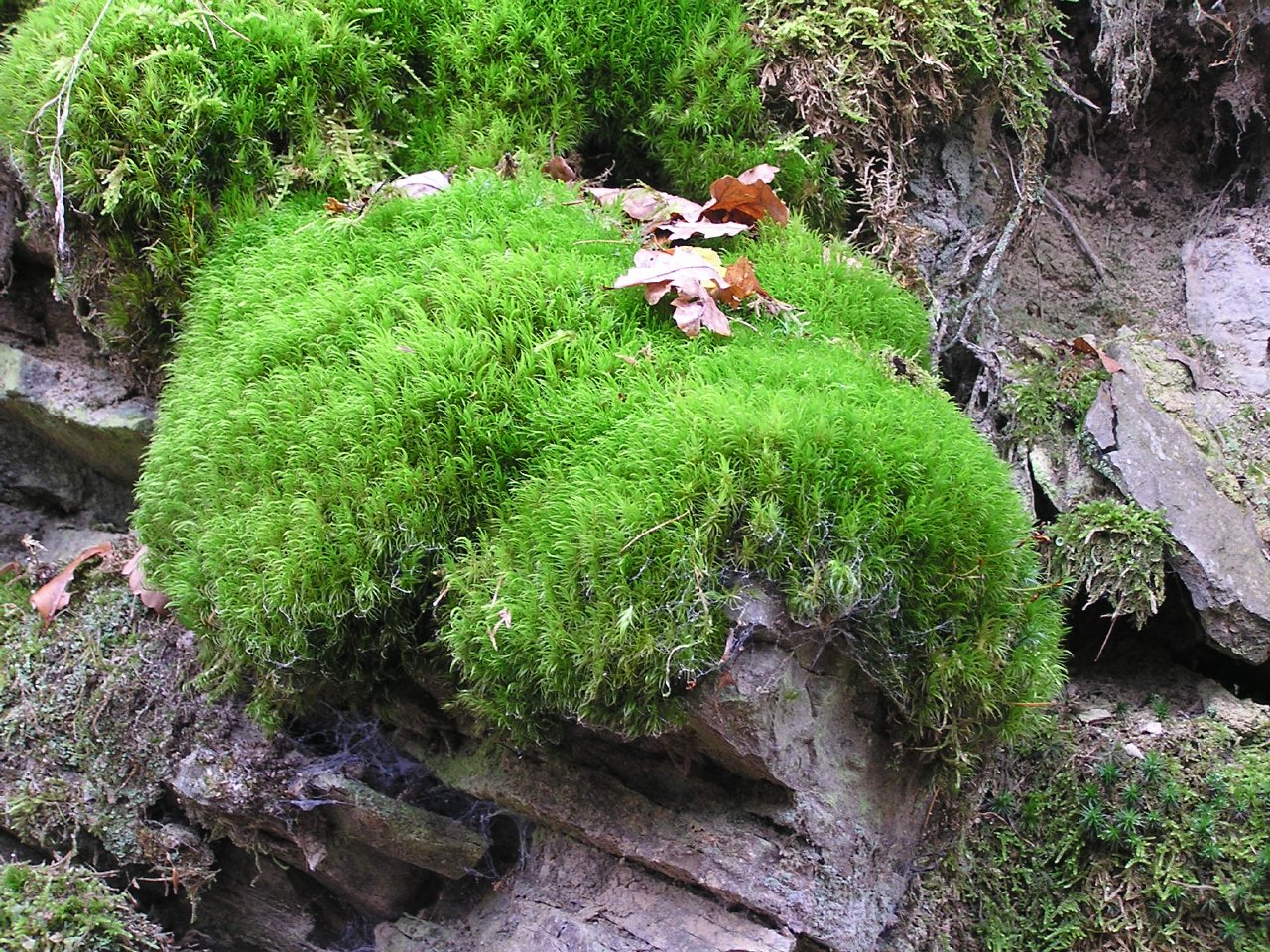
- Dicranum scoparium

Scientific classification
- Kingdom: Plantae
- Division: Bryophyta
- Class: Bryopsida
- Subclass: Dicranidae; Doweld

Orders
- Catoscopiales; Distichiales; Flexitrichales; Scouleriales; Bryoxiphiales; Pseudoditrichales; Grimmiales; Archidiales; Pleurophascales; Mitteniales; Eustichiales; Amphidiales; Dicranales; Rhabdoweisiales; Sorapillales; Ditrichales; Pottiales; Bruchiales; Erpodiales; Orthotrichales

= Dicranidae =

Subclass of mosses

The Dicranidae are a widespread and diverse subclass of mosses in class Bryopsida, with many species of dry or disturbed areas. They are distinguished by their spores; the peristome teeth are haplolepidous with a 4:2:3 formula, and an exostome is absent.

== Systematics ==
Traditionally, the Dricanidae comprised about six to eight orders. However, phylogenetic analysis using molecular markers suggested that Dicranales was paraphyletic with respect to Pottiales.

A recently phylogenomic analysis led to a break-up of Dicranales and creation of a number of new small orders. The phylogenetic relationships recovered within Dicranidae are shown in the cladogram below. The orders Bryoxiphiales, Pseudoditrichales and Mitteniales were not sampled in this study.

- Dicranidae
  - Catoscopiales
  - - Distichiales
    - - - Flexitrichales
        - Scouleriales
      - - Grimmiales
        - - Archidiales
          - - Pleurophascales
            - - Eustichiales
              - - Amphidiales
                - - Dicranales sensu stricto
                  - - Rhabdoweisiales
                    - - Sorapillales
                      - - - Bruchiales
                          - Erpodiales
                        - - Ditrichales
                          - Pottiales
