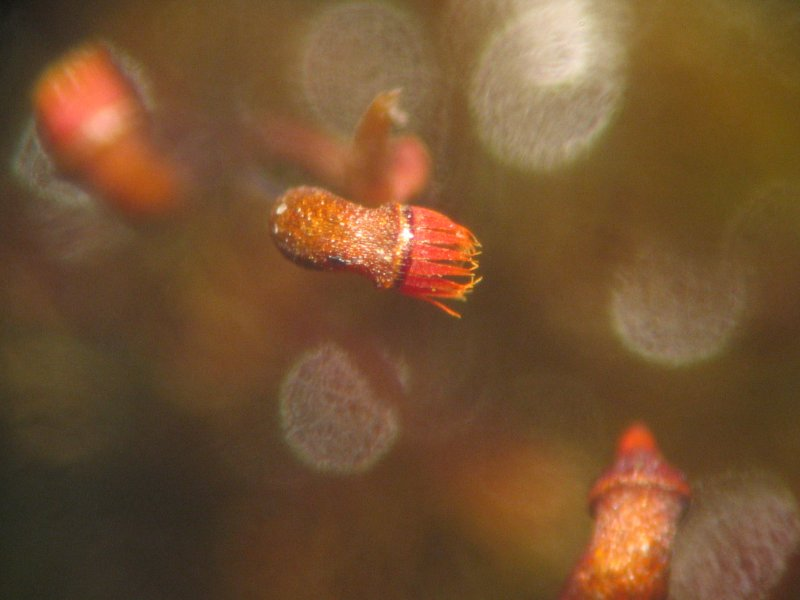
- Arthrodontous capsule of Dicranella varia

Scientific classification
- Kingdom: Plantae
- Division: Bryophyta
- Subdivision: Bryophytina
- Class: Bryopsida (Limpr.) Rothm.

Subclasses
- Buxbaumiidae; Diphysciidae; Gigaspermidae; Timmiidae; Funariidae; Dicranidae; Bryidae

= Bryopsida =

Class of mosses

The Bryopsida constitute the largest class of mosses, containing 95% of all moss species. It consists of approximately 11,500 species, common throughout the whole world.

The group is distinguished by having spore capsules with teeth that are arthrodontous; the teeth are separate from each other and jointed at the base where they attach to the opening of the capsule. Consequently, mosses in the Class Bryopsida are commonly known as the "joint-toothed" or "arthrodontous" mosses. These teeth are exposed when the covering operculum falls off. In other groups of mosses, the capsule is either nematodontous with an attached operculum, or else splits open without operculum or teeth.

== Morphological groups ==
The Bryopsida can be simplified into three groups: the acrocarpous (pinnate), the pleurocarpous (side-fruited), and the cladocarpous (branching) mosses. This is based on the position of the perichaetia and sporophytes.

Acrocarps are generally characterized by an upright growth habit that is unbranched or only sparingly branched. Branching is usually sympodial with the branches similar to main shoot where they originate. Branches below the perichaetium are called subfloral innovations.

Pleurocarps are generally characterized by creeping shoot systems and extensive lateral branching. The main stem is indeterminant and offshooting branches may be dissimilar. The perichaetia in pleurocarps are produced at the tips of extremely reduced, basally swollen lateral branches that are morphologically distinct from the vegetative branches.

Cladocarps are mosses which produce perichaetia at the tips of unspecialized lateral branches. Such branches are themselves capable of branching.

Although acrocarps, pleurocarps, and cladocarps generally have different branching habits, it is the morphology of the perichaetia which defines the groups.

== Capsule structure ==
Among the Bryopsida, the structure of the capsule (sporangium) and its pattern of development is very useful both for classifying and for identifying moss families. Most Bryopsida produce a capsule with a lid (the operculum) which falls off when the spores inside are mature and thus ready to be dispersed. The opening thus revealed is called the stoma (meaning "mouth") and is surrounded by one or two peristomes. A peristome is a ring of triangular "teeth" formed from the remnants of specially thickened cell walls. There are usually 16 such teeth in a single peristome, and in the Bryopsida the teeth are separate from each other and able to both fold in to cover the stoma as well as fold back to open the stoma. This articulation of the teeth is termed arthrodontous.

There are two basic arthrodontous peristome types. The first type is termed haplolepidous and consists of a single circle of 16 peristome teeth. This type of peristome is characteristic of subclass Dicranidae. The second type is the diplolepidous peristome found in subclasses Bryidae, Funariidae, and Timmiidae. In this type, there are two rings of peristome teeth—an inner endostome (short for endoperistome) and an exostome. The endostome is a more delicate membrane, and its teeth are aligned between the teeth of the exostome. There are a few mosses in the Bryopsida that have no peristome in their capsules. These mosses still undergo the same cell division patterns in capsule development, but the teeth do not fully develop.

== Classification ==
In the past, the group Bryopsida included all mosses. Current circumscriptions of the group are more limited.

class Bryopsida

subclass Buxbaumiidae (only Buxbaumia)
subclass Diphysciidae (only Diphyscium)
subclass Gigaspermidae (only Gigaspermaceae)
subclass Funariidae (4 families)
subclass Timmiidae (only Timmia)
subclass Dicranidae (39 families)
subclass Bryidae (71 families)

- - Oedipodiopsida
  - - - Tetraphidopsida
      - Polytrichopsida
      - Bryopsida
        - Buxbaumiidae
        - - Diphysciidae
          - - Gigaspermidae
            - Funariidae
            - Timmiidae
            - Dicranidae
            - - Bryanae (paraphyletic)
              - Hypnanae

The current composition and phylogeny of the Bryopsida.

=== Phylogeny ===
A detailed phylogeny to the level of order, based on the work by Novíkov & Barabaš-Krasni 2015; Cole, Hilger & Goffinet 2021; Fedosov et al. 2016; Ignatov, Fedosov & Fedorova 2016; Bechteler et al. 2023.

- Bryopsida
  - - Buxbaumiidae
      Buxbaumiales
  - - - Diphysciidae
        Diphysciales
    - - - Gigaspermidae
          Gigaspermales
      - - - Funariidae
            - - Disceliales
              - Encalyptales
            - Funariales
        - - - Timmiidae
              Timmiales
          - - Dicranidae
              - Catoscopiales
              - - Distichiales
                - - Scouleriales
                  - - Bryoxiphiales
                    - - Grimmiales
                      - - Archidiales
                        - - Pleurophascales
                          - - Eustichiales
                            - - Amphidiales
                              - - Dicranales
                                - - Rhabdoweisiales
                                  - - Sorapillales
                                    - - - Bruchiales
                                        - Erpodiales
                                      - - Ditrichales
                                        - Pottiales
            - Bryidae
              - Hedwigiales
              - - Splachnales
                - - - Bartramianae
                      Bartramiales
                  - - - Bryanae
                        Bryales
                    - - - Rhizogonianae
                          Rhizogoniales
                      - - Orthotrichales
                        - - Orthodontiales
                          - - Aulacomniales
                            - - Hypnanae
                                - Hypnodendrales
                                - - Calomniales
                                  - - Ptychomniales
                                    - - Hypopterygiales
                                      - - Hookeriales
                                        - Hypnales

Unassigned Dicranidae:

- Pseudoditrichales
