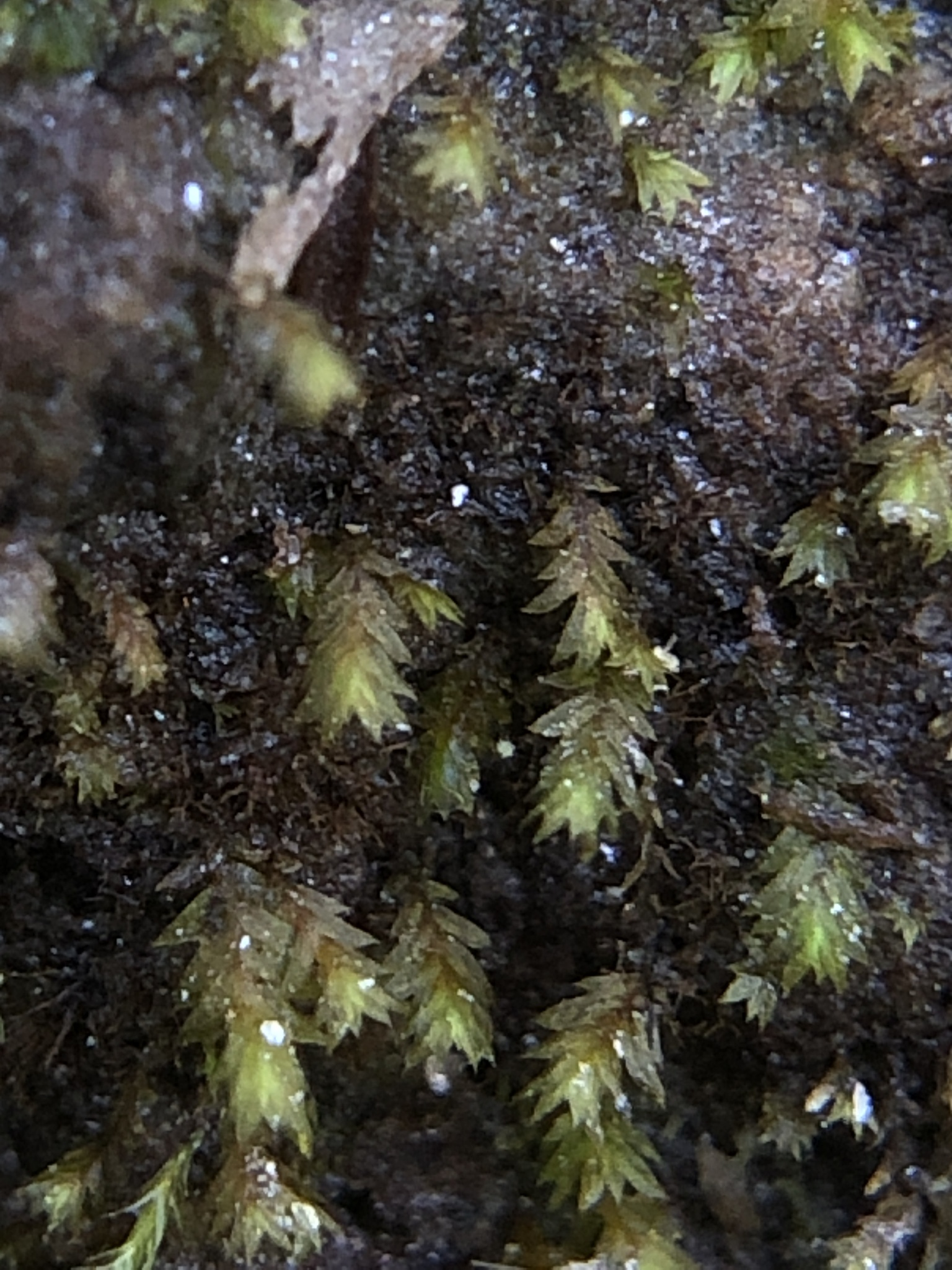

Conservation status
- Least Concern (IUCN 3.1)

Scientific classification
- Kingdom: Plantae
- Division: Bryophyta
- Class: Bryopsida
- Subclass: Dicranidae
- Order: Dicranales
- Family: Fissidentaceae
- Genus: Fissidens
- Species: F. celticus

Binomial name
- Fissidens celticus Paton, 1965

= Fissidens celticus =

Species of moss

Fissidens celticus, also known by its common name Welsh pocket-moss, is a species of moss in the family Fissidentaceae. It was discovered in 1958 in Pembrokeshire by A.H. Norkett and was first described as a new species by Jean Paton in 1965.

== Description ==
Fissidens celticus has shoots up to 4.5 millimetres (0.18 in) tall and 1–1.5 millimetres (0.039–0.059 in) wide. Each shoot has many leaves, often 10 pairs or more, of equal size. The nerve in each leaf runs all the way to the leaf tip and has a distinct bend about halfway along the leaf. Male plants and capsules are not known, and it is uncertain how the species disperses.

Fissidens celticus can be distinguished from F. exilis by its longer shoots, its greater number of leaves and its lack of capsules.

== Habitat ==
Fissidens celticus grows on shaded soil banks near woodland streams, especially on bare, compact patches eroded by floodwater. It has an altitude range of between 5 and 300 metres (16.4 and 984 feet).

== Distribution ==
Fissidens celticus is generally believed to be widespread and common within suitable localities. It is apparently endemic to western Europe and there is no evidence of population decline.

=== Within the United Kingdom ===
The species holotype was from Hustyn Wood, St Breock, Cornwall, and it is common throughout the western parts of the United Kingdom. In the United Kingdom, F. celticus often associates with Calypogeia arguta, Diplophyllum albicans, Dicranella heteromalla, Dicranella rufescens, Epipterygium tozeri, F. bryoides, Pellia epiphylla, Pohlia lutescens, and Pseudotaxiphyllum elegans.

==== England ====
Fissidens celticus is most commonly found in South West England, but is also present in the south east and north west.

There are records of F. celticus from Cornwall, Devon, Gloucestershire, Kent, and Sussex. On the Isle of Wight, it is present in Parkhurst Forest, and at Briddlesford Nature Reserve. As of 2001, the only known record in Lancashire was on the River Lune Biological Heritage Site.

==== Wales ====
The species can be found all across western Wales, including on Anglesey.

==== Scotland ====
Fissidens celticus is present in much of western Scotland. The Tayvallich Juniper and Fen SSSI (near Tayvallich, Argyll and Bute) is noted for its oceanic bryophytes, including F. celticus.

==== Northern Ireland ====
In Northern Ireland, the only known location for F. celticus is in Ness Wood ASSI in County Londonderry.

=== Elsewhere ===
Fissidens celticus has been recorded in many other countries in Europe:

- Germany: in the Leuscheid associating with F. bryoides, Dicranella heteromalla, and Diplophyllum albicans.
- Ireland: one specimen the Slieveardagh Hills, County Tipperary and two in County Cork near Kilworth; associating with F. bryoides and F. taxifolius.
- Spain: in the Aiako Harriak Natural Park associating with F. viridulus.
- Switzerland: in the cantons of Bern, St. Gallen, and Ticino.

In 2019, it was first reported in Turkey (and therefore in Asia). It was found in Bozyazı, Mersin Province, associating with Bartramia stricta, Bryum dichotomum, Didymodon tophaceus, Targionia hypophylla and Timmiella barbuloides.
