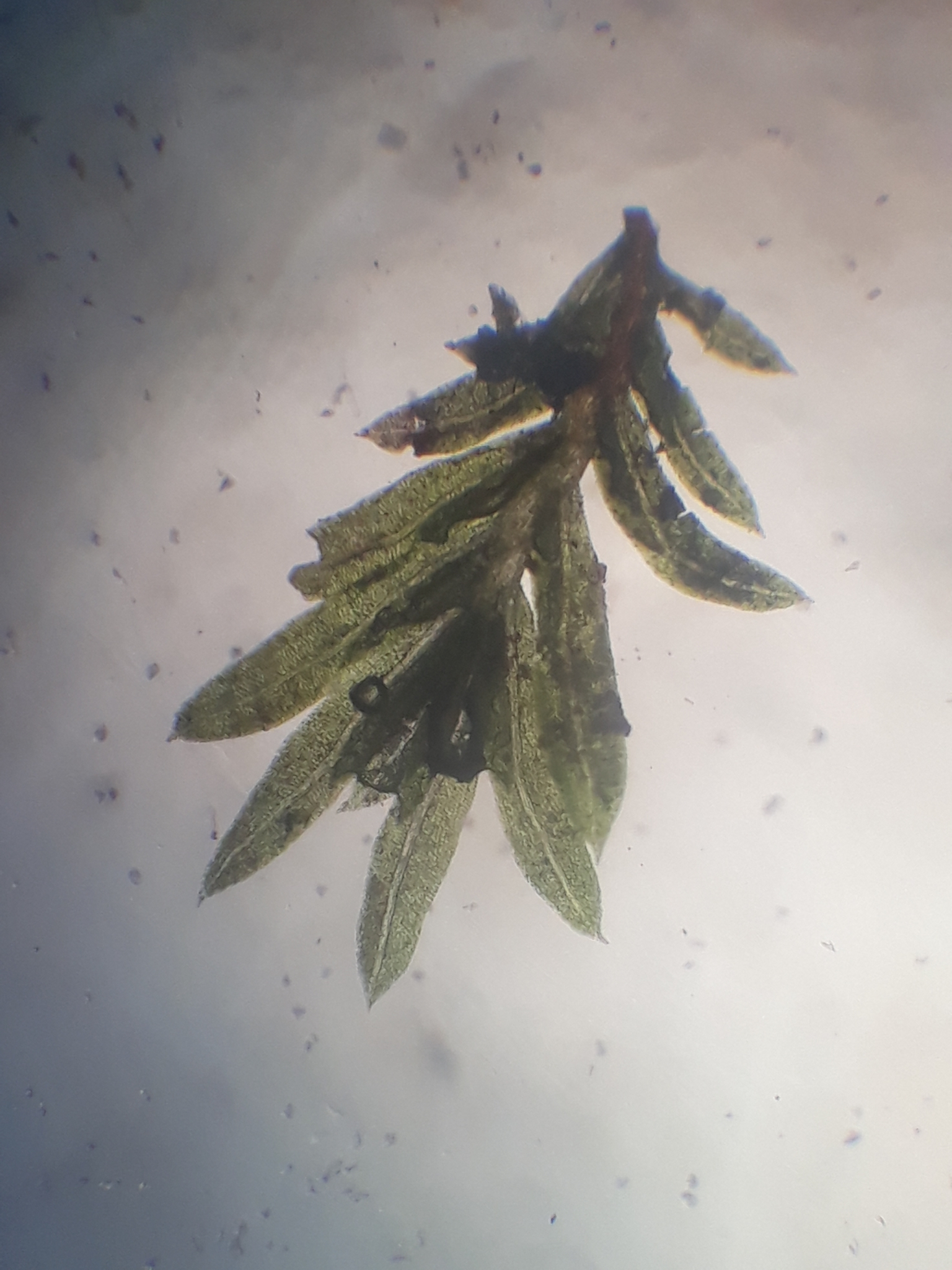

Scientific classification
- Kingdom: Plantae
- Division: Bryophyta
- Class: Bryopsida
- Subclass: Dicranidae
- Order: Dicranales
- Family: Fissidentaceae
- Genus: Fissidens
- Species: F. serratus

Binomial name
- Fissidens serratus C.Müller

= Fissidens serratus =

Species of liverwort

Fissidens serratus is a species of moss belonging to the family Fissidentaceae.

A study in tropical Ecuador found that Fissidens serratus was typically not found in urban environments, suggesting that the species is sensitive to anthropogenic effects such as the presence of wastewater and heavy metal pollution. Contrarily, the closely related Fissidens elegans was frequently found in urban environments but not in more pristine nearby forests.
