= Fissidens fontanus =

Scientific classification
- Kingdom: Plantae
- Clade: Embryophytes
- Division: Bryophyta
- Class: Bryopsida
- Subclass: Dicranidae
- Order: Dicranales
- Family: Fissidentaceae
- Genus: Fissidens
- Species: F. fontanus

Binomial name
- Fissidens fontanus (Bach.Pyl.) Steud.

Synonyms
- Octodiceras fontanum; Octodiceras julianum; Fissidens julianus

Species of moss

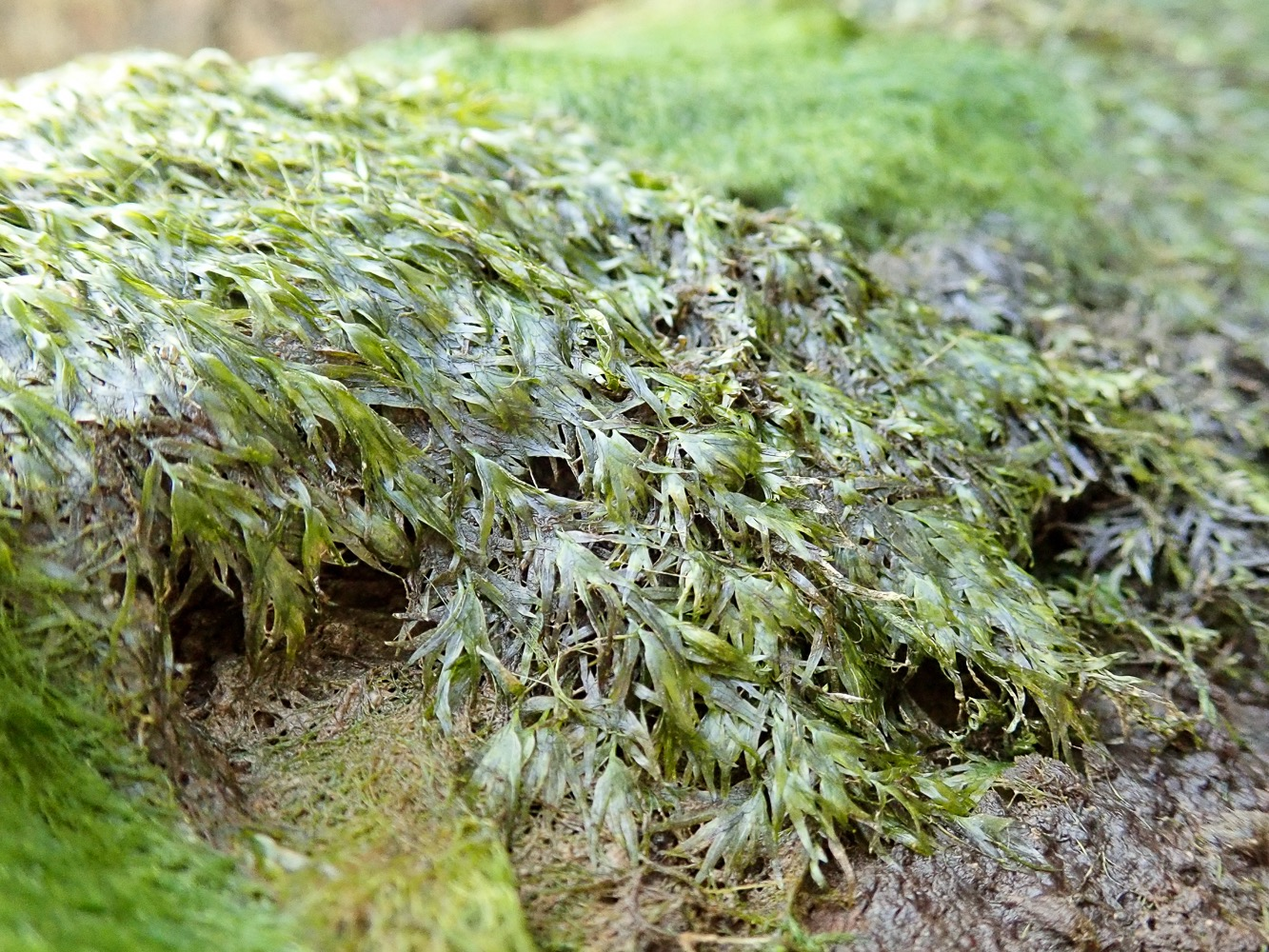
F. fontanus in the environment

Fissidens fontanus, commonly known as limp pocket moss or phoenix moss, is a species of aquatic moss belonging to the family Fissidentaceae.

== Morphology ==
=== Leaf and Growth Morphology ===
Fissidens fontanus is a pleurocarpic moss that has lance-like leaves with a conspicuous midrib that are around 2-7mm in length. At the base of each leaf, a small folded over lobe is formed resembling a pocket. Leaves have an alternating orientation on the stem, ending in a small tuft of gathered leaves. F. fontanus is intolerant to desiccation, quickly drying out of not in water or areas of high humidity. When dried, the leaves curl in and become wavy in appearance This species is simple to identify in the Fissidens genus, as it is the only member to have spaced apart leaves on the stem

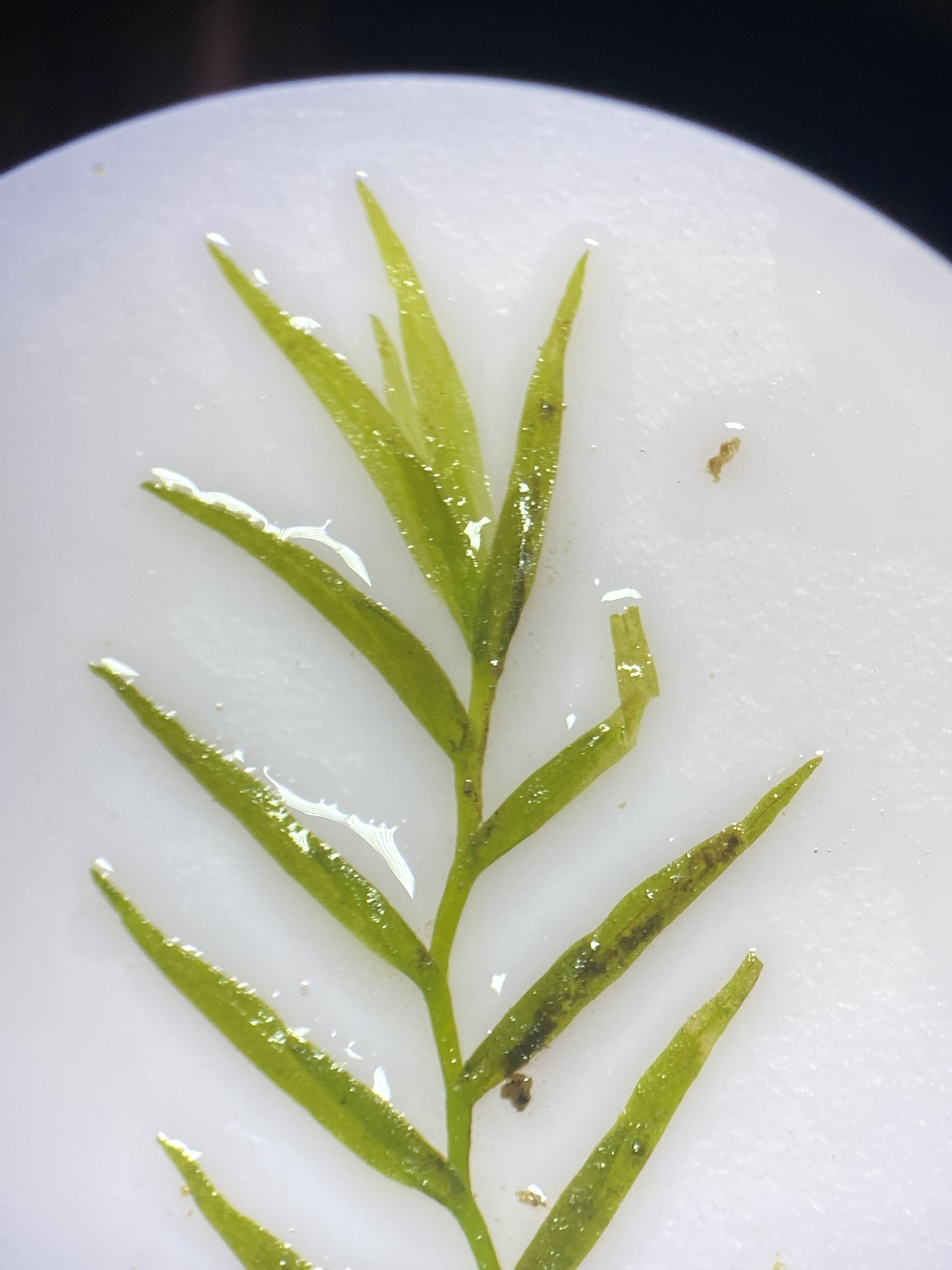
F. fontanus frond under magnification

=== Sporophyte Morphology ===
Sporophytes are located on the stem of F. fontanus, often located in the leaf base. The capsules are short, under around 1mm, and erectly point away from the stem.

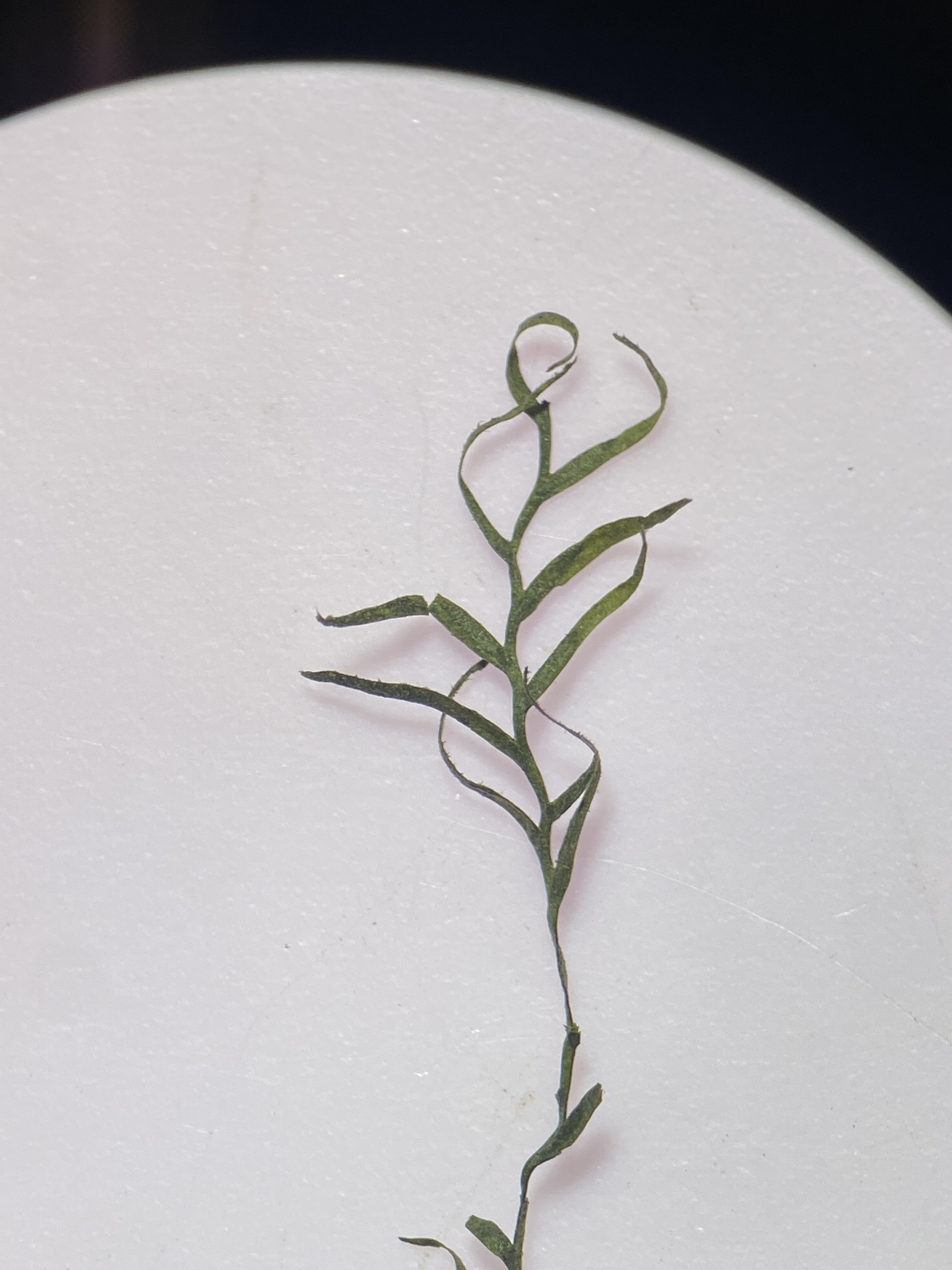
Frond of F. fontanus dried out

== Range ==
Fissidens fontanus has a wide distribution, and has been found across Europe, the Mediterranean, North America, Mexico, Chile, Australia, Zambia, and the Arabian Peninsula.

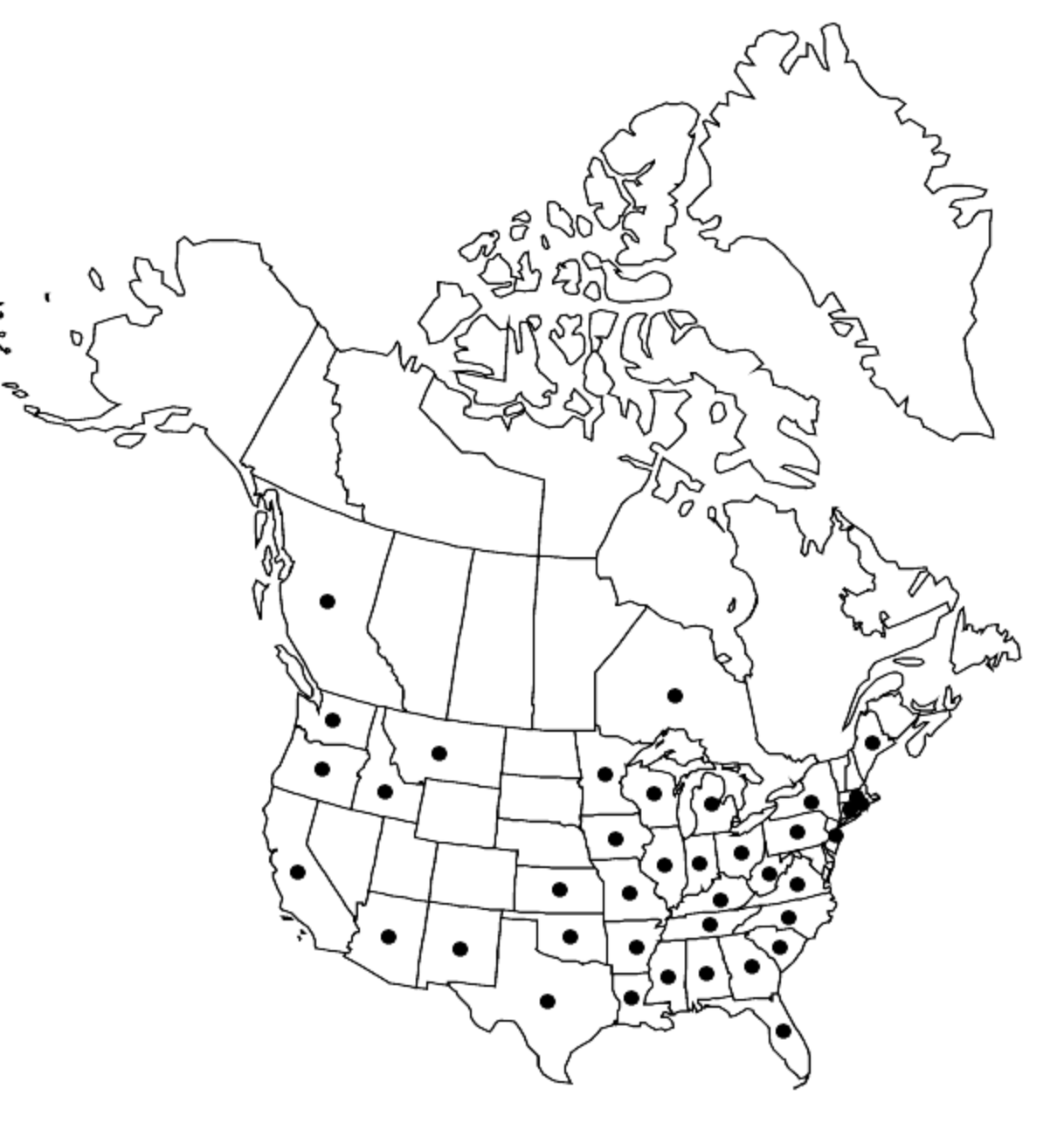
North American distribution map of F. fontanus

Within North America, it is most commonly found in the eastern United States, particularly in the midwest, south, and Northeast. It is not found in New Hampshire, Vermont, Maryland, and Delaware. It is less common in Western United States, being found in states like California, Oregon, Washington, Arizona, New Mexico and Texas.F. fontanus is sparse in Canada, being present in British Columbia and Ontario.

== Habitat ==
F. fontanus forms thick mattes of vegetative material on various material such as flat bedrock, cobbles, roots masses or logs.F. fontanus tolerates water pH of 6.0 to 8.0.F. fontanus is typically found in slow-moving or still water. While this moss is considered to be an aquatic species, it can be found growing emerged in areas where the water levels vary seasonally.F. fontanus can be found in both natural and man-made aquatic environments, and seems to be somewhat tolerant of pollutants.

== Ecology ==
Fissidens fontanus is predated upon by multiple organisms including aquatic mollusks and Trumpeter Swans
