= Fissidens hydropogon =

Conservation status
- Critically Endangered (IUCN 2.3)

Scientific classification
- Kingdom: Plantae
- Division: Bryophyta
- Class: Bryopsida
- Subclass: Dicranidae
- Order: Dicranales
- Family: Fissidentaceae
- Genus: Fissidens
- Species: F. hydropogon

Binomial name
- Fissidens hydropogon Spruce ex Mitt.

Synonyms
- Octodiceras hydropogon (Spruce ex Mitt.) A. Jaeger; Conomitrium hydropogon (Spruce ex Mitt.) Paris

Species of moss

Fissidens hydropogon is a species of moss in the family Fissidentaceae. It is a critically endangered species endemic to Ecuador.

== Taxonomy and history ==
Fissidens hydropogon was first validly described by English bryologist William Mitten in 1869, placing it in Fissidens sect. Octodiceras and attributing it to Richard Spruce, the collector of the holotype. A 1988 revision placed F. hydropogon in Fissidens subgenus Sarawakia alongside F. beccarii and F. acacioides, though this subgenus would later be reduced to section status under Fissidens subgenus Fissidens in 2004.

== Distribution and habitat ==
Fissidens hydropogon was initially only known from one site, submerged in a river in Pastaza Province, Ecuador at 450 m (1,480 ft) above sea level. In 2008 it was discovered growing on the vegetation of Cuphea bombonasae on the periodically flooded shore of the River Nangaritza, 950 m (3,120 ft) above sea level in Zamora-Chinchipe Province, 500 km (310 mi) southwest of the type location.

== Description ==
Fissidens hydropogon is an irregularly branched moss with few rhizoids. The overlapping leaves are lanceolate with bluntly pointed tips, each measuring approximately 2.5 mm (0.098 in) long. Old growth is brown or black with eroded leaves. This species is monoicous, with perichaetia and perigonia arising from the same stems. Sporophytes are limited to one per perichaetium, with very short setae measuring 0.5 mm (0.020 in) or less. The capsules are egg-shaped, measuring 0.5–0.9 mm (0.020–0.035 in) long, with pointed calyptrae that cover only the tip of the capsule. The spores are smooth and measure 22–27 μm (0.022–0.027 mm).

== Conservation status ==
Fissidens hydropogon is listed as critically endangered on the International Union for the Conservation of Nature's Red List under criteria B1 and B2c, based on the small area in which it occurs and the decline of its habitat.
