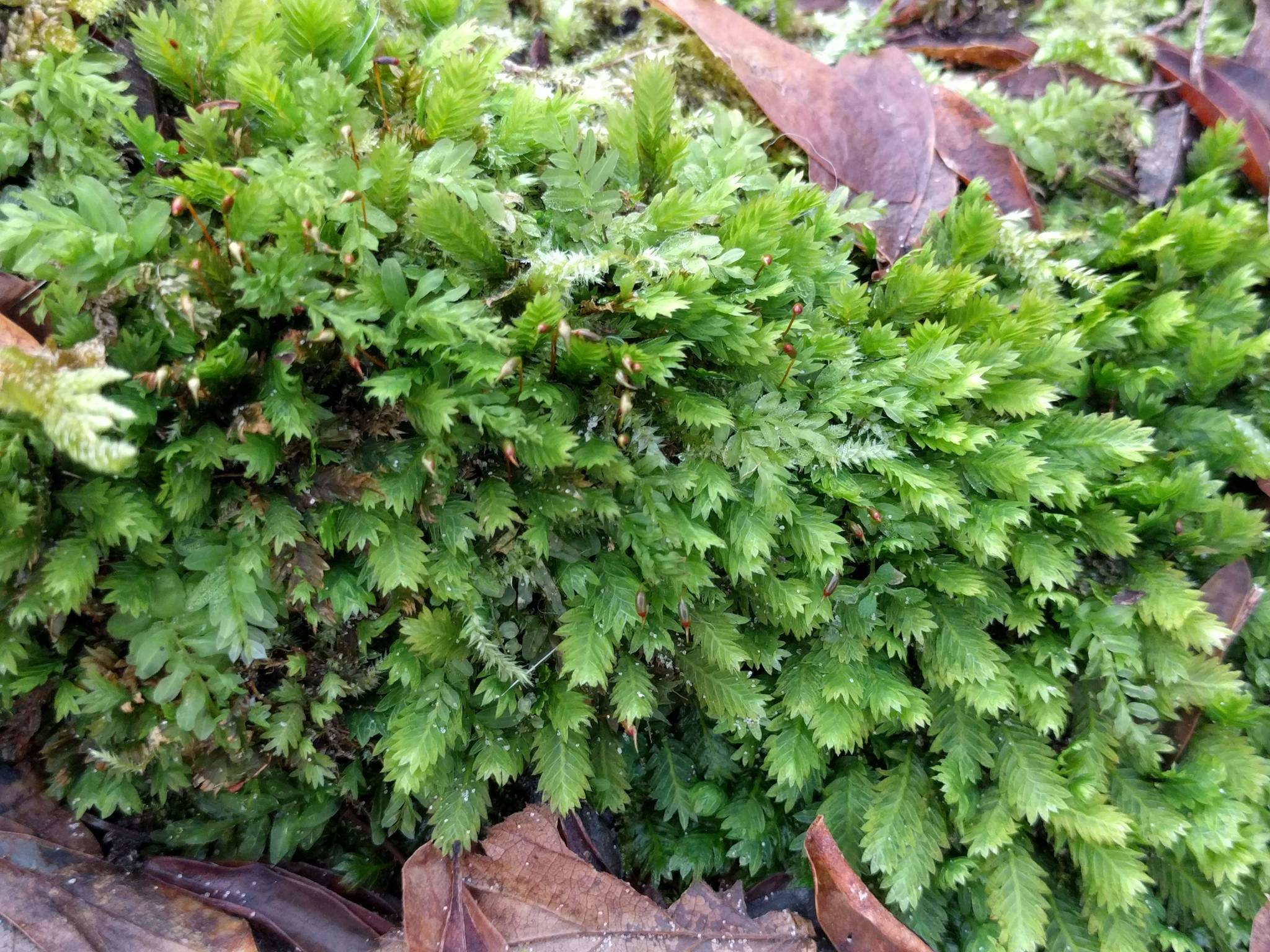

Conservation status
- Least Concern (IUCN 3.1) (Europe regional assessment)

- Secure (NatureServe)

Scientific classification
- Kingdom: Plantae
- Division: Bryophyta
- Class: Bryopsida
- Subclass: Dicranidae
- Order: Dicranales
- Family: Fissidentaceae
- Genus: Fissidens
- Species: F. taxifolius

Binomial name
- Fissidens taxifolius Hedw.

Varieties
- Fissidens taxifolius var. auriculatus (Müll.Hal.) A.E.D.Daniels & P.Daniel; Fissidens taxifolius var. calcuttense (Gangulee) A.E.D.Daniels & P.Daniel; Fissidens taxifolius var. taxifolius; Fissidens taxifolius var. teraicola (Müll.Hal.) A.E.D.Daniels & P.Daniel

Synonyms
- List: Hypnum taxifolium (Hedw.) With.; Dicranum taxifolium (Hedw.) F.Weber & D.Mohr; Skitophyllum taxifolium (Hedw.) Bach.Pyl.; Fissidens bonvaleti Schimp. & Paris; Fissidens pallidicaulis Mitt.; Schistophyllum taxifolium (Hedw.) Lindb.; Fissidens taxifolius var. bonvaletti (Schimp. & Paris) Besch.; Fissidens taxifolius var. langloisii Renauld & Cardot; Fissidens excedens Broth.; Fissidens adelphinus var. submucronatus Cardot; Fissidens taxifolius var. pallidicaulis (Mitt.) Corb.; Fissidens barretoi Dixon & Luisier; Fissidens nipponensis Sakurai; Fissidens taxifolius subsp. pallidicaulis (Mitt.) P.de la Varde; Fissidens okinawaensis E.B.Bartram; Fissidens clebschii Steere; Fissidens pallidulus Hampe ex Gangulee; Fissidens taxifolius f. pallidulus (Hampe ex Gangulee) Nork.; Dicranodon taxifolium (Hedw.) Béhéré; Fissidens pallidicaulis var. major Luisier; Fissidens taxifolius f. mucronatus Limpr.; Fissidens taxifolius var. parvulus R. Ruthe ex Röll; Fissidens taxifolius var. tenuis Bott.

= Fissidens taxifolius =

Species of plant

Fissidens taxifolius, the common pocket moss, is a species of moss in the family Fissidentaceae. First described by Johann Hedwig in 1801, it is a small to medium-sized moss that typically grows in dense, yellowish-green to dark green tufts. The species is characterised by its distinctive flattened appearance, with leaves arranged in two opposite rows resembling tiny fern fronds, and by its pointed leaf tips with projecting central nerves. It can grow in artificial light and is known to form extensive turfs in suitable conditions.

The species has a nearly cosmopolitan distribution, being particularly common in the Northern Hemisphere across Europe, North America, Asia, and Africa, with populations in the Pacific region. While primarily growing on soil and soil-covered rocks in wet, shaded areas, it also occurs in modified environments such as urban parks and gardens. The species shows significant regional variation in both morphology and reproduction. In Europe and North America, populations are typically autoicous, with both male and female organs on the same plant, and readily produce spores, whereas Pacific populations are often dioicous and reproduce primarily through vegetative means. Fissidens taxifolius is assessed as a least-concern species on the IUCN Red List due to its large, stable populations across its range and the lack of major threats to its survival.

== Taxonomy ==
Johann Hedwig formally described Fissidens taxifolius in his 1801 work Species Muscorum Frondosorum. In this protologue, Hedwig provided a simple morphological description of the species, characterising it as having a simple, erect stem that is pinnate-leaved, originating from a basal point that produces both new shoots and fertile structures. He also noted that the peduncles are curved at their tips. The leaves are arranged in two rows, ovate-lanceolate in shape, and the capsule is somewhat nodding and oblong, with a beaked operculum. Hedwig referenced previous descriptions by other bryologists, including Johann Christian Daniel von Schreber (citing Hedwig's earlier works), Carl Linnaeus, Johann Jacob Dillenius, and Sébastien Vaillant, connecting Fissidens taxifolius to several names used previously, such as Hypnum taxifolium and Hypnum laxiforme minus. He stated that the species was widespread across Europe, typically found in moist, shady depressions.

The species name taxifolius refers to the resemblance of its leaves to those of yew trees (genus Taxus). The lectotype specimen, which serves as the definitive reference for the species, is housed in the Hedwig-Schwaegrichen collection at the herbarium in Geneva. The specimen bears Hedwig's handwritten label referencing Linnaeus's Species Plantarum and Dillenius's Historia Muscorum, and forms the basis for its current classification.

Fissidens taxifolius shows notable variation in certain characteristics across its global range. For instance, some morphological features, such as the degree of roughness of the leaf cells and the extent to which the central nerve projects beyond the leaf tip, can vary significantly between populations. In Europe and North America, it is "autoicous" (having both male and female reproductive organs on the same plant). However, in areas such as New Zealand, Hawaii, and Papua New Guinea, it appears to be "dioicous" (having male and female reproductive organs on separate plants).

The species is well-established in taxonomic literature, with over 400 years of documented history. It is considered one of the more distinctive members of the genus Fissidens, though it can be confused with similar species in regions where their ranges overlap. The taxonomic placement of Fissidens taxifolius has remained stable, without major revisions or name changes, making it one of the most stable bryophyte species.

== Description ==
Fissidens taxifolius is a small to medium-sized moss. It typically grows in dense, yellowish-green to dark green tufts. The plant's upright stems grow 5–22 mm tall and up to 4 mm wide, often branching from the base. Like other members of the genus Fissidens, it has a distinctive flattened appearance, with leaves arranged in two opposite rows that resemble a tiny fern frond.

The individual leaves are oblong-lanceolate (spear-shaped) and measure 1.4–2.4 mm in length. A notable characteristic is the leaf tip, which comes to a sharp point (acute) and usually extends into a small projection (mucro or cusp). The leaves have a unique folded structure typical of Fissidens species, with the lower portion forming a sheath that wraps around the stem for half to two-thirds of the leaf length. The species produces smooth rhizoids, unlike some related species like F. osmundoides which has papillose rhizoids (covered with small bumps).

Each leaf has a strong central nerve (costa) that typically extends beyond the leaf tip. The leaf margins are finely toothed (serrulate). The cells making up the leaf surface are small, square to hexagonal in shape, and slightly bulging, giving the leaves a cloudy or opaque appearance. These cells measure about 8–10 micrometres (μm) in length, with some variation.

The species can reproduce both sexually and asexually. For asexual reproduction, it sometimes produces small structures called rhizoidal tubers, which measure 150–380 μm in diameter. Old shoots often show evidence of animal grazing, with eroded leaf surfaces. In its New Zealand populations, only female plants have been found. No male organs or spore capsules have been observed, suggesting the vegetative reproduction. Archegonia are about 300 μm long, and the antheridia 120 μm long.

When dry, the leaves remain relatively straight or become slightly twisted in their upper portions, rather than curling dramatically as some mosses do. The species can be distinguished from similar Fissidens species by its tufted growth habit and the distinctive pointed leaf tips with their projecting central nerve.

There is distinct variation in morphological features across the species' global range. For example, the roughness of leaf cells and the extent to which the central nerve projects beyond the leaf tip can vary significantly between populations. European and North American specimens typically have bumpy (mammillose) leaf cells, while some Pacific populations show less pronounced cell surface features.

Microscopic features
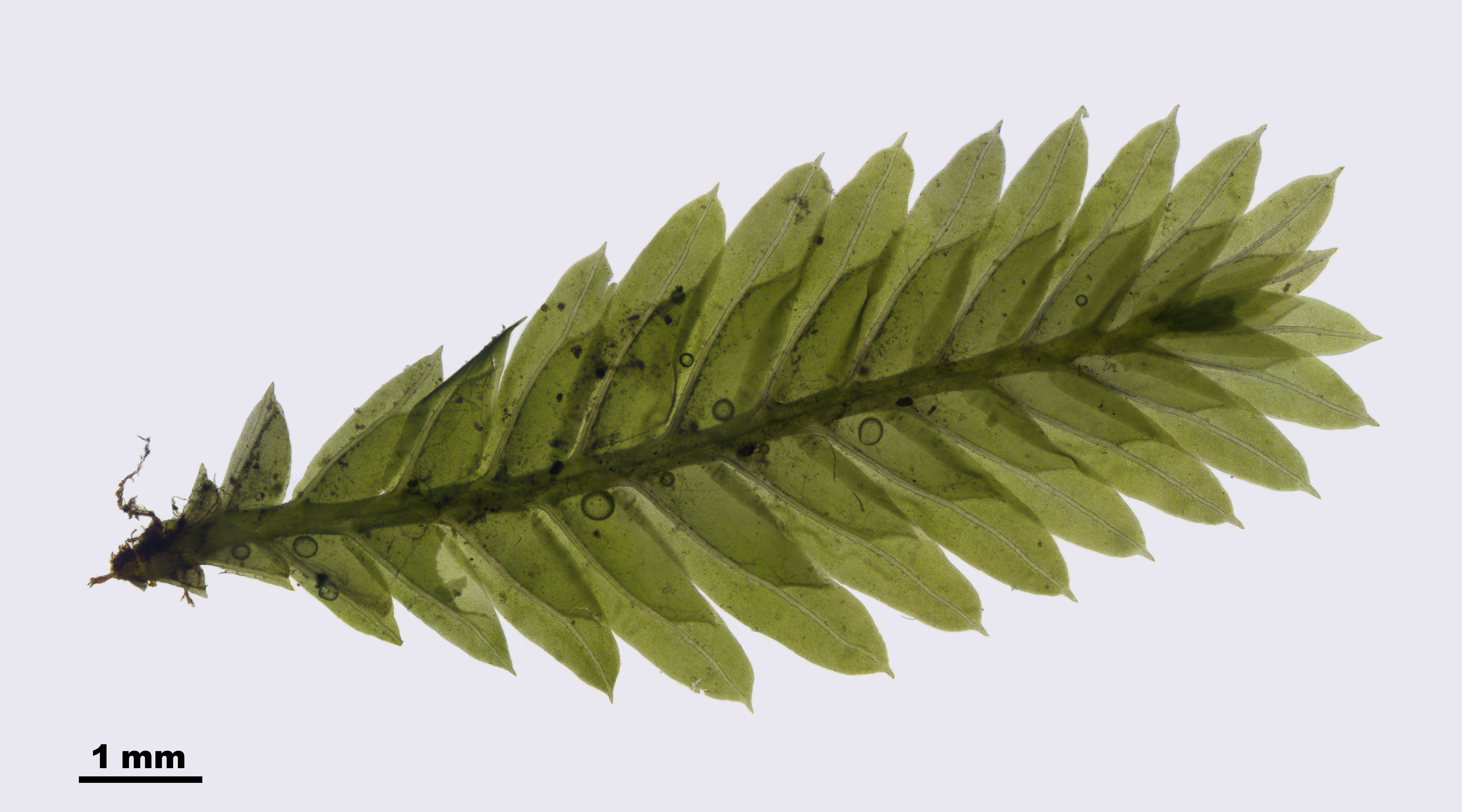
Typical frond-like appearance showing the characteristic two-ranked leaf arrangement and pointed leaf tips.
Scale bar: 1 mm

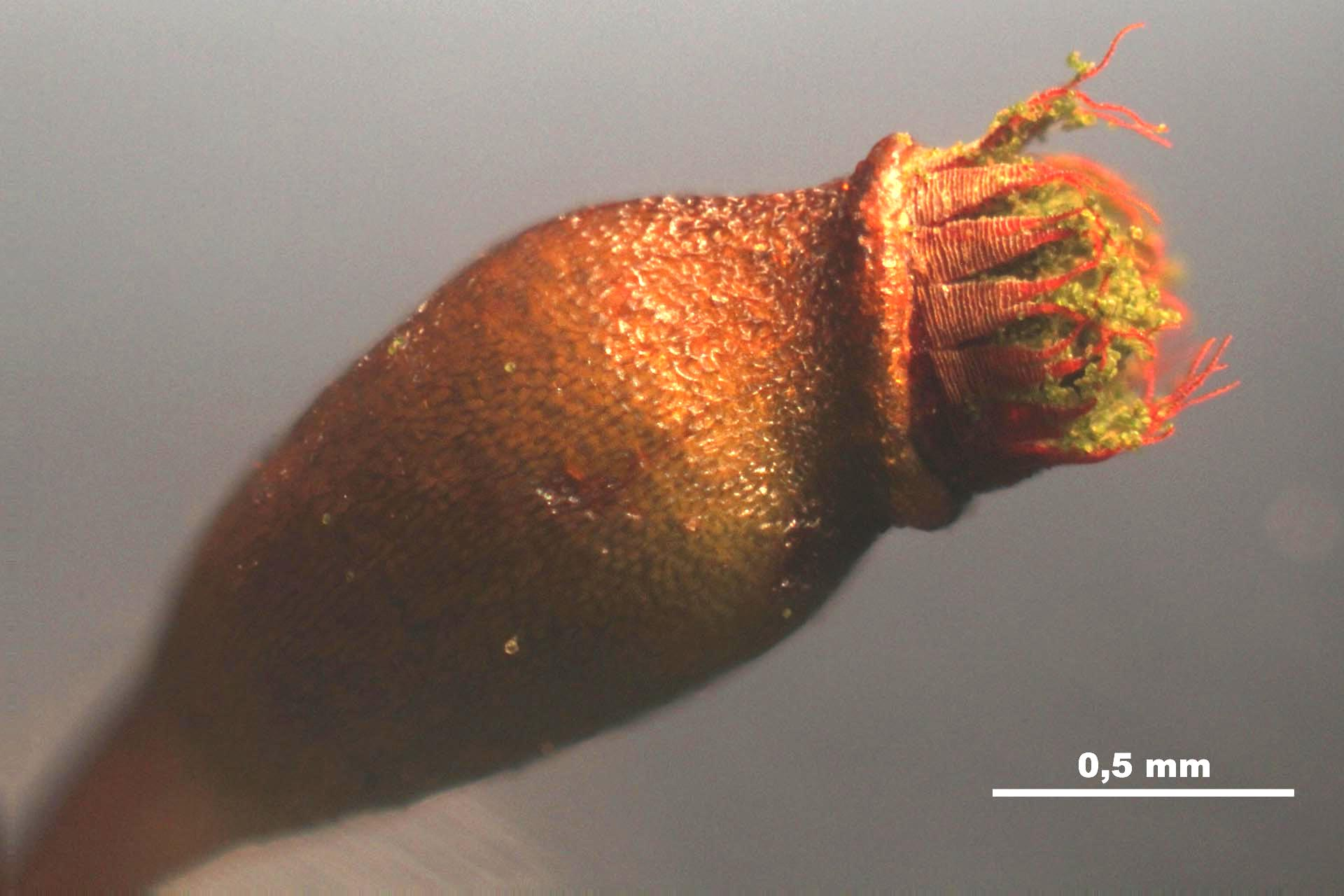
Spore capsule (sporangium) showing the reddish-brown colouration and characteristic opening.
Scale bar: 0.5 mm

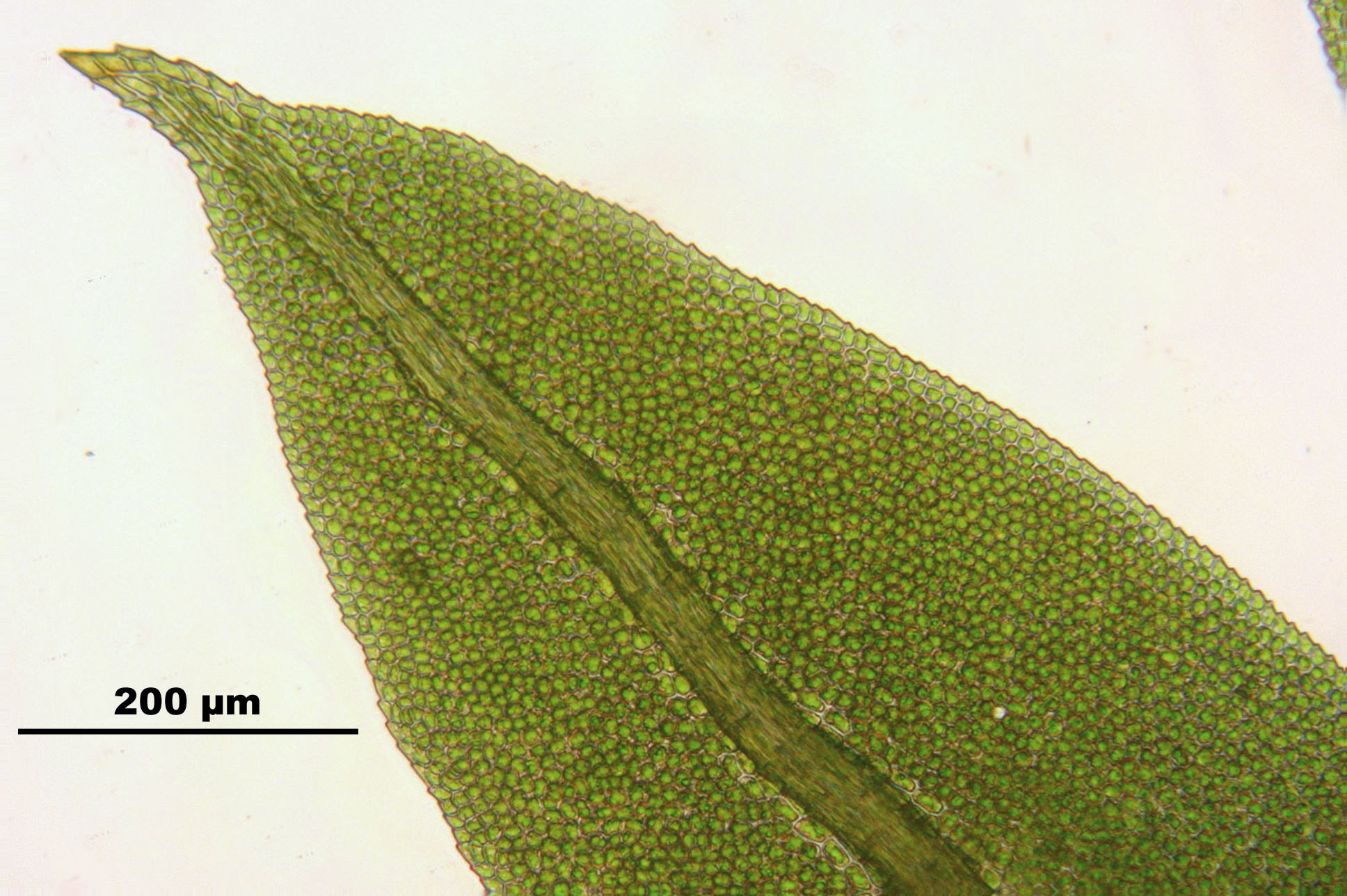
Microscopic view of a single leaf showing the characteristic central nerve (costa) and small, hexagonal cells of the leaf surface.
Scale bar: 200 μm.

=== Variability ===
Fissidens taxifolius var. pallidicaulis is a type found in the Southern-Temperate Oceanic region. It differs from the typical form primarily by its taller shoots, reaching up to 3 cm in height (and even up to 6 cm in Madeira). The leaves are usually lance-shaped to narrow lance-shaped, tapering to a pointed tip from the end of the sheathing base. Additionally, the leaf cells are 7–9 μm wide in the central part of the upper leaf. However, this variety is considered of doubtful taxonomic value.

== Reproduction ==
The species exhibits different reproductive patterns across its range. In Europe and North America, it is autoicous, meaning both male and female reproductive organs are found on the same plant. However, in other regions including New Zealand, Hawaii, and Papua New Guinea, populations appear to be dioicous, with male and female reproductive organs on separate plants. In some Pacific regions, only female plants have been found, and the species appears to reproduce primarily through vegetative means rather than spore production.

== Similar species ==
Fissidens taxifolius can be confused with several similar species where their ranges overlap. An example is Fissidens nothotaxifolius, which closely resembles F. taxifolius but can be distinguished by its pluripapillose cells (cells with multiple small protrusions), particularly prominent on the vaginant laminae (the sheathing portion of the leaf). These papillae require careful microscopic examination to observe and are best seen in cross-section. Another distinguishing feature of F. nothotaxifolius is its conspicuously whitened costae (central nerves) contrasting with very dark green leaves, and its leaves tend to be more undulate (wavy) than those of F. taxifolius.

Two other species that may be confused with F. taxifolius due to their similar size and unbordered leaves are Fissidens asplenioides and F. oblongifolius. However, F. taxifolius is readily distinguished from both by its characteristic tufted growth habit and its mucronate to cuspidate leaf apices (tips that end in a sharp point) containing a percurrent or excurrent nerve (a central nerve that reaches or extends beyond the leaf tip).

Some forms of Fissidens pacificus can also resemble F. taxifolius, particularly when certain diagnostic features are poorly expressed. The key difference lies in the cell size, with F. pacificus having larger laminal cells (9–13 μm) compared to those of F. taxifolius (7–9 μm). F. pacificus can also be identified by the presence of a paler marginal band of cells.

Another lookalike, F. bushii can be distinguished by its dark-green colour, irregularly bistratose leaf laminae (having two cell layers), broadly acute to rounded obtuse leaf apices, and slender costae that usually end in the apiculi. The most reliable way to separate the two species is by examining the vaginant lamina cells in cross-section: in F. bushii the cells are pluripapillose (having multiple small protrusions), while in F. taxifolius they are mammillose (having larger, rounded protrusions).

== Habitat, distribution, and ecology ==
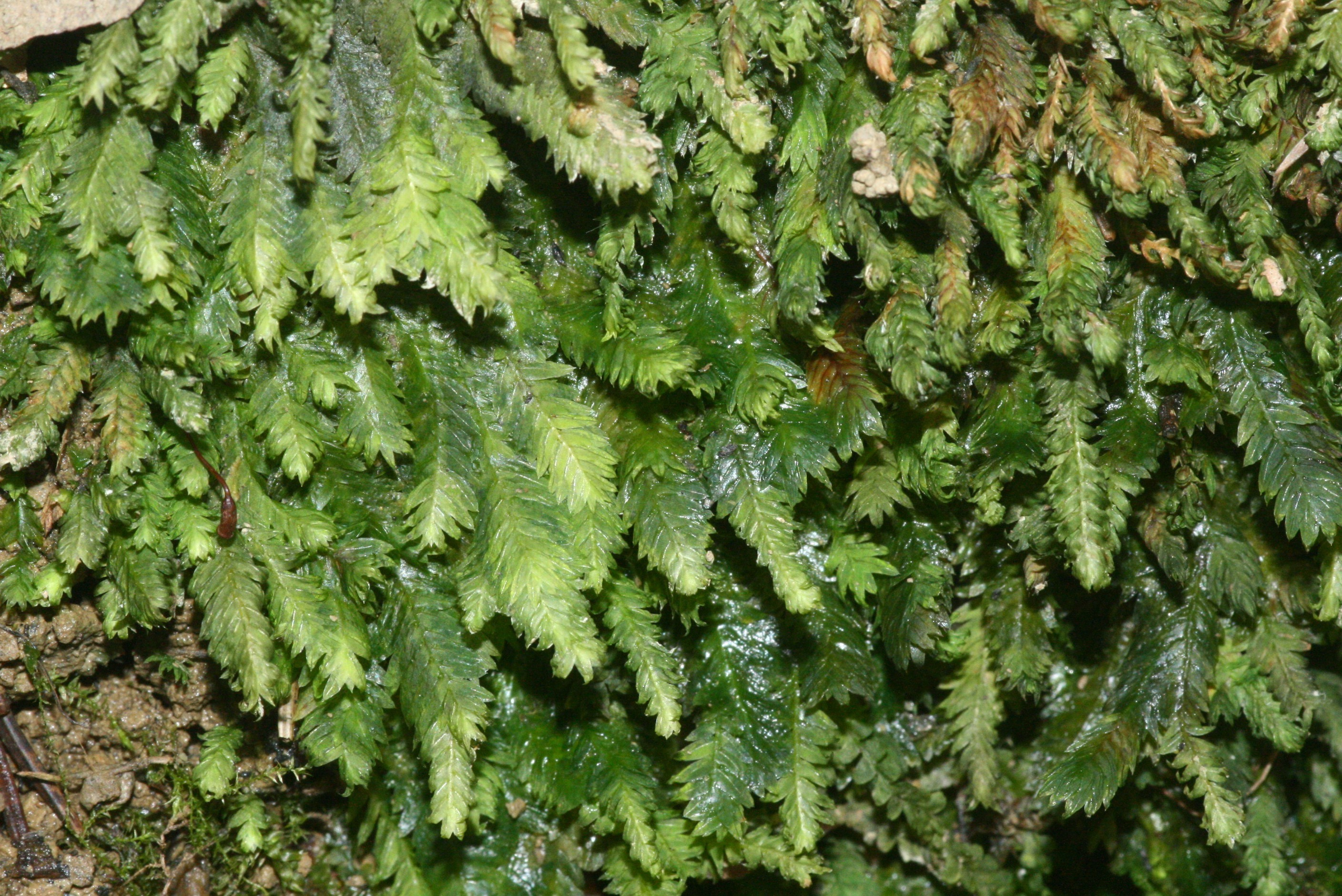
Dense turf of F. taxifolius showing its typical growth habit in a shaded, moist habitat. The fern-like arrangement of leaves is clearly visible.

Fissidens taxifolius has an incompletely cosmopolitan distribution, being particularly common in the Northern Hemisphere. The species has been documented across Europe, North and South America, Asia, Africa, and the Pacific region. It is absent from Antarctica, very rare in sub-Saharan Africa, and not known from Australia. The species is rare or absent in boreal and arctic regions. It has an exceptionally wide presence, occurring in Algeria, Armenia, Austria, Bermuda, Brazil, Burma, Canada, Chad, Cuba, Denmark, Dominican Republic, Egypt, France, Germany, Guatemala, Haiti Islands, Honduras, Ireland, Japan, Mexico, Netherlands, New Zealand, Norway, Papua New Guinea, Poland, Portugal, Russia, Spain, Sweden, Switzerland, Taiwan, Thailand, Turkey, United Kingdom, and United States of America.

Fissidens taxifolius is known to be able to use artificial light to grow in places which are otherwise devoid of natural light, such as Crystal Cave in Wisconsin.

=== Habitat and ecology ===
The species typically grows on bare earth in lightly shaded conditions, forming extensive turfs that can cover several square metres when conditions are favourable. It is particularly characteristic of woodland and forest on base-rich and neutral soils, and commonly occurs in stream valleys and rocky slopes. It occurs in both modified and natural environments, including urban parks, gardens, suburban lawns, roadside areas, forest tracks, and shaded banks. While primarily growing on soil and soil-covered rocks in wet, shaded areas, it occasionally grows epiphytically on tree bark.

Fissidens taxifolius commonly grows alongside other moss species, particularly Fissidens pungens, Fissidens leptocladus, and Stokesiella praelonga. The species shows adaptations for survival and spread, including vegetative reproduction through plant fragments and specialised underground rhizoidal tubers. Evidence of animal grazing on the leaves suggests it forms part of the diet of small invertebrates.

=== Regional distribution patterns ===
In North America, the species is widespread in eastern regions from Nova Scotia, Quebec, and Ontario, south to Florida, west to Texas, Oklahoma, Kansas and Nebraska, with disjunct populations in Arizona, Washington to California, and the Northwest Territories.

In the Pacific region, elevation ranges vary significantly. Hawaiian populations occur primarily at high elevations within 300 metres of the timber line, growing on loose, protected soil banks. In Papua New Guinea, it has been found in 28 localities between 1,400 and 2,900 metres elevation, primarily in forests.

In New Zealand, F. taxifolius exists as an introduced species, occurring from sea level to 325 metres elevation. The species shows a clear preference for warmer regions, predominantly appearing in areas with mean annual temperatures above 12.5°C, particularly in the northern regions of the North Island, with scattered populations extending south to Nelson. Several factors support its classification as an introduced species: the moss is found almost exclusively in disturbed habitats and modified environments, only female plants have been documented (with reproduction occurring solely through vegetative means), and despite extensive botanical surveys, no specimens were collected prior to 1966. Additionally, its distribution appears to be constrained by temperature requirements, further suggesting its non-native status.

Regional populations show distinct reproductive patterns: while the species produces spore capsules readily in Europe and North America, Pacific populations (including New Zealand, Hawaii, and Papua New Guinea) reproduce primarily through vegetative means, suggesting either environmental limitations or single-gender populations.

== Conservation ==
Fissidens taxifolius is assessed as a least-concern species (LC) on the IUCN Red List. The species maintains large, stable populations across its range and faces no major threats to its survival. While it occurs naturally in various woodland and forest habitats, it has also successfully adapted to human-modified environments including urban parks and cultivated land. The species is present in multiple protected areas and requires no specific conservation measures. Its absence from Australia and rarity in sub-Saharan Africa appear to reflect natural distribution patterns rather than conservation concerns.
