= Fissidens usambaricus =

Scientific classification
- Kingdom: Plantae
- Division: Bryophyta
- Class: Bryopsida
- Subclass: Dicranidae
- Order: Dicranales
- Family: Fissidentaceae
- Genus: Fissidens
- Species: F. usambaricus

Binomial name
- Fissidens usambaricus Broth.

Synonyms
- Fissidens chevalieri Corb.; Fissidens usambaricus var. acutifolius P.de la Varde

Species of moss

Fissidens usambaricus is a species of moss belonging to the family Fissidentaceae. It is known from Sub-Saharan Africa, where it is found in a variety of forest types. In Angola, it has been reported to grow in lowland rainforests.

== Taxonomy ==
The species was formally described by the bryologist Viktor Ferdinand Brotherus in 1891. The species was first described from a specimen collected by Wilhelm Holst (no. 3472) in Lutindi, Usambara Mountains, Tanzania, where it was found growing sparsely on forest floor soil. The lectotype specimen is housed at the University of Helsinki Herbarium (H), and was designated as such by Robert E. Magill in his 1981 treatment of South African mosses, though it had previously been annotated as a holotype.

== Description ==
Fissidens usambaricus is a small moss species, typically growing to heights of 1.5 to 5 millimetres (mm), with a spread of 1.5 to 2.5 mm. The stems are typically unbranched and bear their leaves in a pinnate arrangement. The leaves lack a border (technically termed 'elimbate') and are shaped like an elongated oval or reverse teardrop, with a broadly pointed to rounded tip that sometimes has a tiny projection. Individual leaves measure 1.0 to 1.5 mm in length and 0.33 to 0.6 mm in width.

A distinctive feature of this species is the absence of a central nerve (costa) in most leaves, though some reproductive leaves may show a very faint nerve extending just a few cells. The leaves are divided into different sections, with the clasping portion (vaginant laminae) extending about halfway up the leaf length. The leaves show little change when dry, unlike many other mosses that become twisted or curled.

The cells that make up the leaves are remarkably large for a moss, measuring 42–75 by 15–36 micrometres (μm), with smaller cells (12–30 by 7.5–10.5 μm) around the edges. These cells are smooth and either flat or slightly bulging. The variation in cell size is notable within this species, with some specimens showing significantly smaller cells than others.

The reproductive structures of F. usambaricus can be male (perigonia), female (perichaetia), or both (synoecia), and are found at the tips of the stems. The male structures (perigonia) are quite small, measuring 0.5–2.3 mm long, while the female and mixed structures are typically 3–5 mm tall. When present, the spore capsules are borne on stalks (setae) 2.5–3 mm long, with up to three capsules emerging from each female structure. The capsules themselves are small (0.65 by 0.45 mm) and stand either upright or slightly tilted. Each capsule is topped by a lid (operculum) measuring 0.5–0.55 mm in length and contains spores 9–12 μm in size. The spores can range from smooth to showing slight surface bumps (indistinctly papillose).

This species can be distinguished from similar mosses like Fissidens metzgeria and F. enervis by its lack of a leaf border, whereas these related species have clearly bordered leaves despite sharing the absence of a central nerve and large cell size.

== Habitat and distribution ==
Fissidens usambaricus is endemic to Africa, where it shows a distinct preference for soil-based habitats, though it can occasionally be found growing on wooden debris, rock surfaces, or termite mounds. The species is typically found on shady banks and road cuts, though it can also occur near waterfalls and on rocks in or along streams. The species grows at elevations ranging from 25 to 2,400 metres above sea level. It grows in various forest types, including dry semi-deciduous forests, mesic montane forests, rainforest (lowland, submontane and montane), Afromontane forest, woodbush, and even Pinus plantations.

In Uganda, the moss has been documented across several districts, including Kabale, Kabarole, Masindi, Rukungiri, and on Damba Island in Mukono District. Beyond Uganda, its range extends throughout various regions of sub-Saharan Africa, with confirmed populations in East African nations (Kenya, Tanzania, and Rwanda), Central Africa (Democratic Republic of the Congo and the Central African Republic), West Africa (Nigeria and Cameroon), and southern Africa (South Africa and Eswatini, formerly Swaziland). The species has also been recorded in the Cape Verde archipelago off the west coast of Africa. It typically grows scattered among other mosses, though it occasionally forms loose or dense mats.
