= Fissidens microstictus =

Conservation status
- Extinct (1992) (IUCN 3.1)

Scientific classification
- Kingdom: Plantae
- Division: Bryophyta
- Class: Bryopsida
- Subclass: Dicranidae
- Order: Dicranales
- Family: Fissidentaceae
- Genus: Fissidens
- Species: †F. microstictus

Binomial name
- †Fissidens microstictus Dixon & Luisier

Species of moss

Fissidens microstictus is an extinct species of moss in the family Fissidentaceae. It was endemic to Madeira, Portugal. Last seen in 1982, it was assessed as extinct in 1992 due to the destruction of its natural habitat.

== Distribution and habitat ==
Known only from the island of Madeira, Fissidens microstictus grew on basaltic rocks and was most common at altitudes of 78–313 m (256–1,027 ft) above sea level. It was recorded from just three sites in the parish of Monte, near Funchal. This area is now fully urbanised due to increased tourism.
