= Fissidens arnoldii =

Scientific classification
- Kingdom: Plantae
- Division: Bryophyta
- Class: Bryopsida
- Subclass: Dicranidae
- Order: Dicranales
- Family: Fissidentaceae
- Genus: Fissidens
- Species: F. arnoldii

Binomial name
- Fissidens arnoldii Ruthe

Species of moss

Fissidens arnoldii is a species of moss belonging to the family Fissidentaceae.

It is native to Southern Europe.
