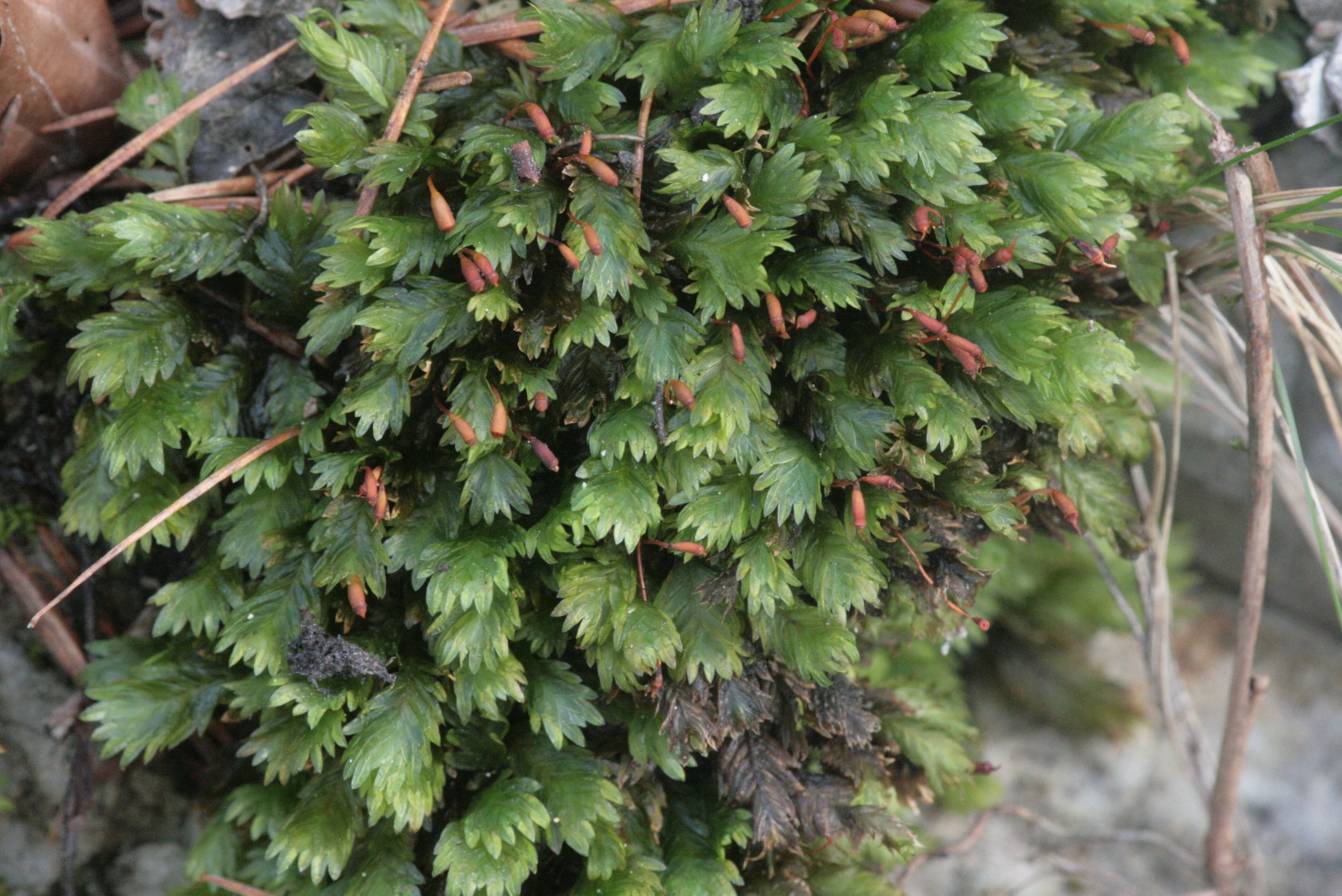

Conservation status
- Least Concern (IUCN 3.1)

Scientific classification
- Kingdom: Plantae
- Division: Bryophyta
- Class: Bryopsida
- Subclass: Dicranidae
- Order: Dicranales
- Family: Fissidentaceae
- Genus: Fissidens
- Species: F. dubius

Binomial name
- Fissidens dubius P.Beauv.

Synonyms
- List: Schistophyllum adianthoides subsp. collinum (Mitt.) Lindb.; Schistophyllum collinum (Mitt.) Lindb.; Schistophyllum cristatum (Wilson ex Mitt.) Lindb.; Schistophyllum decipiens (De Not.) Lindb.; Fissidens pseudogymnogynus Toyama; Fissidens rupestris Wilson; Fissidens savatieri (Besch.) Paris; Fissidens velenovskyi Podp.; Fissidens adianthoides var. cristatus (Wilson ex Mitt.) F.Koppe; Fissidens adianthoides var. savatieri Besch.; Fissidens adianthoides var. semicristatus Grout; Fissidens circinans Müll.Hal.; Fissidens collinus Mitt.; Fissidens cristatus Wilson ex Mitt.; Fissidens cristatus var. winonensis (Renauld & Cardot) Grout; Fissidens decipiens De Not.; Fissidens decipiens var. winonensis Renauld & Cardot; Fissidens erosodentatus Cardot; Fissidens floridanus Lesq. & James; Fissidens koshikijimensis Sakurai; Fissidens microjaponicus Paris; Fissidens obsoleto-marginatus Müll.Hal.; Fissidens cristatus f. major Mönk.; Fissidens adianthoides var. brevifolius (Lindb. ex Braithw.) J.J.Amann; Fissidens adianthoides var. collinus (Mitt.) Braithw.; Fissidens adianthoides subsp. decipiens (De Not.) Boulay; Fissidens adianthoides var. marginatus (P.Beauv. ex Bach. Pyl.) Brid.; Fissidens adianthoides var. rupestris (Wilson) Limpr.; Fissidens adianthoides var. tener Molendo; Fissidens cristatus var. brevifolius Lindb. ex Braithw.; Fissidens cristatus f. corticicolus Latzel; Fissidens cristatus f. immarginatus Habeeb; Fissidens cristatus f. velenovskyi (Podp.) Podp.; Fissidens decipiens var. polysetus J.J.Amann; Skitophyllum adianthoides var. marginatum P.Beauv. ex Bach. Pyl.; Fissidens adianthoides subsp. cristatus (Wilson ex Mitt.) Kindb.; Fissidens adianthoides var. rupestris (Wilson) Rau & Herv.; Fissidens cristatus var. velenovskyi (Podp.) Warnst.

= Fissidens dubius =

Species of moss

Fissidens dubius, commonly known as the rock-pocket moss, is a species of moss belonging to the family Fissidentaceae. First described by Palisot de Beauvois in 1805 from material collected in Philadelphia, it is a relatively large moss growing up to 5 cm (2 in) tall that forms loose to dense mats on calcareous substrates. The species is characterised by its serrated leaf margins, pale border of thick-walled cells, and typically dioicous reproduction. It has a broad global distribution across Europe, North and South America, Asia, North Africa, and New Zealand, occurring in various habitats from lowlands to alpine zones, particularly in shaded locations on basic soils and rocks. While morphologically similar to F. adianthoides, F. dubius is distinguished by its smaller leaf cells and irregularly thickened leaf tips. The species is classified as Least Concern due to its stable populations and absence of major threats.

== Taxonomy ==
The species was first described by the French botanist Palisot de Beauvois in 1805 from material he had collected in the United States, probably in Philadelphia. The specific epithet dubius means "doubtful" in Latin. In Beauvois's initial description, the only distinctive characteristic noted was the serrated leaf margin.

The species has several synonyms: F. cristatus Wils. ex Mitt., F. decipiens De Not., and F. rupestris Wils. ex Jaeg. Initially after its description, F. dubius was regarded as a synonym of F. subbasilaris (Bridel 1806) or F. adianthoides (Arnott 1825). The species was then forgotten for over half a century until Wilson (in Mitten & Wilson 1857) gave the name F. cristatus to a plant collected from Mt. Khasia, India. The same species was later discovered in Europe and named F. decipiens by De Notaris (1863) and F. rupestris by Wilson (1865).

A variety, F. dubius var. mucronatus, differs from the typical variety by having a shortly excurrent costa, smaller stature, and by growing as an earth moss rather than on rock.

== Description ==
Fissidens dubius is a relatively large moss that forms loose to dense mats on surfaces. The plants range in colour from light to dark green, though specimens found at higher elevations often take on a brownish tinge. Individual stems can grow up to 5 cm (2 in) in length, with leaves arranged in two opposite rows along the stem.

The leaves themselves are 2–3.5 mm long and shaped like elongated tongues (tongue-lanceolate) or eggs (ovate-lanceolate). They have several distinctive features: the edges of each leaf have 3–4 rows of thick-walled cells forming a pale border, and the upper portions are marked by coarse, irregular teeth. The leaf blade is partially double-layered, making it somewhat opaque, with surface cells measuring 6–12 μm in width.

The plant's reproductive structures (gametangia) develop in small buds that form in the leaf axils (the angles between leaves and stem) around the middle portion of the stems. While the species can occasionally reproduce with both male and female organs on the same plant (autoicous), it typically has them on separate plants (dioicous). When present, the spore-producing capsules are borne on reddish stalks and held at a slight angle.

=== Similar species ===
The species is close in appearance to F. adianthoides, but can be distinguished by its smaller and mamillose leaf cells and apical laminae irregularly one or two cells thick. The border of pale cells and the serrulate leaf margin are also more pronounced in F. dubius than in F. adianthoides.

== Habitat and distribution ==
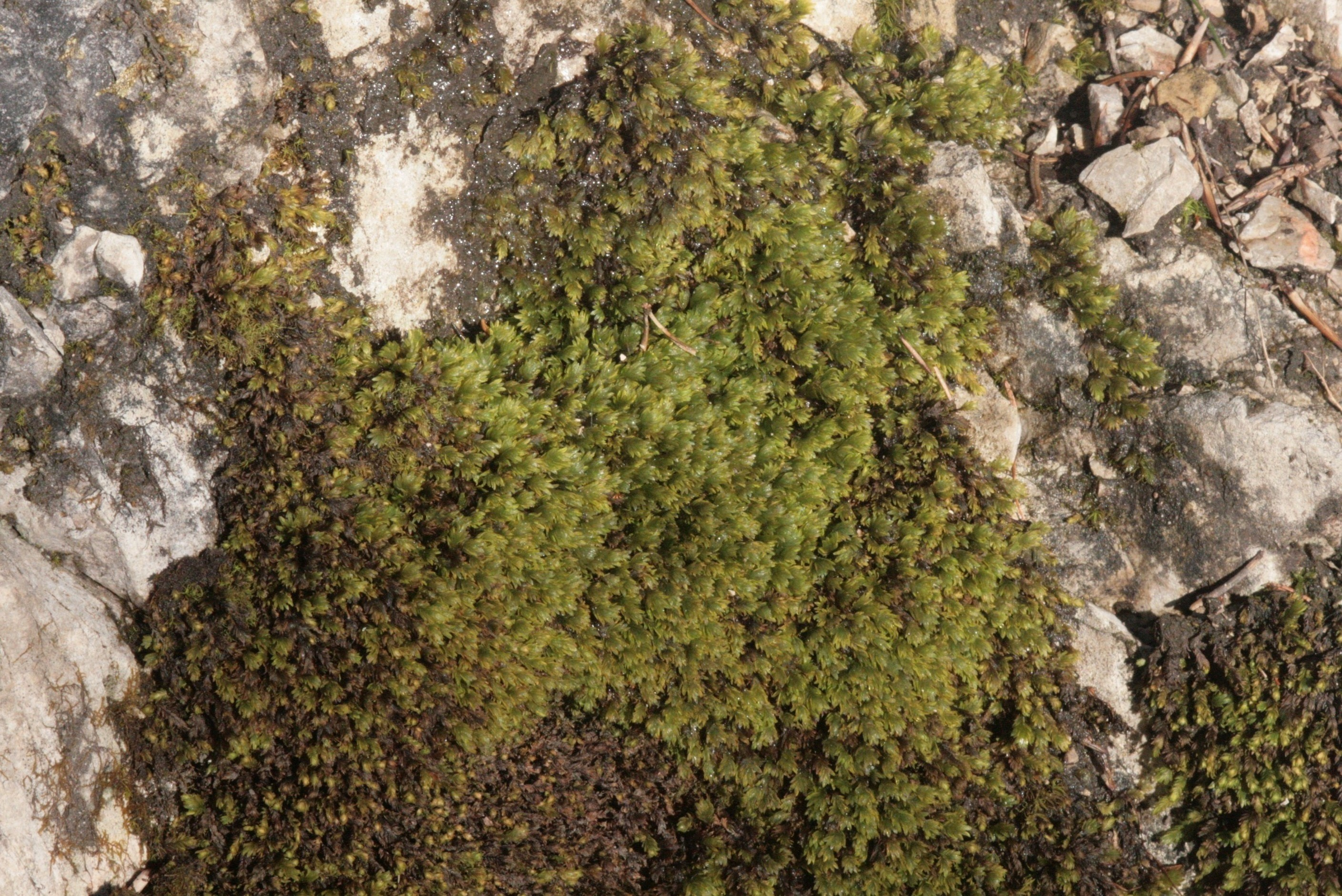
Colony growing on calcareous rock, showing its typical mat-forming growth habit and light green colouration

Fissidens dubius grows primarily in calcareous (lime-rich) rock formations and other base-rich environments within forested areas. It can be found from lowland to alpine zones, though it shows a preference for shaded locations. The moss grows on various substrates including carbonate rock, base-rich silicate rock, humus-rich soil in limestone areas, dead wood, and the bases of trees. It grows in conditions that are moderately dry to moist, and where the pH ranges from neutral to basic.

The species has a broad global distribution, occurring across Europe, North and South America, Asia, North Africa, and New Zealand. Throughout its range, it can be found in various habitats including moist grasslands, rock crevices, woodlands, and near water courses. The European populations are considered stable with no major threats to their survival. Within Switzerland, the species has been documented at elevations ranging from 200 to 2,400 m (660 to 7,870 ft) above sea level, and is found throughout the country's major geographical regions including the Jura Mountains, the Swiss Plateau, and the Alps.

Genetic diversity studies of Chinese populations using inter-simple sequence repeat molecular markers (DNA fragments located between microsatellite sequences that are amplified via PCR to study genetic diversity) revealed high genetic variation between different geographic populations, with analysis of 14 populations across five provinces showing that over 72% of genetic variation exists between populations rather than within them, suggesting the species' diversity is strongly influenced by geographic isolation.

== Reproduction ==
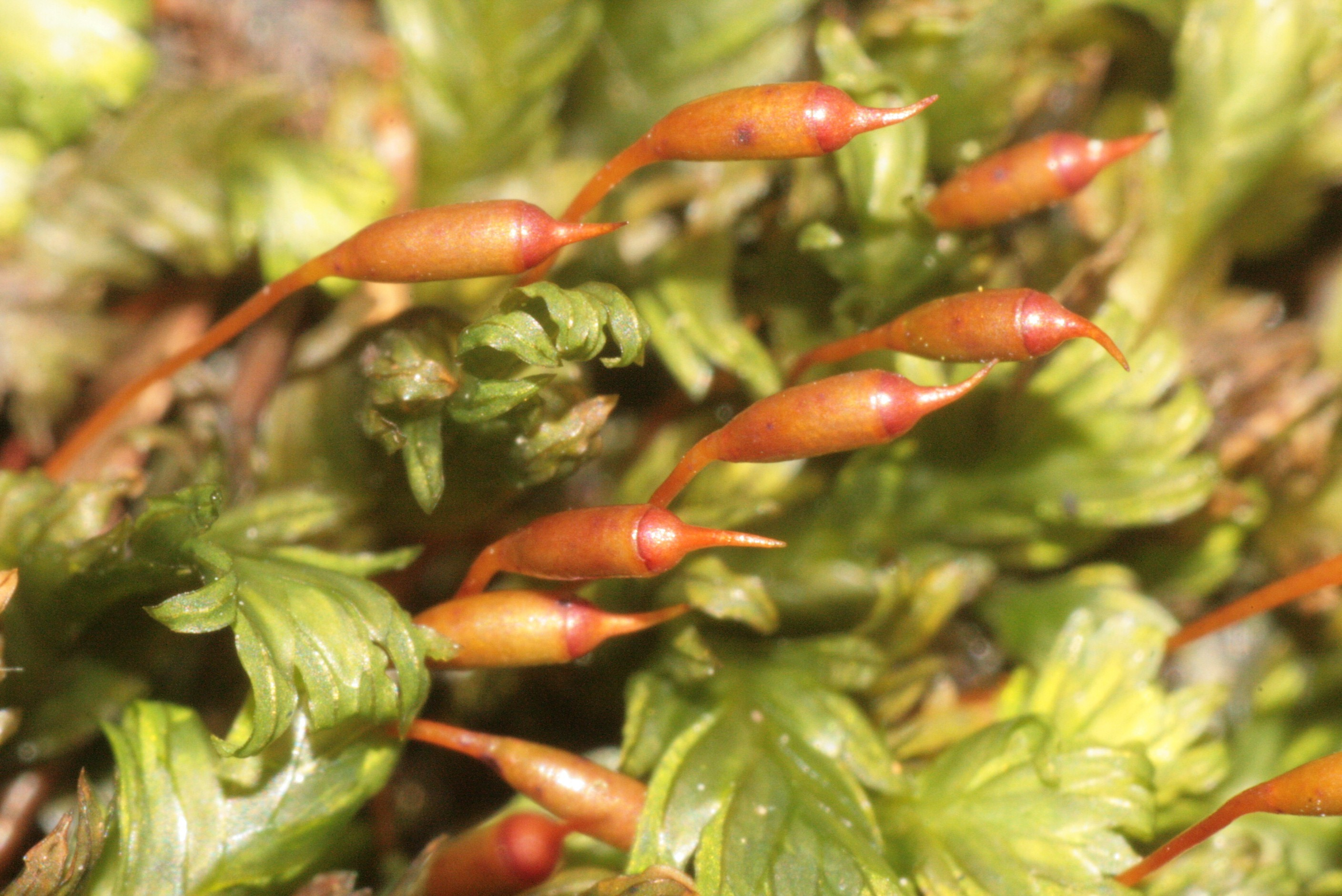
Sporophytes showing the characteristic reddish setae and angled capsules

Fissidens dubius primarily reproduces sexually through spores, with male and female reproductive organs typically occurring on separate plants (dioicous), though rarely they may be found on the same plant. The reproductive structures develop in specialised buds that form in the angles between the leaves and stem, concentrated in the middle portion of the plant. When fertilisation is successful, spore capsules develop, which are carried on reddish stalks (setae) and positioned at a slight angle. While the species is capable of producing spores, this occurs only moderately frequently.

== Conservation ==
No specific conservation measures are required for Fissidens dubius. The species is classified as Least Concern (LC) in both European and EU 28 regional assessments due to its stable population trends and absence of major threats. The moss occurs within protected areas throughout its range and continues to maintain healthy populations without active intervention.
