= Fissidens pokhrensis =

Scientific classification
- Kingdom: Plantae
- Division: Bryophyta
- Class: Bryopsida
- Subclass: Dicranidae
- Order: Dicranales
- Family: Fissidentaceae
- Genus: Fissidens
- Species: F. pokhrensis

Binomial name
- Fissidens pokhrensis Nork. ex S. S. Kumar

Species of moss

Fissidens pokhrensis is a species of moss in the monogeneric family Fissidentaceae.

== Habitat and distribution ==
Fissidens pokhrensis grows in rocky patches and land cuttings in low altitude degraded evergreen forests. It is endemic to India and is found in the Western Himalayas and Western Ghats of Tamil Nadu and Kerala.

== Description ==
The 2–3.2 mm (0.079–0.126 in) tall plant has leaves in 5-8 pairs, which curl when dry. Leaves are ovate, lingulate with serrulate margins and acute apex. At Mangattuparamba Neeliyar Kottam, they were observed to be growing corticolous on a tree.
