= Fissidens grandifrons =

Scientific classification
- Kingdom: Plantae
- Division: Bryophyta
- Class: Bryopsida
- Subclass: Dicranidae
- Order: Dicranales
- Family: Fissidentaceae
- Genus: Fissidens
- Species: F. grandifrons

Binomial name
- Fissidens grandifrons Brid.

Species of moss

Fissidens grandifrons is a moss which is the largest of the family Fissidentaceae. It is found in turbulent water which it needs to get its carbon dioxide.

Its fronds were held to be reminiscent of phoenix feathers by the Chinese.
