= Fissidens pusillus =

Scientific classification
- Kingdom: Plantae
- Division: Bryophyta
- Class: Bryopsida
- Subclass: Dicranidae
- Order: Dicranales
- Family: Fissidentaceae
- Genus: Fissidens
- Species: F. pusillus

Binomial name
- Fissidens pusillus (Wilson) Milde

Synonyms
- List: Fissidens bryoides var. pusillus (Wilson) Pursell; Fissidens incurvus subsp. pusillus (Wilson) Boulay; Fissidens incurvus subsp. pusillus (Wilson) Schimp.; Fissidens incurvus var. lylei (Wilson) Hunt; Fissidens minutulus subsp. pusillus (Wilson) Wijk & Margad.; Fissidens minutulus var. irriguus (Limpr.) Pilous; Fissidens pusillus var. irriguus Limpr.; Fissidens pusillus var. lylei (Wilson) Braithw.; Fissidens pusillus var. madidus Spruce; Fissidens viridulus var. lylei Wilson; Fissidens viridulus var. pusillus Wilson; Schistophyllum incurvum subsp. pusillum (Wilson) Lindb.; Schistophyllum pusillum (Wilson) Lindb.

Species of moss

Fissidens pusillus is a species of moss. It was first described by William M. Wilson as the variety pusillus of the species Fissidens viridulus in 1855.
