= Fissidens polypodioides =

Scientific classification
- Kingdom: Plantae
- Division: Bryophyta
- Class: Bryopsida
- Subclass: Dicranidae
- Order: Dicranales
- Family: Fissidentaceae
- Genus: Fissidens
- Species: F. polypodioides

Binomial name
- Fissidens polypodioides Hedw.

Species of moss

Fissidens polypodioides is a species of moss first classified by Johannes Hedwig.
