= Fissidens elegans =

Scientific classification
- Kingdom: Plantae
- Division: Bryophyta
- Class: Bryopsida
- Subclass: Dicranidae
- Order: Dicranales
- Family: Fissidentaceae
- Genus: Fissidens
- Species: F. elegans

Binomial name
- Fissidens elegans Bridel, 1806

Species of liverwort

Fissidens elegans is a species of moss belonging to the family Fissidentaceae.

A study in tropical Ecuador found that Fissidens elegans was typically found in urban environments, suggesting that the species is tolerant to anthropogenic effects such as the presence of wastewater and heavy metal pollution.
