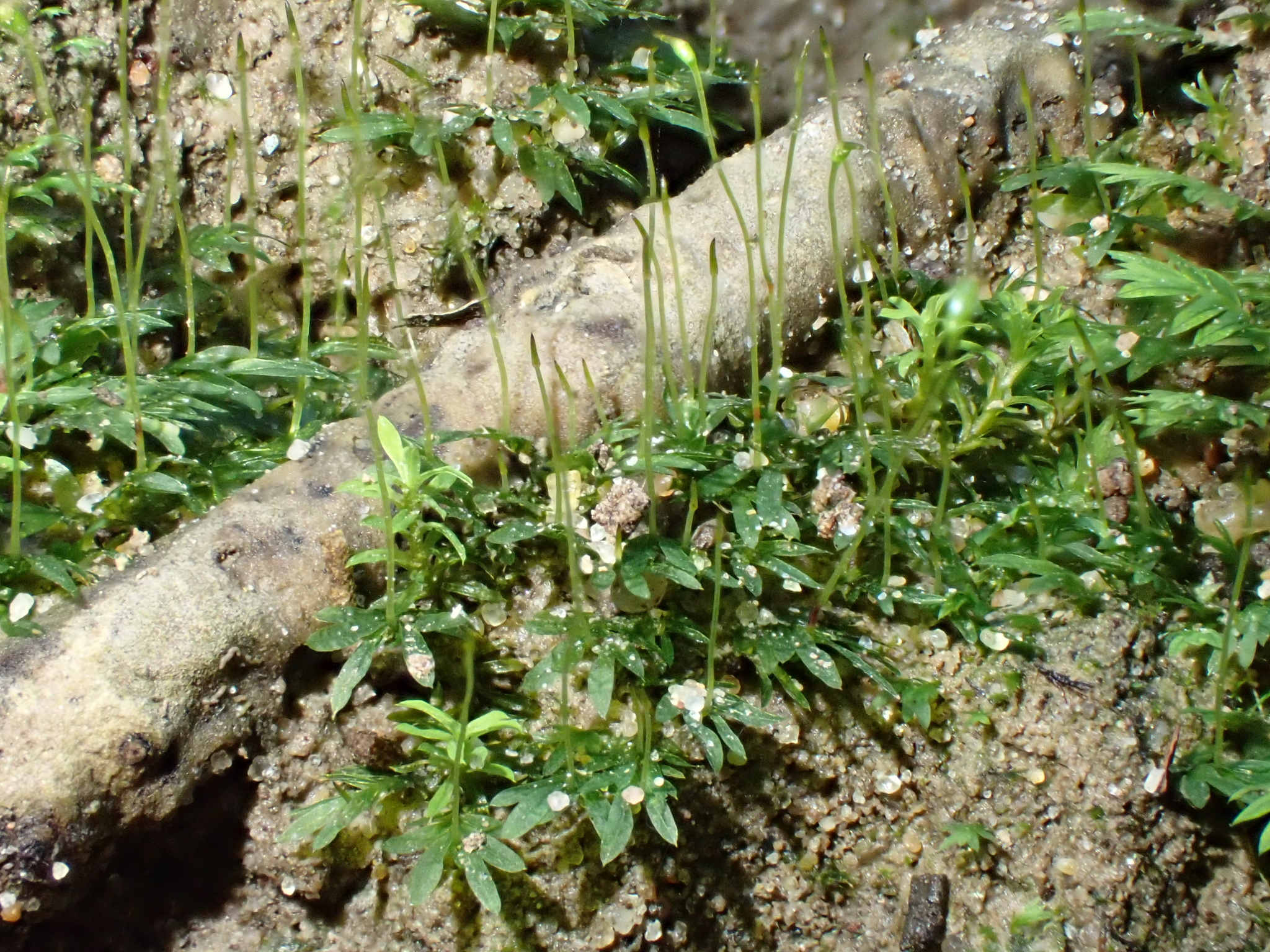

Scientific classification
- Kingdom: Plantae
- Division: Bryophyta
- Class: Bryopsida
- Subclass: Dicranidae
- Order: Dicranales
- Family: Fissidentaceae
- Genus: Fissidens
- Species: F. exilis

Binomial name
- Fissidens exilis Hedwig, 1801

= Fissidens exilis =

Species of moss

Fissidens exilis is a species of moss belonging to the family Fissidentaceae.

It has cosmopolitan distribution.
