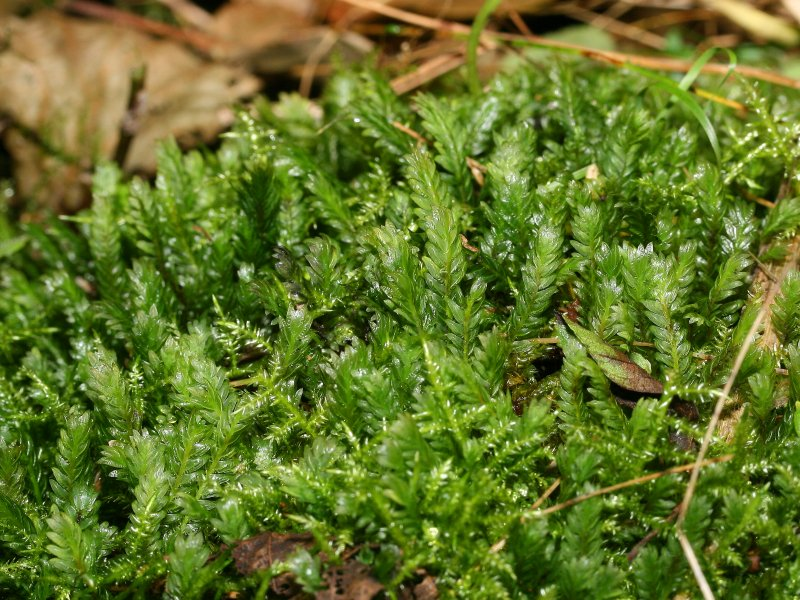

Conservation status
- Secure (NatureServe)

Scientific classification
- Kingdom: Plantae
- Division: Bryophyta
- Class: Bryopsida
- Subclass: Dicranidae
- Order: Dicranales
- Family: Fissidentaceae
- Genus: Fissidens
- Species: F. adianthoides

Binomial name
- Fissidens adianthoides Hedw.
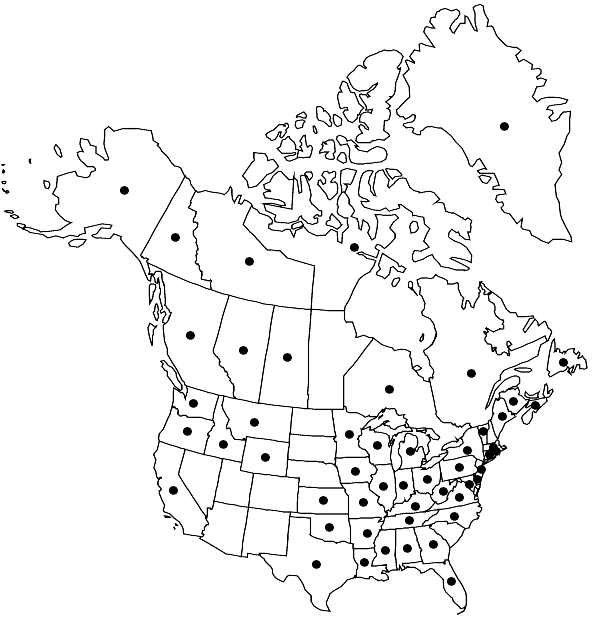
- The map shows where Fissidens adianthoides is found in North America.

= Fissidens adianthoides =

Species of moss

Fissidens adianthoides, the maidenhair pocketmoss, is a North American moss in the family Fissidentaceae. It was first described by Johann Hedwig in 1801. The Nitinaht First Nations of Vancouver Island have used maidenhair moss to bandage wounds. It was named by the Anglo-Saxons based on its resemblance to pubic hair.

== Description ==
The plant itself is about 85 x 5mm. It is dioicous. Dioicous is defined as a plant having the male (antheridia) and female (archegonia) reproductive organs in separate individuals. An archegonium is a multicellular reproductive organ that produces female gametes. The antheridium is the male structure that holds, creates and releases sperm. It is a very robust plant and forms dark green to brown-green turfs.

=== Gametophyte ===
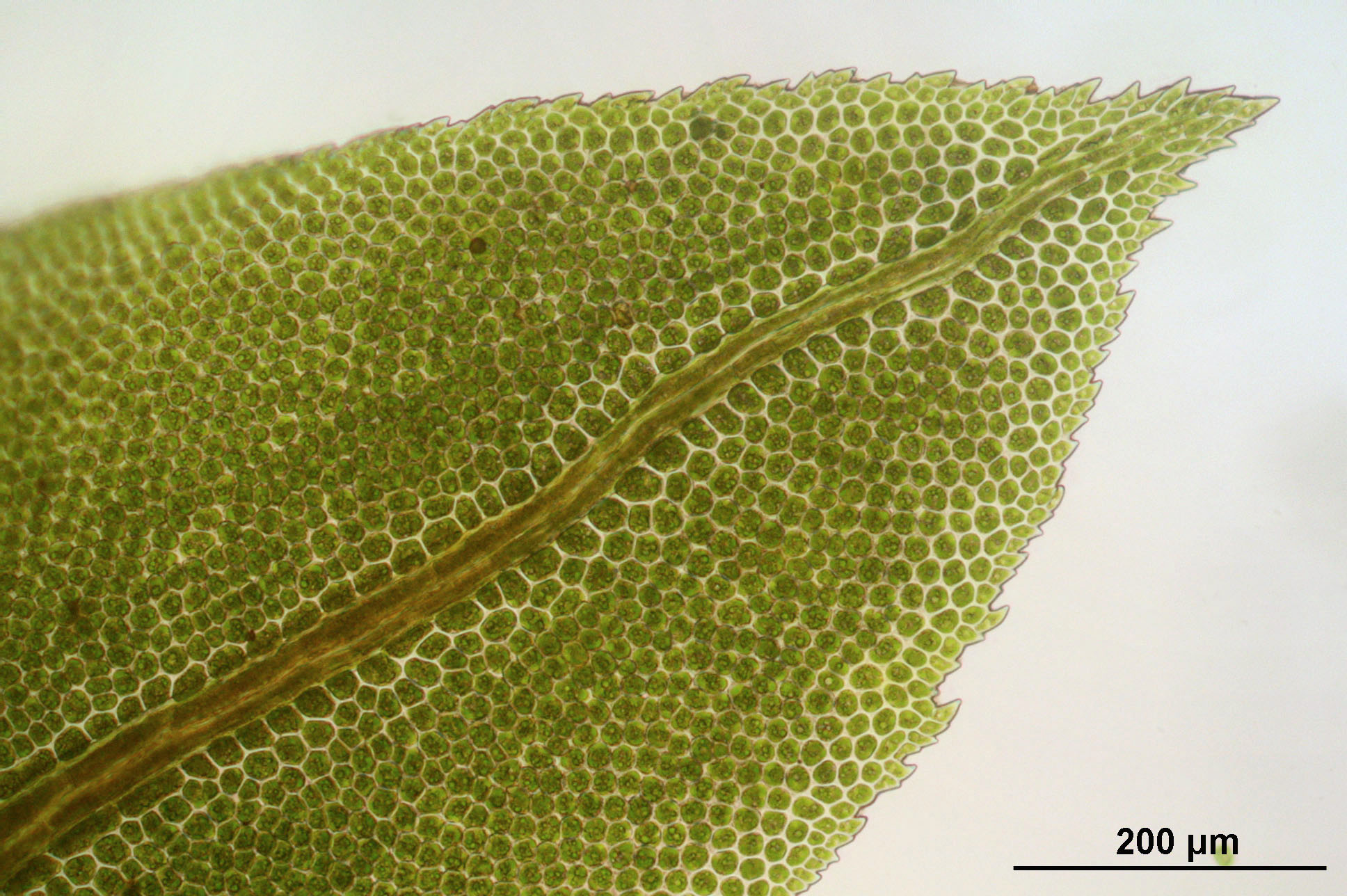
Fissidens adianthoides leaf.

==== Stem ====
The stem is extremely branched. Fissidens adianthoides have a central strand. The central strand contains thin-walled cells called hydroids that conduct water and stereids which provide structural support.

==== Leaf ====
There are about 60 pairs of leaves that are slightly undulate (wavy) in texture. The shape is oblong to lanceolate (narrow oval) and tapered to an acute point. Sometimes the leaf can be obtuse in shape. The lamina also known as the leaf blade, is round and then narrows towards the apex. The leaf margin is crenulate (finely scalloped) to regular serrulate (sawlike). The marginal cells are often thinner with thicker cell walls. There are about 2-3 cells in the costa. The leaf cells are very turgid and irregularly round-like hexagons. These leaf cells are unistratose which means they are single layered. They are also smooth and firm-walled.

=== Reproductive structures ===
==== Perigonium ====
The perigonium is the reproductive structure which holds the male organs. It is made up of an antheridia, paraphyses and perigonial leaves. Paraphyses are upright sterile filament-like structures that support the reproductive apparatus of bryophytes.

==== Perichaetium ====
The perichaetium is reproductive structure which holds the female organs. It is made up of an archegonia, paraphyses, and perichaetial leaves. The perichaetium is located on short axillary branches.

=== Sporophyte ===
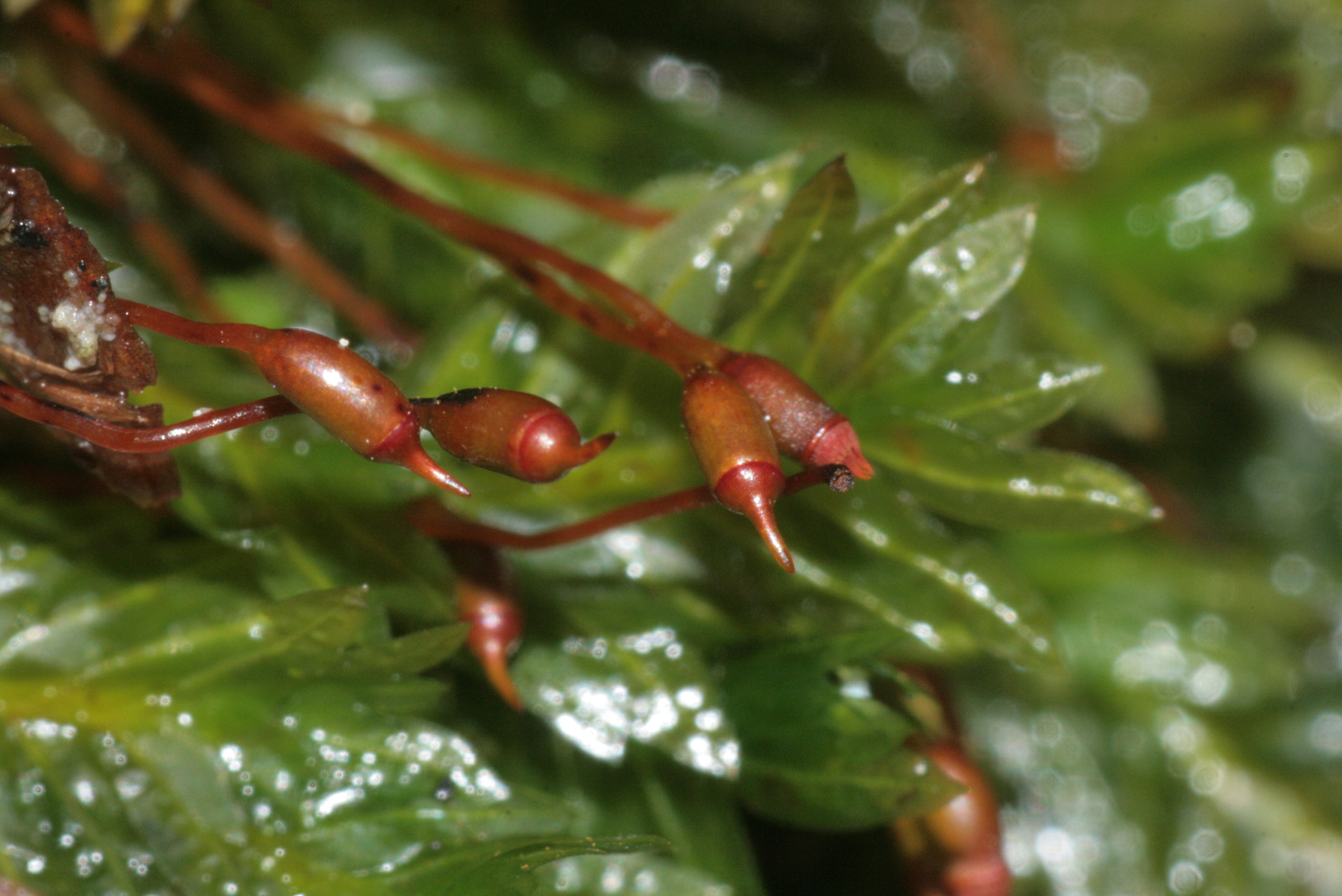
The Fissidens adianthoides sporophytes.

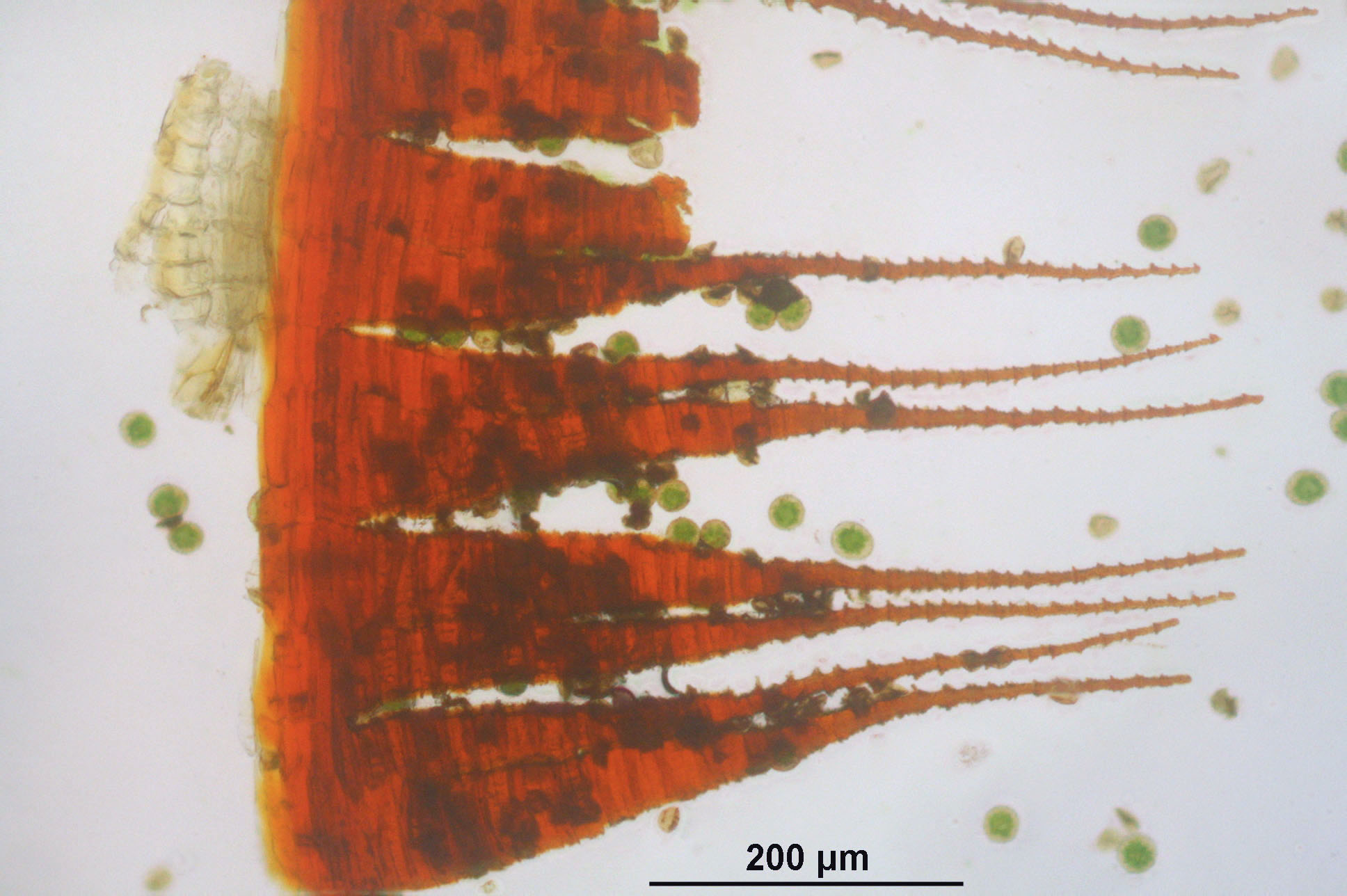
The peristomal teeth of Fissidens adianthoides.

A sporophyte is the diploid multicellular stage in the life cycle of a moss which produces spores. They are commonly observed in this species. There is one sporophyte produced per perichaetium. The seta, which is a stalk that supports capsule, is relatively short and is 25 mm in length. It is red-brown in colour and inserted laterally. The operculum (lid) is about the same length as the rest of the sporangium. The capsule of the sporophyte is inclined, curved, bilaterally symmetric and about 1.5 mm. As for the calyptra, it is cucullate, smooth and about 2.5 mm. The spores are about 3-22 μm.

Since it is a member of the Bryopsida class it also has arthrodontous peristome teeth which aid in spore dispersal. Fissidens adianthoides have 16 red teeth. Arthrodontous teeth are made up of cell wall fragments. They are also hygroscopic, meaning they move according to changes in humidity. They are about 85–120 μm wide at the base of the teeth and the upper part of the teeth are finely papillose.

== Taxonomy ==
=== Closely related species ===
Fissidens adianthoides is often confused with many similar species such as F. osmundioides. They both have similar laminal cells. Also they have a serrate leaf apex. The only feature that differentiates the two is that F. osmundioideshas terminal perichaetia and rhizoids papillose in nature.

Another species that it often gets confused with is Fissidens dubius. They both have short perichaetial stems in the top of the proximal leaves and a lighter marginal laminal cell band. The difference between the two is that F. adianthoides is a lot tinier and have more obscure laminal cells that are usually double stratose and irregular. According to molecular studies by L.E. Anderson and V. S. Bryan (1956), they are not closely related.

F. serrulatus is a very similar species as well. However, it has longer leaves and grows on damp soil or gravel nearby very shady streams.

The features that distinguish Fissidens adianthoides from other similar species are by its "unistratose, smooth laminal cells, a lighter band of marginal laminal cells, and its short perichaetial stems." Other distinguishing features are the pronounced teeth on the leaf margins and the tendency for this species to be soft with leaf points that curl downward when dry.

=== Family Fissidentaceae ===
Fissidentaceae is a morphologically homogeneous group that is defined by its distinct leaf structure. The leaf is made of two laminae; a dorsal lamina and an apical lamina. They are also arranged in double vertical rows on the stem in the same plane and attachment.

A molecular phylogenetic study states that the families Fissidentaceae and Dicranaceae are closely related.

=== Genus Fissidens ===
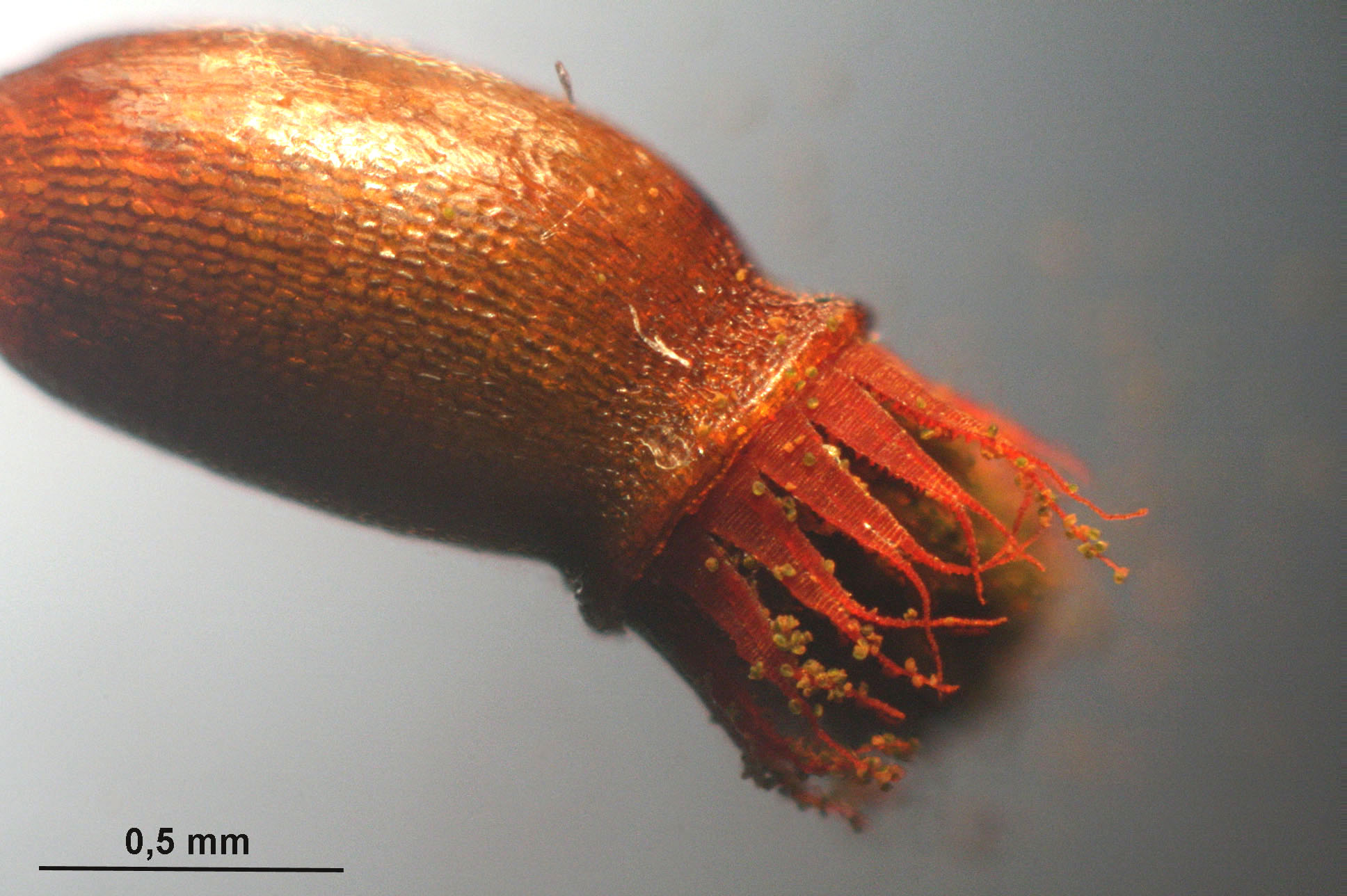
Fissidens adianthoides peristomal teeth.

Fissidentaceae is an acrocarpous family that is made up of haplolepideous mosses and consists of one genus called Fissidens. Fissidens comprises about 440 species. However, this genus is rather poorly studied phylogenetically compared to other mosses in Bryophyta. Most of the species can be found in humid, warm and tropical areas of the globe and the number of species decreases proportionally to the decrease in latitude.

The peristome teeth of Fissidens are morphologically identical to the members of the family Dicranaceae.

In the study, "Molecular phylogeny of the genus Fissidens (Fissidentaceae, Bryophyta) and a refinement of the infrageneric classification", they have constructed a phylogenetic tree of 50 Fissidens species using DNA sequence of the rbcL and rps4 gene. It was based on the ancestral similarities between the peristomal teeth, limbidium and chromosome number. Based on their findings, three subgenera were created: Pachyfissidens, Neoamblyothallia, and Fissidens. The subgenus Fissidens was made up of five sections: Fissidens, Polypodiopsis, Aloma, Areofissidens, and Semilimbidium.

== Distribution and habitat ==
=== Distribution ===
Worldwide distribution: It is vastly distributed in the forests of the Northern Hemisphere, extending from the arctic, alpine and prairie regions, often in more sheltered locations. It is widely distributed across North America.

National and state/provincial distribution of Fissidens adianthoides is as follows:

Canada: AB, BC, LB, NB, NF, NS, NT, NU, ON, QC, SK, YT

United States: AK, AL, AR, CA, CT, DE, FL, GA, IA, ID, IL, IN, KS, KY, LA, MA, MD, ME, MI, MN, MO, MS, MT, NC, NJ, NY, OH, OK, OR, PA, RI, TN, TX, VA, VT, WA, WI, WV, WY

=== Habitat ===
It is found in shady sites such as nearby moving water, near waterfalls, soil, open fields of grass, around the forest floor, decaying wood, on dripping limestone and stone rocks. This moss can be commonly found on damp or wet soil and peat. It is scarcely found on decaying wood.

== Life cycle ==
The process of sporic meiosis.

Fissidens adianthoides has sporic meiosis as well as asexual reproduction. Sporic meiosis is the alternation of heteromorphic generations and is characterized by each phase having a different free-living phase: one is the gametophyte which is usually haploid while the other is a sporophyte which is often diploid. Additionally, sporic meiosis is a type of life cycle where meiosis results in spores not gametes. The haploid gametophyte makes gametes from mitosis and the two gametes combine to form a zygote (2n), which then develops into a sporophyte. The sporophyte creates spores via meiosis which are haploid and then develops into the gametophyte.

There are two forms of asexual reproduction in this species. The first is fragmentation where the bryophyte is broken into completely separate pieces and grows to become a new individual from the parent plant. The second method is regeneration from caducous organs. This is when the organs of the plant such as leaves, shoots, leaf apices, and branches detach from the parent shoot. As a result, the moss is able to regenerate from these detached areas and continues to survive.

== Uses ==
F. adianthoides was used in the past for bandaging wounds. It was noted that the First Natives of Nitinaht in Vancouver Island, Canada used this moss as well.

The genus Fissidens was used in several Asian countries like Bolivia as an antibacterial remedy for sore throats or other bacterial infections. Other usages included burning Fissidens to promote hair growth in China.

Currently, however, it serves no important economic or commercial usage.

== Response to herbicide ==
In a study of the effect of the herbicide Asulam on moss growth, Fissidens adianthoides was shown to have intermediate sensitivity to Asulam exposure.

== Conservation ==
Its Nature Serve conservation status is G5 which means its secure.
