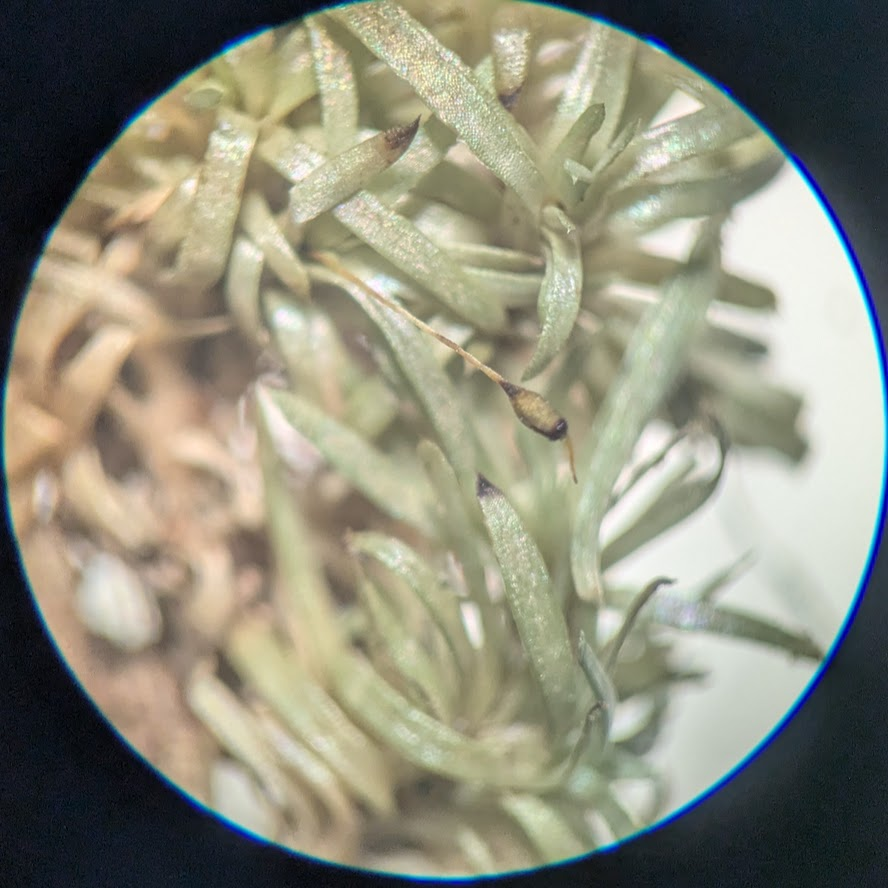
- Octoblepharum albidum as seen under a dissecting scope with a sporophyte.

Scientific classification
- Kingdom: Plantae
- Division: Bryophyta
- Class: Bryopsida
- Subclass: Dicranidae
- Order: Dicranales
- Family: Octoblepharaceae; A.Eddy ex M.Menzel
- Genus: Octoblepharum; Hedw.

= Octoblepharum =

Genus of haplolepideous mosses

Octoblepharum is a genus of haplolepideous mosses (Dicranidae) in the monotypic family Octoblepharaceae . The genus Octoblepharum was previously placed in family Calymperaceae.

== Species ==
The genus contains the following species:

- Octoblepharum africanum (Broth.) Cardot
- Octoblepharum albidum Hedw.
- Octoblepharum ampullaceum Mitt.
- Octoblepharum arthrocormoides N. Salazar & B.C. Tan
- Octoblepharum asperum Mitt.
- Octoblepharum blumii (Nees ex Hampe) Mitt.
- Octoblepharum brevisetum C.C. Towns.
- Octoblepharum cocuiense Mitt.
- Octoblepharum costatum H.A. Crum
- Octoblepharum cylindricum Schimp. ex Mont.
- Octoblepharum densifolium (Mitt.) Mitt.
- Octoblepharum dentatum Mitt.
- Octoblepharum depressum Müll. Hal.
- Octoblepharum ekmanii Thér.
- Octoblepharum erectifolium Mitt. ex R.S. Williams
- Octoblepharum exiguum Müll. Hal.
- Octoblepharum incrassatum Mitt.
- Octoblepharum leptoneuron Cardot
- Octoblepharum leucobryoides O. Yano
- Octoblepharum octoblepharoides (Brid.) Mitt.
- Octoblepharum papillosum Mitt.
- Octoblepharum pulvinatum (Dozy & Molk.) Mitt.
- Octoblepharum rhaphidostegium Müll. Hal. ex Broth.
- Octoblepharum schimperi (Dozy & Molk.) Mitt.
- Octoblepharum scolopendrium (Mitt.) Mitt.
- Octoblepharum squarrosum (Brid.) Mitt.
- Octoblepharum stramineum Mitt.
- Octoblepharum tatei (R.S. Williams) E.B. Bartram
