= Viridivellus =

Scientific classification
- Kingdom: Plantae
- Division: Bryophyta
- Class: Bryopsida
- Subclass: Dicranidae
- Order: Dicranales
- Family: Viridivelleraceae; I.G.Stone
- Genus: Viridivellus; I.G.Stone
- Species: V. pulchellum

Binomial name
- Viridivellus pulchellum I.G.Stone

Genus of haplolepideous mosses

Viridivellus is the only genus of moss in the family Viridivelleraceae. The only species is Viridivellus pulchellum.
