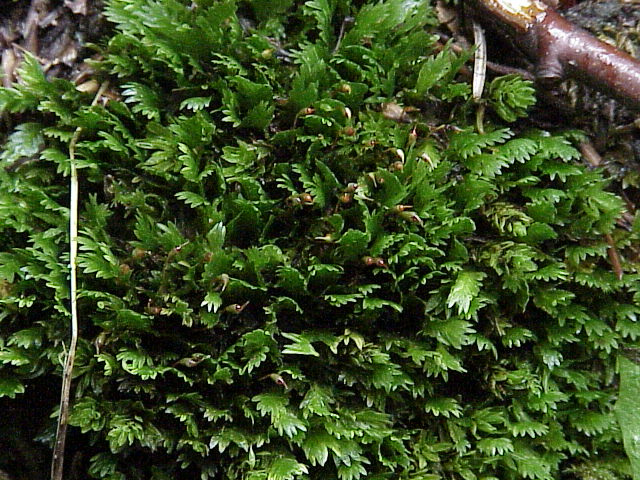
- Fissidens dubius

Scientific classification
- Kingdom: Plantae
- Division: Bryophyta
- Class: Bryopsida
- Subclass: Dicranidae
- Order: Dicranales
- Family: Fissidentaceae
- Genus: Fissidens; Hedw.

Species
- See text

Synonyms
- Conomitrium sect. Polypodiopsis Müll.Hal.; Heterodon Raf.; Fissidens sect. Pachyfissidens Müll.Hal.; Fissidentella Cardot; Moenkemeyera Müll.Hal.; Nanobryum Dixon; Octodiceras Brid.; Osmundula Rabenh.; Pachyfissidens (Müll.Hal.) Limpr.; Polypodiopsis (Müll.Hal.) A.Jaeger, nom. illeg.; Sainsburia Dixon; Schistophyllum Lindb., nom. illeg.; Skitophyllum Bach.Pyl., nom. illeg.; Simplicidens Herzog

= Fissidens =

Genus of haplolepideous mosses

Fissidens is the only genus of haplolepideous mosses (Dicranidae) in the family Fissidentaceae. It contains over 480 species.

== Morphology ==
Fissidens is an acrocarpous genus characterized by the presence of vaginal lamina on their leaves, which may be palmately or pinnately arranged. Each leaf consists of one dorsal lamina, which is the farthest away from the central strand, and two vaginal lamina which clasp the central strand. They are connected via a single costa, though this costa is infrequently nearly absent.

== Subordinate taxa ==
Fissidens is generally accepted to include multiple subgenera, though these are disputed from publication to publication. A 2004 publication on the infrageneric taxonomy included four: Aloma, Fissidens, Octodiceras, and Pachyfissidens. In 2018, the clade Fissidens was confirmed to be monophyletic and only three subgenera were recognized: Fissidens, Pachyfissidens, and the novel Neoamblyothallia.

Subsequent analysis of these clades found that the subgenera Aloma and Octodiceras as described by Pursell and Bruggeman-Nannenga in 2004, were strongly indicated to be monophyletic. Three sections described in 2018 were also indicated to be monophyletic, but none of the subgenera were. (Note: The monophyletic sections are Neoamblyothallia sect. Neoamblyothallia, Pachyfissidens sect. Pachyfissidens, and Fissidens sect. Aerofissidens.) This 2022 infrageneric analysis determined that all other subgenera and sections were nonmonophyletic.

== Included species ==
Selected species:

- Fissidens acacioides Schrad.
- Fissidens aciphyllus Dixon
- Fissidens acreanus Irmsch.
- Fissidens acrophilus Brugg.-Nann.
- Fissidens adianthoides Hedw.
- Fissidens afropapillosus P.de la Varde
- Fissidens aggestus (Besch.) Paris
- Fissidens ah-pengae Brugg.-Nann.
- Fissidens albolimbatus Dixon
- Fissidens allionii Broth.
- Fissidens allorgei P.de la Varde
- Fissidens alomoides Müll.Hal. ex Dusén
- Fissidens altisetus Dixon
- Fissidens amazonicus Pursell
- Fissidens amoenus Müll.Hal.
- Fissidens amplifolius Dixon & P.de la Varde
- Fissidens andicola (Herzog) Brugg.-Nann.
- Fissidens androgynus Bruch
- Fissidens angustelimbatus Mitt.
- Fissidens angustiusculus Dixon & P.de la Varde
- Fissidens angustus Thwaites & Mitt.
- Fissidens anisophyllus Dixon
- Fissidens annamensis Paris & Broth.
- Fissidens anomalus Mont.
- †Fissidens antiquus Saporta
- Fissidens antrophyi Müll.Hal.
- Fissidens aoraiensis H.Whittier & H.A.Mill.
- Fissidens aphelotaxifolius Pursell
- Fissidens appalachensis R.H.Zander
- Fissidens arboricola Brugg.-Nann.
- Fissidens arcticus Bryhn
- Fissidens argyroloma P.de la Varde
- Fissidens aristifer Brugg.-Nann.
- Fissidens arnigadhensis Broth. ex S.S.Kumar
- Fissidens arnoldi R.Ruthe
- Fissidens artsii Brugg.-Nann.
- Fissidens arunii J.P.Srivast. & Nork.
- Fissidens asplenioides Hedw.
- Fissidens asselii Bizot
- Fissidens autoicus Thér. & Dixon
- Fissidens axilliflorus Thwaites & Mitt.
- Fissidens azoricus (P.de la Varde) Bizot
- Fissidens badyinbarus I.G.Stone
- Fissidens bassilae Alia, Brugg.-Nann. & Reeb
- Fissidens beccarii (Hampe) Broth.
- Fissidens beckettii Mitt.
- Fissidens benitotanii Z.Iwats., K.T.Yong & Tad.Suzuki
- Fissidens berteroi (Mont.) Müll.Hal.
- Fissidens bessouensis Corb.
- Fissidens biformis Mitt.
- Fissidens bifrons Schimp. ex Müll.Hal.
- Fissidens bilaspurensis Gangulee
- Fissidens bilewskyi P.de la Varde
- Fissidens bistratosus Brugg.-Nann.
- Fissidens blechnoides J.E.Beever
- Fissidens bogoriensis M.Fleisch.
- Fissidens bogosicus Müll.Hal.
- Fissidens boninensis Z.Iwats.
- Fissidens borgenii Hampe
- Fissidens bourgaeanus Besch.
- Fissidens brachypus Mitt.
- Fissidens brassii E.B.Bartram
- Fissidens braunii (Müll.Hal.) Dozy & Molk.
- Fissidens brevidorsus Dixon
- Fissidens brevifrons Mitt.
- Fissidens brevinervis Broth.
- Fissidens brevipes Besch.
- Fissidens brindae Pursell & B.H.Allen
- Fissidens bryoides Hedw.
- Fissidens bushii (Cardot & Thér.) Cardot & Thér.
- Fissidens cagoui Frank Müll., Pursell & Brugg.-Nann.
- Fissidens canalae Broth. & Paris
- Fissidens capitulatus Nog.
- Fissidens capriviensis Magill
- Fissidens carnosus Broth.
- Fissidens celticus Paton
- Fissidens ceylonensis Dozy & Molk.
- Fissidens chioneurus Müll.Hal.
- Fissidens chiricahuensis Pursell & B.H.Allen
- Fissidens chitralensis P.de la Varde
- Fissidens circinalis Mitt.
- Fissidens closteri Austin
- Fissidens coacervatus Brugg.-Nann.
- Fissidens compienei Broth. & Paris
- Fissidens consociatus Thér.
- Fissidens costivelatus Brugg.-Nann.
- Fissidens dubius P.Beauv.
- Fissidens elegans Brid.
- Fissidens exilis Hedw.
- Fissidens grandifrons Brid.
- Fissidens hydropogon Spruce ex Mitt.
- Fissidens inconspicuus Mitt.
- Fissidens incurvus Starke ex Röhl.
- Fissidens integerrimus Mitt.
- Fissidens intramarginatus (Hampe) A.Jaeger
- Fissidens intromarginatulus E.B.Bartram
- Fissidens involutus Wilson ex Mitt.
- Fissidens iwatsukii Brugg.-Nann.
- Fissidens jaiorum H.Whittier & H.A.Mill.
- Fissidens jansenii Sérgio & Pursell
- Fissidens javanicus Dozy & Molk.
- Fissidens jeffreyi Bizot
- Fissidens jonesii Bizot
- Fissidens jungermannioides Griff.
- Fissidens jungermanniopsis Müll.Hal.
- Fissidens juruensis Broth.
- Fissidens kalimpongensis Gangulee
- Fissidens kamiyamae Tad.Suzuki & Z.Iwats.
- Fissidens kammadensis Manju, K.P.Rajesh & Madhus.
- Fissidens karataviensis Samsel
- Fissidens karwarensis Dixon
- Fissidens kiguchii Tad.Suzuki
- Fissidens kilaueae Hoe & H.A.Crum
- Fissidens kinabaluensis Z.Iwats.
- Fissidens kondoi Sakurai
- Fissidens kosaninii Latzel
- Fissidens kurzii Müll.Hal.
- Fissidens lachmannii Bizot
- Fissidens lagenarius Mitt.
- Fissidens lancifolius E.B.Bartram
- Fissidens laosianus Dixon
- Fissidens latelimbatus Brugg.-Nann.
- Fissidens lateriticus K.M.Manjula, Manju & K.P.Rajesh
- Fissidens lautokensis Dixon
- †Fissidens microstictus Dixon & Luisier
- Fissidens pokhrensis Nork. ex S. S. Kumar
- Fissidens polypodioides Hedw.
- Fissidens pusillus (Wilson) Milde
- Fissidens serratus C.Müller
- Fissidens taxifolius Hedw.
- Fissidens usambaricus Broth.
