= List of Sites of Special Scientific Interest in Mid Argyll and Cowal =

The following is a list of Sites of Special Scientific Interest in the Mid Argyll and Cowal Area of Search. For other areas, see List of SSSIs by Area of Search.

- Ardchyline Wood
- Ardpatrick and Dunmore Woods
- Artilligan and Abhain Srathain Burns
- Beinn an Lochain
- Ben Lui
- Central Lochs Bute
- Craighoyle Woodland
- Craignure Mine
- Ellary Woods
- Garabal Hill
- Glen Loin
- Glen Ralloch To Baravalla Woods
- Glendaruel Wood and Crags
- Hells Glen
- Inverneil Burn
- Kilberry Coast
- Knapdale Lochs
- Knapdale Woods
- Linne Mhuirich
- Loch Eck
- Moine Mhor
- North End of Bute
- Ruel Estuary
- Strone Point, North Loch Fyne
- Taynish Woods
- Tayvallich Juniper and Fen
- Ulva, Danna and The McCormaig Isles
- West Tayvallich Peninsula
