= List of Areas of Special Scientific Interest in County Londonderry =

This is a list of the Areas of Special Scientific Interest (ASSIs) in County Londonderry in Northern Ireland, United Kingdom.

In Northern Ireland the body responsible for designating ASSIs is the Northern Ireland Environment Agency – a division of the Department of Environment (DoE).

Unlike the SSSIs, ASSIs include both natural environments and man-made structures. As with SSSIs, these sites are designated if they have criteria based on fauna, flora, geological or physiographical features. On top of this, structures are also covered, such as the Whitespots mines in Conlig, according to several criterion including rarity, recorded history and intrinsic appeal.

For other sites in the rest of the United Kingdom, see List of SSSIs by Area of Search.

Data is available from the Northern Ireland Environment Agency's website in the form of citation sheets for each ASSI.

- Aghanloo Wood ASSI
- Altikeeragh ASSI
- Altmover Glen ASSI
- Ballyknock ASSI
- Ballymacallion ASSI
- Ballymacombs More ASSI
- Ballynahone Bog ASSI
- Ballyrisk More ASSI
- Banagher Glen ASSI
- Bann Estuary ASSI
- Binevenagh ASSI
- Bonds Glen ASSI
- Bovevagh ASSI
- Carn / Glenshane Pass ASSI
- Castle River Valley ASSI
- Coolnasillagh ASSI
- Crockaghole Wood ASSI
- Curran Bog ASSI
- Dead Island Bog ASSI
- Drumbally Hill ASSI
- Errigal Glen ASSI
- Ervey Wood ASSI
- Gortcorbies ASSI
- Lough Beg ASSI
- Lower Creevagh ASSI
- Lough Foyle ASSI
- Lough Neagh ASSI
- Loughermore Mountain ASSI
- Magilligan ASSI
- Moneystaghan Bog ASSI
- Ness Wood ASSI
- River Faughan and Tributaries ASSI
- River Roe and Tributaries ASSI
- Smulgedon ASSI
- Sruhanleanantawey Burn ASSI
- Teal Lough and Slaghtfreeden Bogs ASSI
- Teal Lough Part II ASSI
- Toome ASSI
- Tully Hill ASSI
- Wolf Island Bog ASSI
