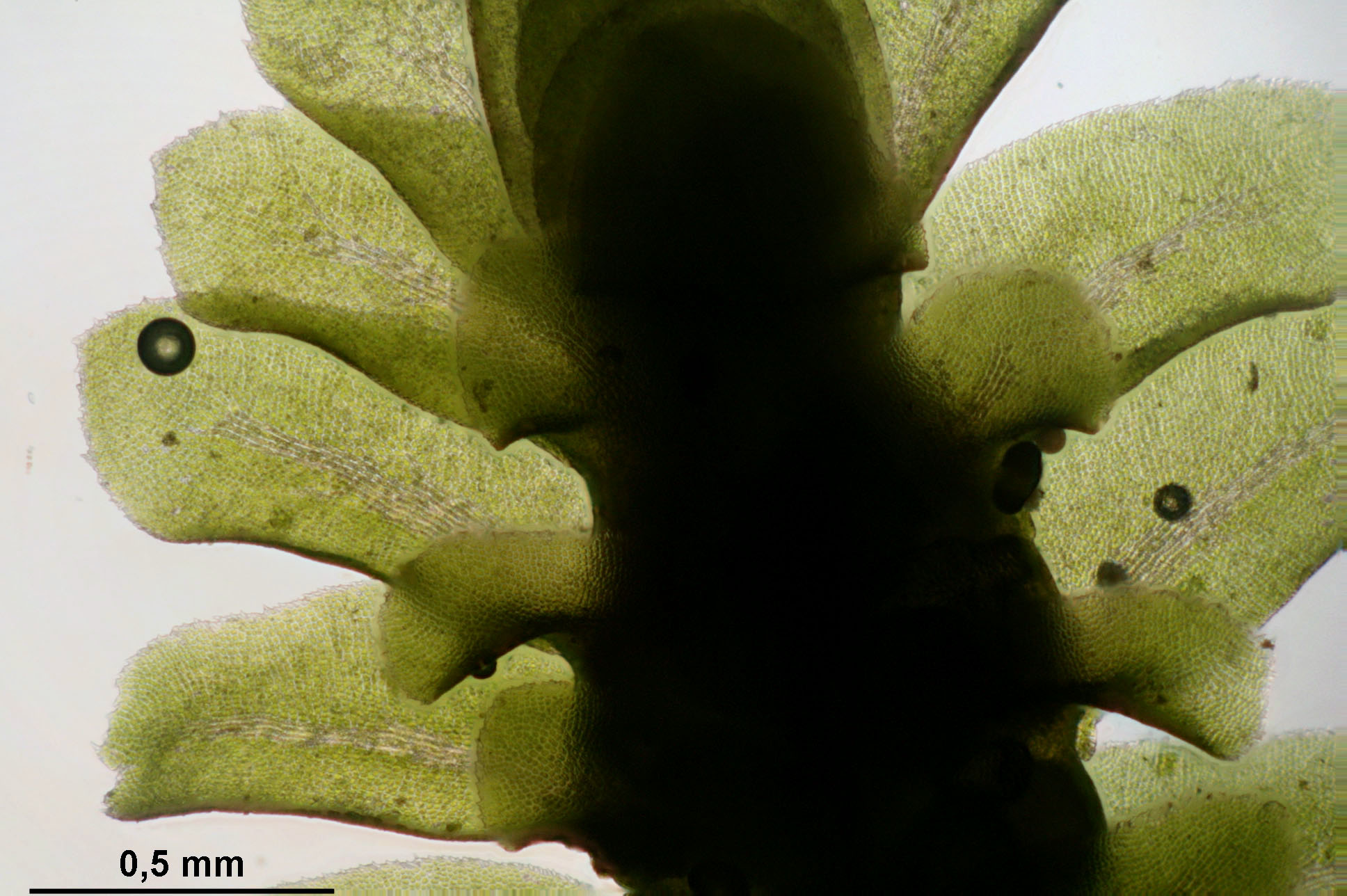

Scientific classification
- Kingdom: Plantae
- Division: Marchantiophyta
- Class: Jungermanniopsida
- Order: Lophoziales
- Family: Scapaniaceae
- Genus: Diplophyllum
- Species: D. albicans

Binomial name
- Diplophyllum albicans (L.) Dumort.

= Diplophyllum albicans =

Species of liverwort

Diplophyllum albicans is a species of liverwort belonging to the family Scapaniaceae.

It is native to Eurasia and Northern America.
