= William Mitten =

British botanist (1819–1906)

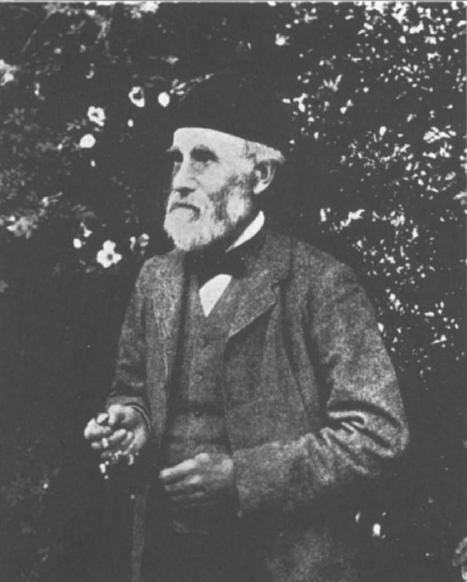
William Mitten in 1907

William Mitten (30 November 1819 – 20 July 1906) was an English pharmaceutical chemist and authority on bryophytes who has been called "the premier bryologist of the second half of the nineteenth century".

He built up a collection of some 50,000 specimens of bryophytes (mosses, lichens and liverworts) at his birthplace and home in Hurstpierpoint, Sussex. The collection was largely made up of specimens collected around the world by other collectors and is now at the New York Botanical Garden, having been purchased after his death. These collectors included Richard Spruce and also Alfred Russel Wallace, who became Mitten's son-in-law in 1866.

Mitten had four daughters. Annie, the eldest, was the only one to marry. Flora provided assistance in compiling notes for William Edward Nicholson to write a sketch with bibliography on her father.

== Sources ==
- Lawley, Mark. "William Mitten (1819-1906)" (PDF). British Bryological Society.
- Scott, Brad (2019). "William Mitten, Hurstpierpoint and the bryophytes of the world" (PDF). Field Bryology. 122. British Bryological Society: 27-34.
