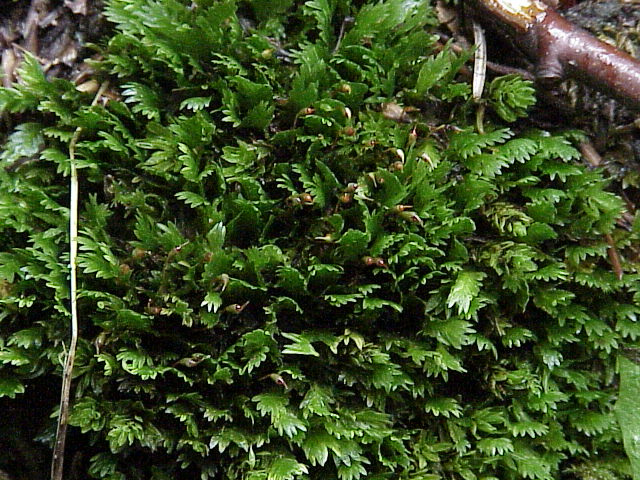
- Fissidens dubius

Scientific classification
- Kingdom: Plantae
- Division: Bryophyta
- Class: Bryopsida
- Subclass: Dicranidae
- Order: Dicranales
- Family: Fissidentaceae; Schimp.

Genera
- Fissidens Hedw.

Synonyms
- Schistophyllaceae Lindb.; Nanobryaceae W.Schultze-Motel

= Fissidentaceae =

Family of haplolepideous mosses

Fissidentaceae is a family of haplolepideous mosses (Dicranidae) in the order Dicranales, with a single genus, Fissidens. It was formerly placed in the now-obsolete order Fissidentales.
