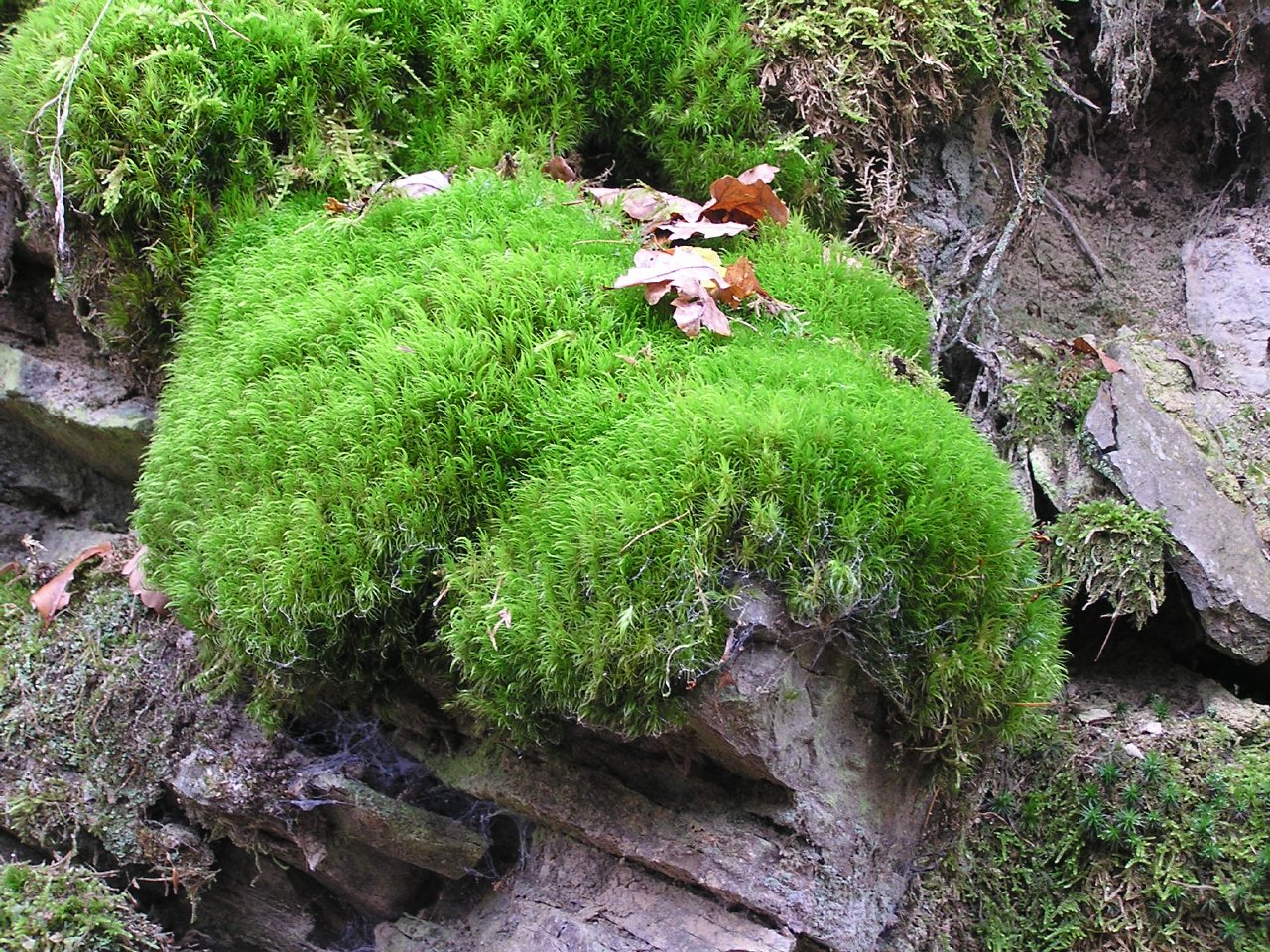
- Dicranum scoparium

Scientific classification
- Kingdom: Plantae
- Division: Bryophyta
- Class: Bryopsida
- Subclass: Dicranidae
- Order: Dicranales; H. Philib. ex M. Fleisch.

Families
- Fissidentaceae; Hypodontiaceae; Eustichiaceae; Ditrichaceae; Bruchiaceae; Rhachitheciaceae; Erpodiaceae; Schistostegaceae; Viridivelleraceae; Hymenolomataceae; Rhabdoweisiaceae; Dicranaceae; Rhizogemmaceae; Ruficaulaceae; Aongstroemiaceae; Dicranellaceae; Micromitriaceae; Leucobryaceae; Octoblepharaceae; Calymperaceae

= Dicranales =

Order of haplolepideous mosses

Dicranales is an order of haplolepidous mosses in the subclass Dicranidae.
