= Hymenostylium gracillimum =

Conservation status
- Endangered (IUCN 3.1)

Scientific classification
- Kingdom: Plantae
- Division: Bryophyta
- Class: Bryopsida
- Subclass: Dicranidae
- Order: Pottiales
- Family: Pottiaceae
- Genus: Hymenostylium
- Species: H. gracillimum

Binomial name
- Hymenostylium gracillimum (Nees & Hornsch.) Köckinger & J.Kučera

Synonyms
- Gymnostomum gracillimum Nees & Hornsch; Gymnostomum calcareum var. gracillimum (Nees & Hornsch.) Bruch & Schimp.; Weissia calcarea var. gracillima (Nees & Hornsch.) Müll.Hal.; Trichostomum calcareum var. gracillimum (Nees & Hornsch.) Lindb.; Mollia calcarea var. gracillima (Nees & Hornsch.) Lindb.; Gymnostomum calcareum var. gracile Breidl. ex G. Roth; Gymnostomum calcareum f. gracile (Breidl. ex G. Roth) Podp.; Gymnostomum boreale Nyholm & Hedenäs; Ardeuma gracillimum (Nees & Hornsch.) R.H. Zander

Species of moss

Hymenostylium gracillimum is a species of moss in the family Pottiaceae. It is an endangered species found in Austria and Russia.

== Taxonomy and history ==
Gymnostomum gracillimum was described by German botanist Christian Gottfried Daniel Nees von Esenbeck and colleagues in 1823 based on a population growing on a slate rock wall near Hüttau in Salzburg, Austria. In 1846 G. gracillimum was designated a variety of Gymnostomum calcareum by Philipp Bruch and colleagues. Gymnostomum calcareum var. gracile was described by Georg Roth in 1903 based on a specimen collected from Radstädter Tauern Pass, also in Salzburg, Austria. In 1986 Elsa Nyholm and Lars Hedenäs described Gymnostomum boreale from Karelia. These names would all be reduced to synonymy with Hymenostylium gracillimum by Heribert Köckinger and Jan Kučera in 2011.

== Distribution and habitat ==
H. gracillimum is known from eight localities: seven in the Austrian Alps and one in Russian Karelia. In Austria, it can be found at elevations of 500–1,300 m (1,600–4,300 ft) above sea level. It grows on moist, shaded rocks, and appears to prefer slate, phyllite and schist substrates.
