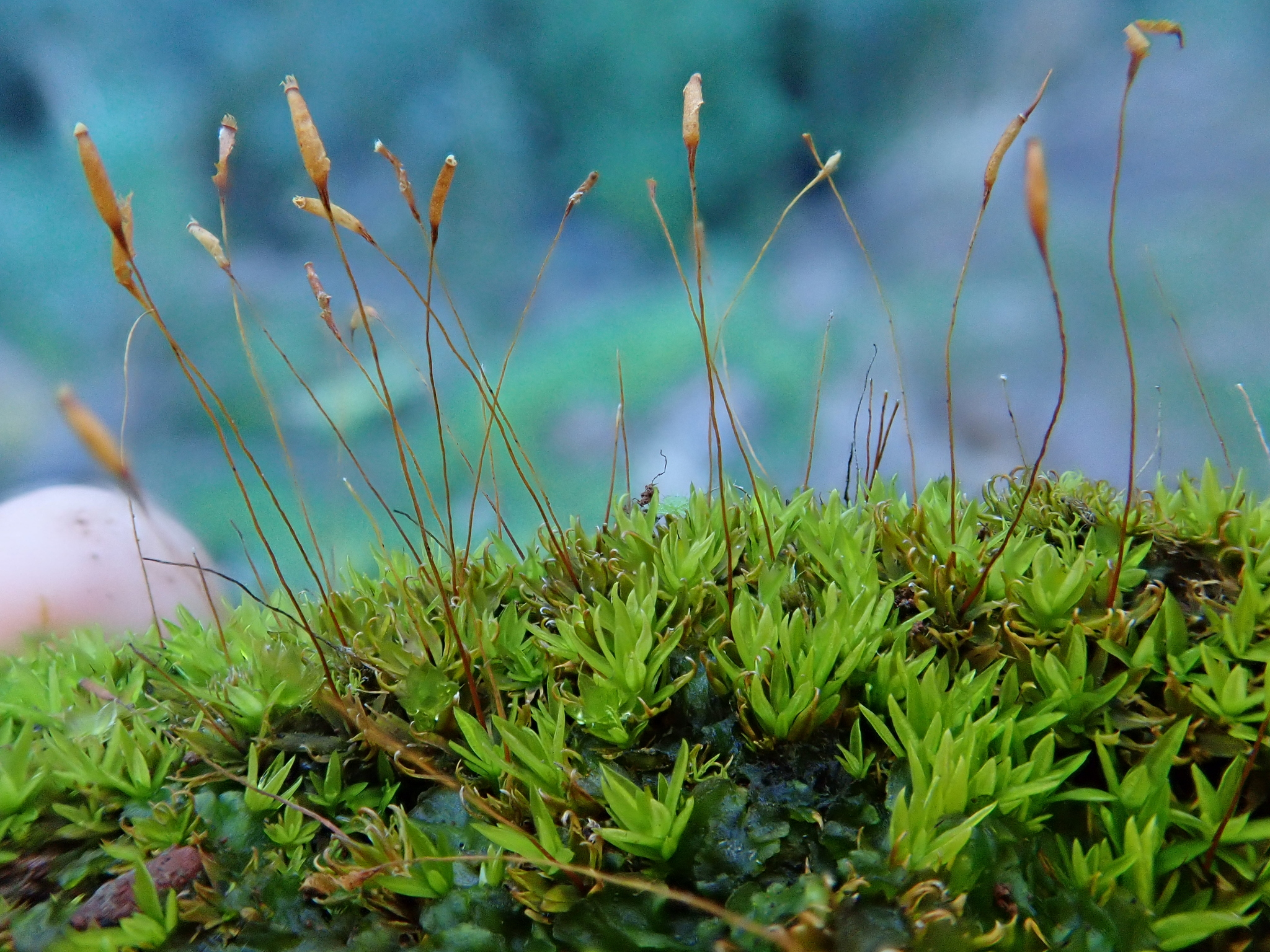
- Timmiella barbuloides

Scientific classification
- Kingdom: Plantae
- Division: Bryophyta
- Class: Bryopsida
- Subclass: Dicranidae
- Order: Distichiales
- Family: Timmiellaceae
- Genus: Timmiella (De Not.) Limpr.

= Timmiella =

Genus of mosses

Timmiella is a genus of mosses in the family Timmiellaceae. The genus has an almost cosmopolitan distribution.

The genus was previously classified in the family Pottiaceae until molecular phylogenetic analysis was completed in 2014.

== Species ==
The following species are recognised in the genus Timmiella:

- Timmiella acaulon (Müll.Hal.) R.H.Zander
- Timmiella anomala (Bruch & Schimp.) Limpr.
- Timmiella barbuloides (Brid.) Mönk.
- Timmiella brevidens Dixon
- Timmiella cameruniae Broth.
- Timmiella corniculata (Wahlenb.) Broth.
- Timmiella crassinervis (Hampe) L.F.Koch
- Timmiella diminuta (Müll.Hal.) P.C.Chen
- Timmiella flexiseta (Bruch) Limpr.
- Timmiella pelindaba Magill
- Timmiella subintegra Dixon
- Timmiella umbrosa (Müll.Hal.) Broth.
