= Aschisma kansanum =

Conservation status
- Vulnerable (IUCN 2.3)

- Critically Imperiled (NatureServe)

Scientific classification
- Kingdom: Plantae
- Division: Bryophyta
- Class: Bryopsida
- Subclass: Dicranidae
- Order: Pottiales
- Family: Pottiaceae
- Genus: Aschisma
- Species: A. kansanum

Binomial name
- Aschisma kansanum A.L.Andrews

Species of moss

Aschisma kansanum is a species of moss in the family Pottiaceae. It is endemic to the United States. Its natural habitat is temperate grassland. It is threatened by habitat loss.
