= Leptodontium interruptum =

Scientific classification
- Kingdom: Plantae
- Clade: Embryophytes
- Division: Bryophyta
- Class: Bryopsida
- Subclass: Dicranidae
- Order: Pottiales
- Family: Pottiaceae
- Genus: Leptodontium
- Species: L. interruptum

Binomial name
- Leptodontium interruptum (Mitt.) Broth.

Synonyms
- Austroleptodontium interruptum (Mitt.) R.H.Zander; Didymodon interruptus Mitt.; Trichostomum interruptum (Mitt.) Besch.

Species of bryophyte

Leptodontium interruptum is a species of moss in the family Pottiaceae.

== Description ==
The overall form of the moss Leptodontium interruptum is 2–5 cm (0.8–2.0 in) tall with simply/branched stems with comal tufts, loosely tufted. The species has a yellow to yellow-green appearance with a brown color towards the base, although it can look green when in shade.

It has 6 cm (2.4 in) stems, which can be simple, but can also be infrequently and irregularly branched. Leaves are keeled, broad, and have an ovate base. When moist, leaves twist around the stem and are strongly squarrose, which means "having its parts or processes (such as the tips of phyllaries) spreading or recurved at the end". When dry, apices spread and are loosely appressed. Apices are plural for apex and refer to the point furthest away from the point of attachment, i.e., the tip.

Capsules, located at the end of setae, are pale brown, erect, narrowly elliptic, and 1–1.5 mm (0.04–0.06 in) in length. The setae are yellow, 8–10 mm (0.31–0.39 in), and flexuous, meaning with curves or bends. The operculum is subulate with 16 irregularly cleft teeth. The most recognizable characteristics for distinguishing this species from others are its undulate leaf margins and the presence of serrated leaf edges.

== Distribution and habitat ==
=== Natural global range ===
While Leptodontium interruptum is endemic to New Zealand, the genus Leptodontium can be found across the world with a wide distribution in the subtropics and tropics, often found in mountainous areas.

=== New Zealand range ===
Indicative database records show that this species can be found in the following Land Districts of New Zealand: Hawke's Bay, Marlborough, Nelson, North Auckland, Otago, South Auckland, Southland, Wellington, and Westland. The majority of these collections are from Aukland and Wellington.

=== Habitat preferences ===
Leptodontium interruptum can be found on multiple substrates. The main habitat consists of exposed soil or rock, tending to be at higher elevations. It can also be found covering several meters in shrublands with dominant species such as Kunzea ericoides and Leptospermum scoparium shrubland.

== Ecology ==
=== Environmental conditions ===
Species of Leptodontium have been found in various environmental conditions, such as tropical volcanoes and misty spruce-fir forests. L. interruptum follows this pattern; records range from areas near sea level to levels near 900 m (3,000 ft). It is categorized as a terrestrial plant usually growing in exposed sites on soil, sand, or rock; it can even grow in highly modified sites such as gravel, near roads

=== Predators, parasites, and diseases ===
There is no clear evidence that L. interruptum has specific predators, diseases, or parasites. In fact, mosses are generally not eaten by animals. A possible reason for the lack of herbivore activity is due to New Zealand existing in a temperate climate. Tropical or temperate herbivores tend to not graze moss; instead, it has been observed that animals living in permanently cold climates eat moss

== Identification issues ==
Triquetrella papillata, which often grows with L. interruptum, and Gertrudiella torquata have been confused for Leptodontium interruptum. T. papillata has more rope-like slender shoots and no teeth. G. torquata has erect spreading leaves when moist, instead of L. interruptum's squarrose leaves.

There is one possible record of L. interruptum from Amsterdam; however, the specimen has not been seen again, and the species is still categorized as being endemic to New Zealand.
