= Chenia =

Chenia may refer to:

- Chenia (worm), a worm genus in the family Derogenidae
- Chenia (plant), a moss genus in the family Pottiaceae
