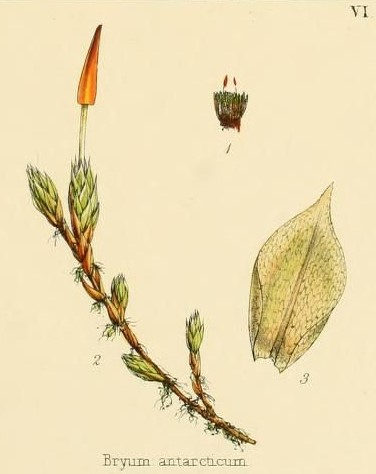
- Hennediella heimii (syn. Bryum antarcticum) in Flora Antarctica

Scientific classification
- Kingdom: Plantae
- Division: Bryophyta
- Class: Bryopsida
- Subclass: Dicranidae
- Order: Pottiales
- Family: Pottiaceae
- Genus: Hennediella
- Species: H. heimii

Binomial name
- Hennediella heimii (Hedw.) R.H.Zander

Synonyms
- Gymnostomum heimii Hedw.; Desmatodon heimii (Hedw.) Mitt.; Pottia heimii (Hedw.) Hampe, 1837; Bryum antarcticum Hook. F. et Wils.; Pottia charcotii Card.; Pottia heimii var. brevirostris L. I. Savicz & Smirnova

= Hennediella heimii =

Species of moss

Hennediella heimii, also known as Heim's pottia, is a moss with 2.5 mm brown or yellow-green tufts.

== Habitat and distribution ==
Hennediella heimii is found in saline environments such as coastal salt marshes, and in recent times on the verges of roads salted to prevent icing.
