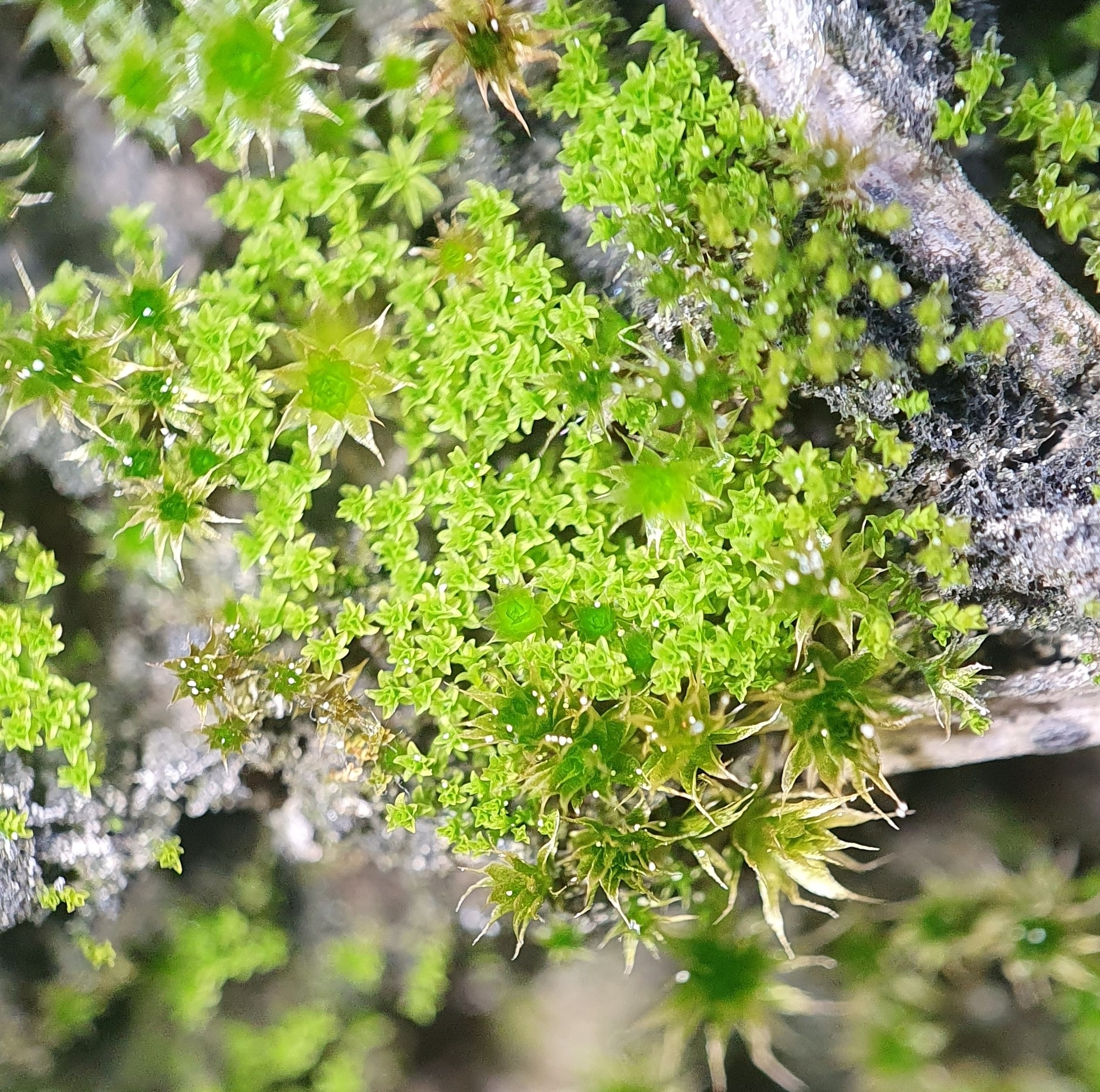

Scientific classification
- Kingdom: Plantae
- Division: Bryophyta
- Class: Bryopsida
- Subclass: Dicranidae
- Order: Pottiales
- Family: Pottiaceae
- Genus: Gymnostomum
- Species: G. viridulum

Binomial name
- Gymnostomum viridulum Brid.

= Gymnostomum viridulum =

Species of moss

Gymnostomum viridulum is a species of moss in the family Pottiaceae. It has an almost cosmopolitan distribution.
