= Didymodon tophaceus =

Scientific classification
- Kingdom: Plantae
- Division: Bryophyta
- Class: Bryopsida
- Subclass: Dicranidae
- Order: Pottiales
- Family: Pottiaceae
- Genus: Didymodon
- Species: D. tophaceus

Binomial name
- Didymodon tophaceus Lisa, 1837

Species of moss

Didymodon tophaceus is a species of moss belonging to the family Pottiaceae.

It has cosmopolitan distribution.
