= Gertrudiella gelida =

Scientific classification
- Kingdom: Plantae
- Division: Bryophyta
- Class: Bryopsida
- Subclass: Dicranidae
- Order: Pottiales
- Family: Pottiaceae
- Genus: Gertrudiella
- Species: G. gelida

Binomial name
- Gertrudiella gelida (Cardot) J.A. Jiménez & M.J. Cano

Species of moss

Gertrudiella gelida is a species of mosses that grows in Antarctica and on the South Shetland Islands.
