= Didymodon mamillosus =

Perthshire beardmoss

Scientific classification
- Kingdom: Plantae
- Division: Bryophyta
- Class: Bryopsida
- Subclass: Dicranidae
- Order: Pottiales
- Family: Pottiaceae
- Genus: Didymodon
- Species: D. mamillosus

Binomial name
- Didymodon mamillosus (Crundw.) M.O.Hill

Species of moss

Didymodon mamillosus, commonly known as Perthshire beardmoss, is a species of moss endemic to Europe. It occurs at only five sites including one in Scotland where it is classified as "Critically Endangered". The other sites are in Iceland, Germany, the Czech Republic and in north-east Spain.

Named as a new species by Alan Crundwell in 1967, the Scottish site at Kirkton Glen in Perthshire was found again in 1998 by Nick Hodgetts. Jan Kucera, working in Bohemia considers it to be a form of D. rigidulus.
