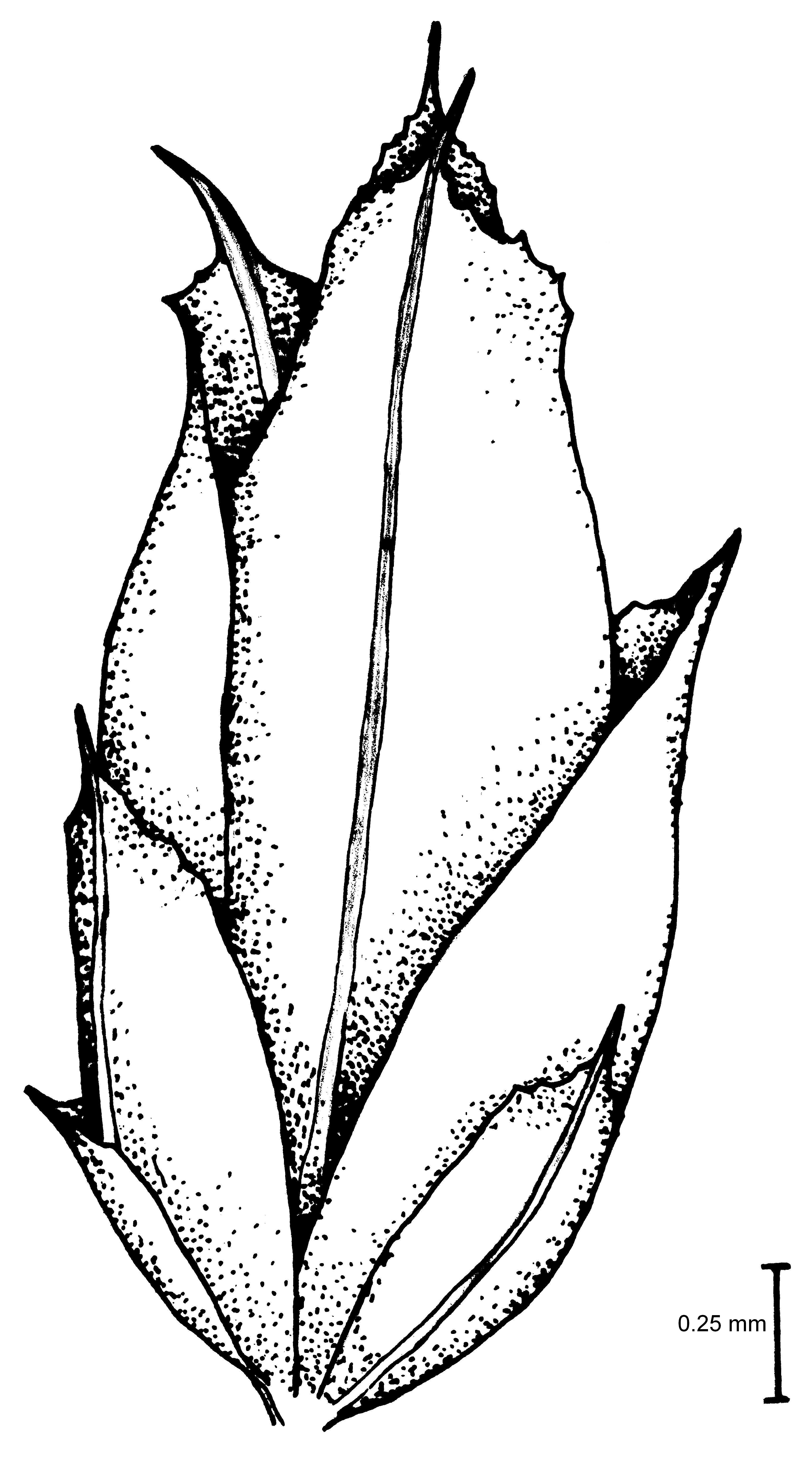
- Acaulon muticum Skala 1200

Scientific classification
- Kingdom: Plantae
- Division: Bryophyta
- Class: Bryopsida
- Subclass: Dicranidae
- Order: Pottiales
- Family: Pottiaceae
- Genus: Acaulon
- Species: A. muticum

Binomial name
- Acaulon muticum (Schreb. ex Hedw.) Müll. Hal.

= Acaulon muticum =

Species of moss

Acaulon muticum is a species of moss belonging to the family Pottiaceae.

It is native to Europe and Northern America.
