= Bryoerythrophyllum caledonicum =

Scottish beard-moss

Conservation status
- Vulnerable (IUCN 3.1)

Scientific classification
- Kingdom: Plantae
- Division: Bryophyta
- Class: Bryopsida
- Subclass: Dicranidae
- Order: Pottiales
- Family: Pottiaceae
- Genus: Bryoerythrophyllum
- Species: B. caledonicum

Binomial name
- Bryoerythrophyllum caledonicum D. G. Long

Species of moss

Bryoerythrophyllum caledonicum, commonly known as Scottish beardmoss, is a moss endemic to Scotland. Recognised as a distinct species in 1982, it had been collected occasionally from 1891 onwards under other names. The largest populations are in the Breadalbane mountains including Ben Lawers with smaller populations in mainland Lochaber and on the islands of Skye and Rùm. It has a very restricted habitat, growing only on damp montane schist or basalt ledges. The species has been provisionally classified as Low Risk (Near threatened) and receives protection under the Wildlife and Countryside Act 1981.
