= Microbryum davallianum =

Scientific classification
- Kingdom: Plantae
- Division: Bryophyta
- Class: Bryopsida
- Subclass: Dicranidae
- Order: Pottiales
- Family: Pottiaceae
- Genus: Microbryum
- Species: M. davallianum

Binomial name
- Microbryum davallianum (Sm.) R.H.Zander

Species of moss

Microbryum davallianum is a species of moss belonging to the family Pottiaceae.

It is native to Europe and Northern America.

Synonym:

- Pottia davalliana (Sm.) C.E.O.Jensen
