= Aschisma =

Scientific classification
- Kingdom: Plantae
- Division: Bryophyta
- Class: Bryopsida
- Subclass: Dicranidae
- Order: Pottiales
- Family: Pottiaceae
- Genus: Aschisma; Lindb.

Species
- See text.

Genus of mosses

Aschisma is a genus of moss in family Pottiaceae.

There are three species in this genus:

- Aschisma carniolicum (F.Weber & D.Mohr) Lindb.
- Aschisma cuynetii (Bizot & R.B.Pierrot) J.Guerra & M.J.Cano
- Aschisma kansanum A.L. Andrews
