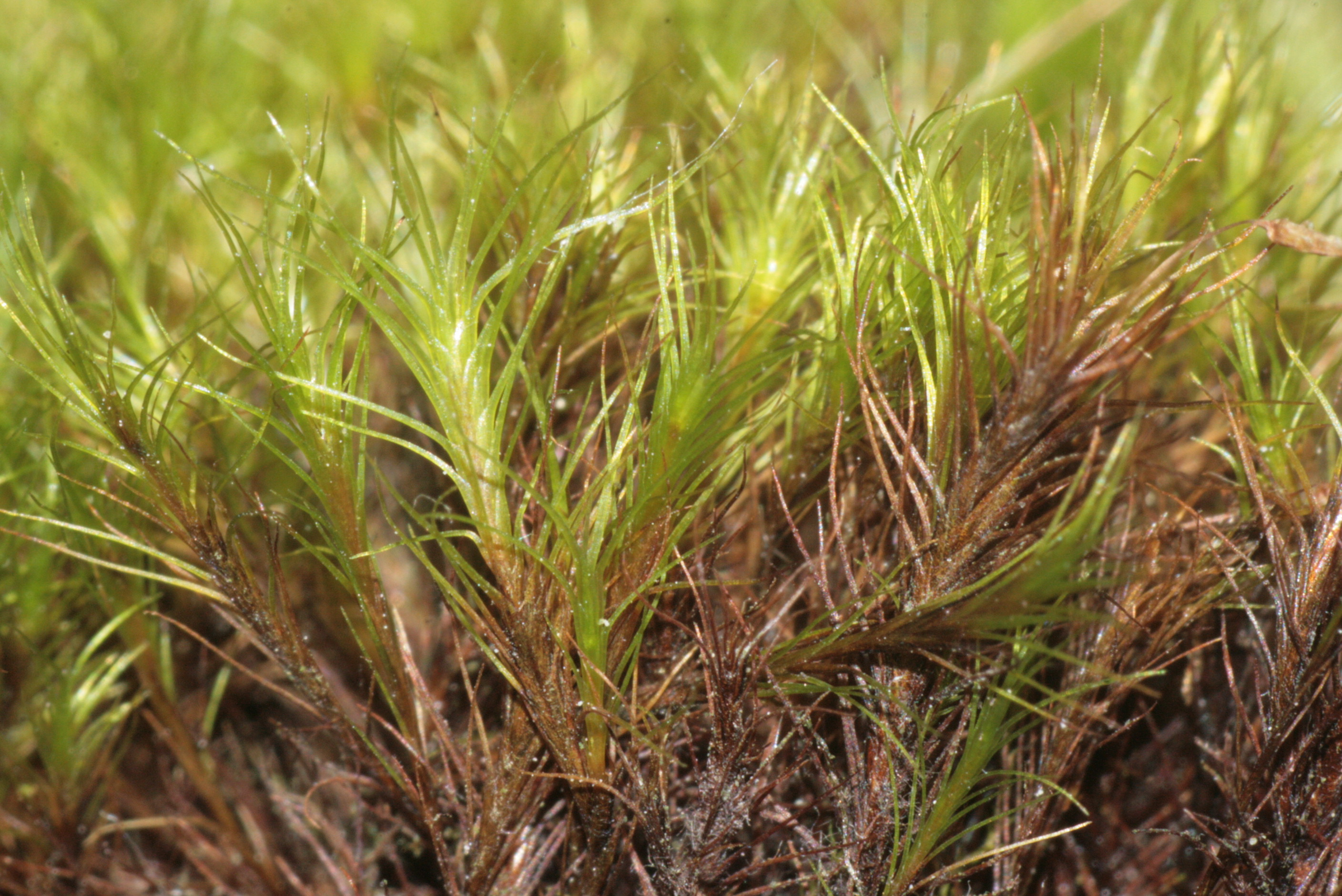

Scientific classification
- Kingdom: Plantae
- Division: Bryophyta
- Class: Bryopsida
- Subclass: Dicranidae
- Order: Distichiales
- Family: Distichiaceae
- Genus: Distichium
- Species: D. capillaceum

Binomial name
- Distichium capillaceum Bruch & W.P.Schimper, 1846

= Distichium capillaceum =

Species of moss

Distichium capillaceum is a species of moss belonging to the family Ditrichaceae.

It has cosmopolitan distribution.
