= Molendoa ogalalensis =

Conservation status
- Critically Endangered (IUCN 2.3)

Scientific classification
- Kingdom: Plantae
- Division: Bryophyta
- Class: Bryopsida
- Subclass: Dicranidae
- Order: Pottiales
- Family: Pottiaceae
- Genus: Molendoa
- Species: M. ogalalensis

Binomial name
- Molendoa ogalalensis (G.L. Merr.) R.H. Zander

Synonyms
- Ozobryum ogalalense G.L. Smith

Species of moss

Molendoa ogalalensis is a species of moss belonging to the Pottiaceae family. It is endemic to the United States. Its natural habitat is temperate grassland. It is threatened by habitat loss.
