= Gyroweisia tenuis =

Conservation status
- Least Concern (IUCN 3.1)

Scientific classification
- Kingdom: Plantae
- Division: Bryophyta
- Class: Bryopsida
- Subclass: Dicranidae
- Order: Pottiales
- Family: Pottiaceae
- Genus: Gyroweisia
- Species: G. tenuis

Binomial name
- Gyroweisia tenuis W.P.Schimper, 1876

Species of moss

Gyroweisia tenuis, the Slender Stubble-moss, is a species of moss belonging to the family Pottiaceae.

It has almost cosmopolitan distribution.

Although worldwide G. tenuis is classified as a species of least concern with a stable population trend, in Iceland, it is found at only one location and has the conservation status of a vulnerable species (VU).
