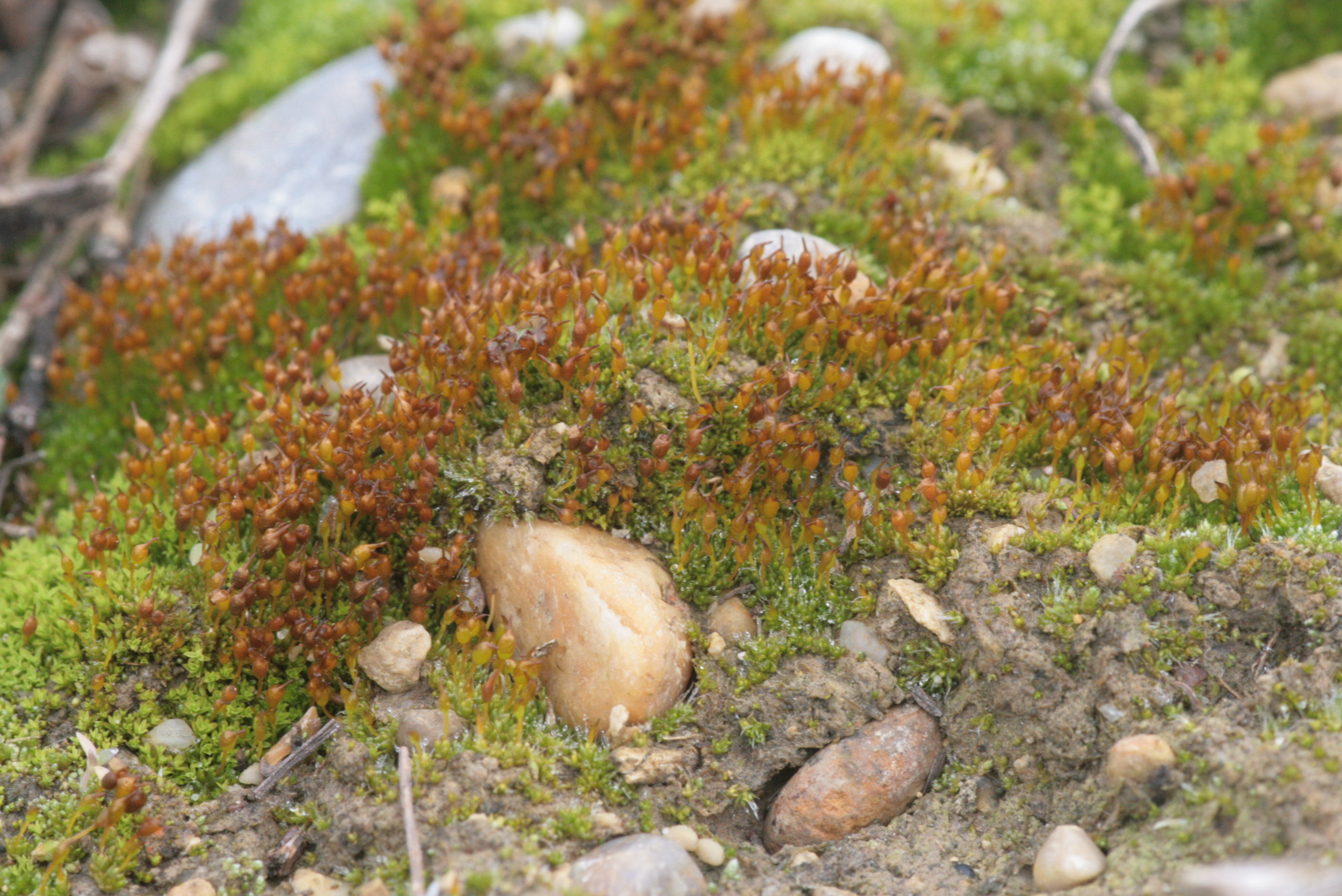

Scientific classification
- Kingdom: Plantae
- Division: Bryophyta
- Class: Bryopsida
- Subclass: Dicranidae
- Order: Pottiales
- Family: Pottiaceae
- Genus: Pterygoneurum
- Species: P. ovatum

Binomial name
- Pterygoneurum ovatum Dixon, 1934

= Pterygoneurum ovatum =

Species of moss

Pterygoneurum ovatum is a species of moss belonging to the family Pottiaceae.

It has cosmopolitan distribution.
