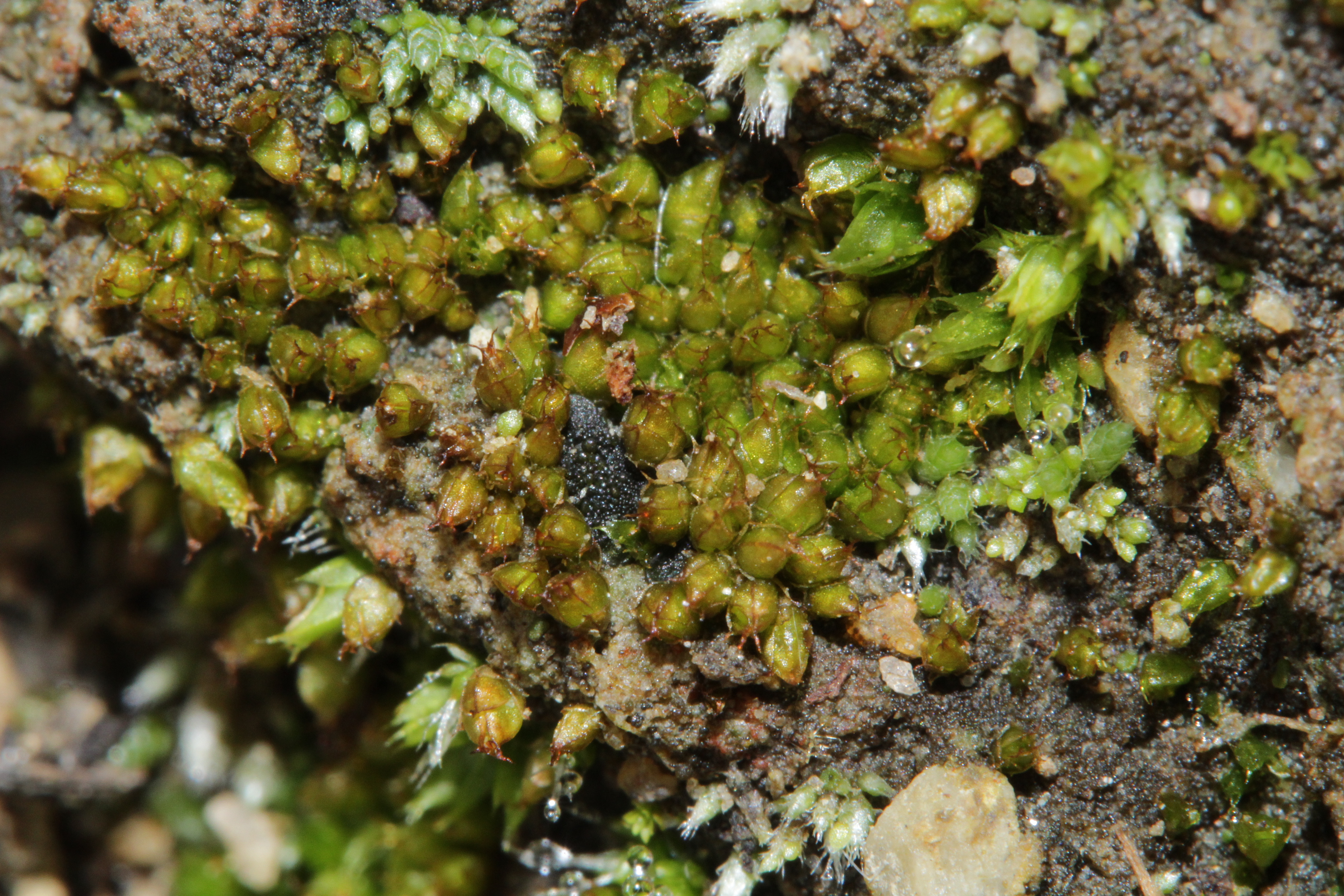
- Acaulon triquetrum

Scientific classification
- Kingdom: Plantae
- Division: Bryophyta
- Class: Bryopsida
- Subclass: Dicranidae
- Order: Pottiales
- Family: Pottiaceae
- Genus: Acaulon; Müll.Hal.

= Acaulon =

Genus of mosses

Acaulon is a genus of mosses in the family Pottiaceae.

== Species ==
The following species are recognised in the genus Acaulon:

- Acaulon anomalum R.H. Zander, G.M. Suárez & M.S. Jimenez
- Acaulon casasianum Brugués & H.A. Crum
- Acaulon chrysacanthum I.G. Stone
- Acaulon crassinervium Müll. Hal.
- Acaulon dertosense Casas, Sérgio, Cros & Brugués
- Acaulon eremicola I.G. Stone
- Acaulon fontiquerianum Casas & Sérgio
- Acaulon granulosum I.G. Stone
- Acaulon integrifolium Müll. Hal.
- Acaulon leucochaete I.G. Stone
- Acaulon mediterraneum Limpr.
- Acaulon muticum (Schreb. ex Hedw.) Müll. Hal.
- Acaulon nanum Müll. Hal.
- Acaulon piligerum (De Not.) Limpr.
- Acaulon recurvatum Magill
- Acaulon robustum Broth. ex G. Roth
- Acaulon schimperianum (Sull.) Sull.
- Acaulon sphaericum J. Shaw
- Acaulon triquetrum (Spruce) Müll. Hal.
- Acaulon uleanum Müll. Hal.
- Acaulon vesiculosum Müll. Hal.
