= Didymodon tomaculosus =

Scientific classification
- Kingdom: Plantae
- Division: Bryophyta
- Class: Bryopsida
- Subclass: Dicranidae
- Order: Pottiales
- Family: Pottiaceae
- Genus: Didymodon
- Species: D. tomaculosus

Binomial name
- Didymodon tomaculosus (Blockeel) Corley

Species of moss

Didymodon tomaculosus, the sausage beardmoss, is a rare moss in the United Kingdom which has been noted as an important species in Natural England's Farm Environmental Plan book, part of the Environmental Stewardship Scheme.
