= Sarconeurum glaciale =

Scientific classification
- Kingdom: Plantae
- Division: Bryophyta
- Class: Bryopsida
- Subclass: Dicranidae
- Order: Pottiales
- Family: Pottiaceae
- Genus: Sarconeurum
- Species: S. glaciale

Binomial name
- Sarconeurum glaciale (C.Bryhn.) Card. et Bryhn

Species of moss

Sarconeurum glaciale is a species of moss in Antarctica. It lives in Ross Island and Southern Victoria Land in Antarctica, and on Tierra del Fuego.
