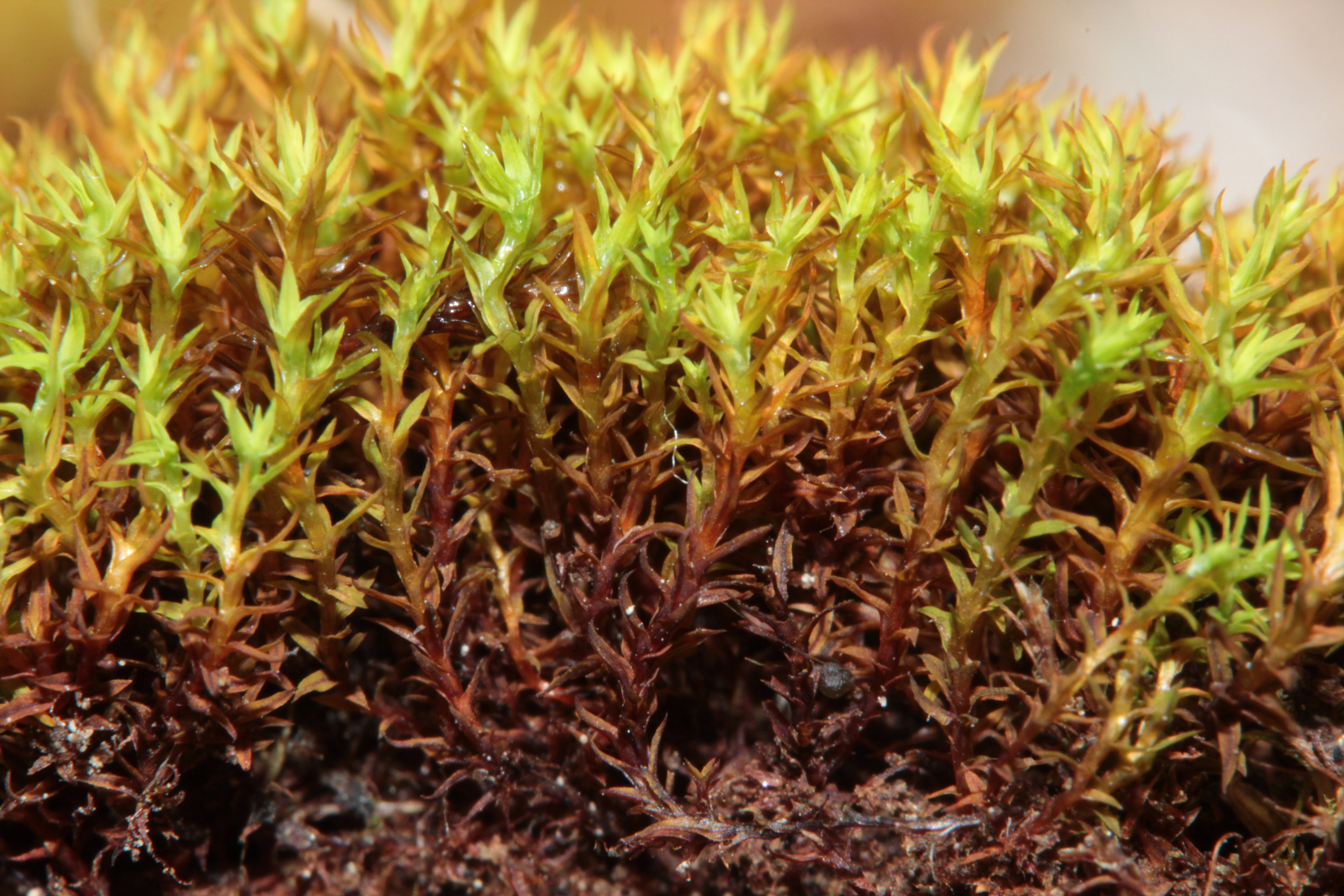
- Bryoerythrophyllum ferruginascens

Scientific classification
- Kingdom: Plantae
- Division: Bryophyta
- Class: Bryopsida
- Subclass: Dicranidae
- Order: Pottiales
- Family: Pottiaceae
- Genus: Bryoerythrophyllum; Chen

= Bryoerythrophyllum =

Genus of mosses

Bryoerythrophyllum is a genus of mosses belonging to the family Pottiaceae. It was first described by Pan Chieh Chen and has a cosmopolitan distribution.

== Species ==
The following species are recognised in the genus Bryoerythrophyllum:

- Bryoerythrophyllum aeneum (Müll.Hal.) B.H.Allen
- Bryoerythrophyllum alpigenum (Vent.) P.C.Chen
- Bryoerythrophyllum alpigenum Chen Pan-chieh, 1941
- Bryoerythrophyllum andersonianum Zander & A.J.Sharp, 1981
- Bryoerythrophyllum angustulum (Herzog) H.Rob.
- Bryoerythrophyllum atrorubens (Besch.) P.C.Chen
- Bryoerythrophyllum barbuloides (Herzog) Wijk & Margad.
- Bryoerythrophyllum berthoanum (Thér.) J.A.Jiménez
- Bryoerythrophyllum binnsii Wijk & Margadant, 1959
- Bryoerythrophyllum bolivianum Zander, 1978
- Bryoerythrophyllum brachystegium K.Saito, 1972
- Bryoerythrophyllum byrdii (E.B.Bartram) R.H.Zander
- Bryoerythrophyllum calcareum Zander, 1980
- Bryoerythrophyllum caledonicum D.G.Long, 1982
- Bryoerythrophyllum campylocarpum H.Crum, 1957
- Bryoerythrophyllum chimborazense Zander, 1993
- Bryoerythrophyllum columbianum Zander, 1978
- Bryoerythrophyllum compactum J.Fröhlich, 1964
- Bryoerythrophyllum dentatum (Mitt.) P.C.Chen
- Bryoerythrophyllum duellii Blockeel
- Bryoerythrophyllum ferruginascens Giacomini, 1947
- Bryoerythrophyllum fuscinervium Zander, 1993
- Bryoerythrophyllum gymnostomum (Broth.) P.C.Chen
- Bryoerythrophyllum gymnostomum Chen Pan-chieh, 1941
- Bryoerythrophyllum hostile (Herzog) P.C.Chen
- Bryoerythrophyllum hostile Chen Pan-chieh, 1941
- Bryoerythrophyllum inaequalifolium Zander, 1980
- Bryoerythrophyllum jamesonii H.Crum, 1957
- Bryoerythrophyllum latinervium (Holmen) Fedosov & Ignatova
- Bryoerythrophyllum ligulare Zander, 1993
- Bryoerythrophyllum linearifolium K.Saito
- Bryoerythrophyllum lusitanicum (Cardot & Dixon) M.O.Hill
- Bryoerythrophyllum machadoanum M.O.Hill, 1981
- Bryoerythrophyllum noguchianum K.Saito, 1975
- Bryoerythrophyllum obtusissimum (Broth.) P.C.Chen
- Bryoerythrophyllum recurvirostrum (Hedw.) P.C.Chen
- Bryoerythrophyllum recurvirostrum Chen Pan-chieh, 1941
- Bryoerythrophyllum rotundatum (Lindb. & Arnell) P.C.Chen
- Bryoerythrophyllum rotundatum Chen Pan-chieh, 1941
- Bryoerythrophyllum rubrum (Jur. ex Geh.) P.C.Chen
- Bryoerythrophyllum rubrum Chen Pan-chieh, 1941
- Bryoerythrophyllum sharpii Zander, 1986
- Bryoerythrophyllum subcaespitosum (J.A.Jimenez & M.J.Cano, 2012) J.A.Jimenez & M.J.Cano, 2012
- Bryoerythrophyllum wallichii (Mitt.) P.C.Chen
- Bryoerythrophyllum wallichii Chen Pan-chieh, 1941
- Bryoerythrophyllum yunnanense Chen Pan-chieh, 1941
