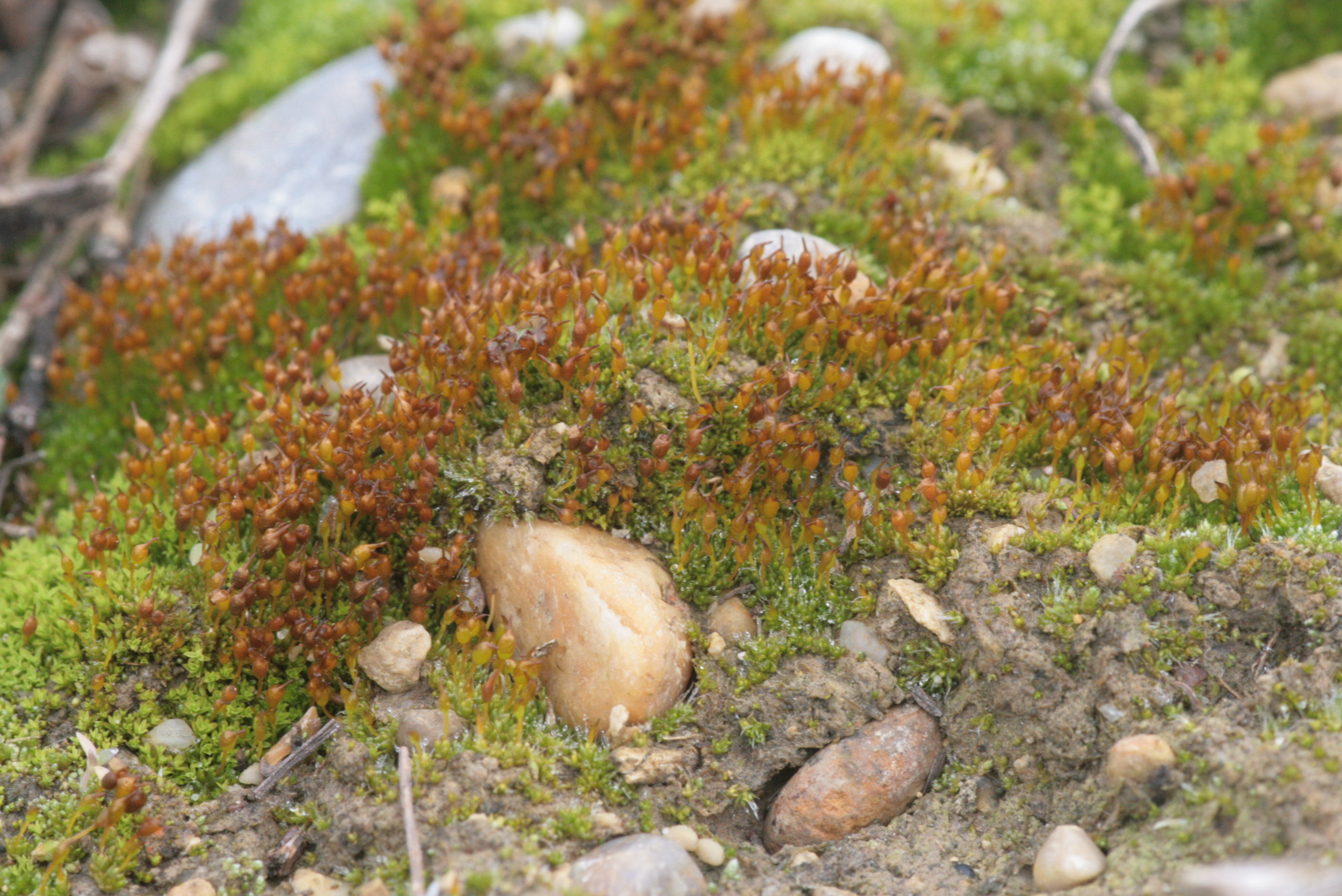
- Pterygoneurum ovatum

Scientific classification
- Kingdom: Plantae
- Division: Bryophyta
- Class: Bryopsida
- Subclass: Dicranidae
- Order: Pottiales
- Family: Pottiaceae
- Genus: Pterygoneurum; Jur.

= Pterygoneurum =

Genus of mosses

Pterygoneurum is a genus of mosses belonging to the family Pottiaceae.

The genus has cosmopolitan distribution.

Species:

- Pterygoneurum californicum H.Crum, 1967
- Pterygoneurum chotticum Brotherus, 1902
- Pterygoneurum ovatum Dixon, 1934
