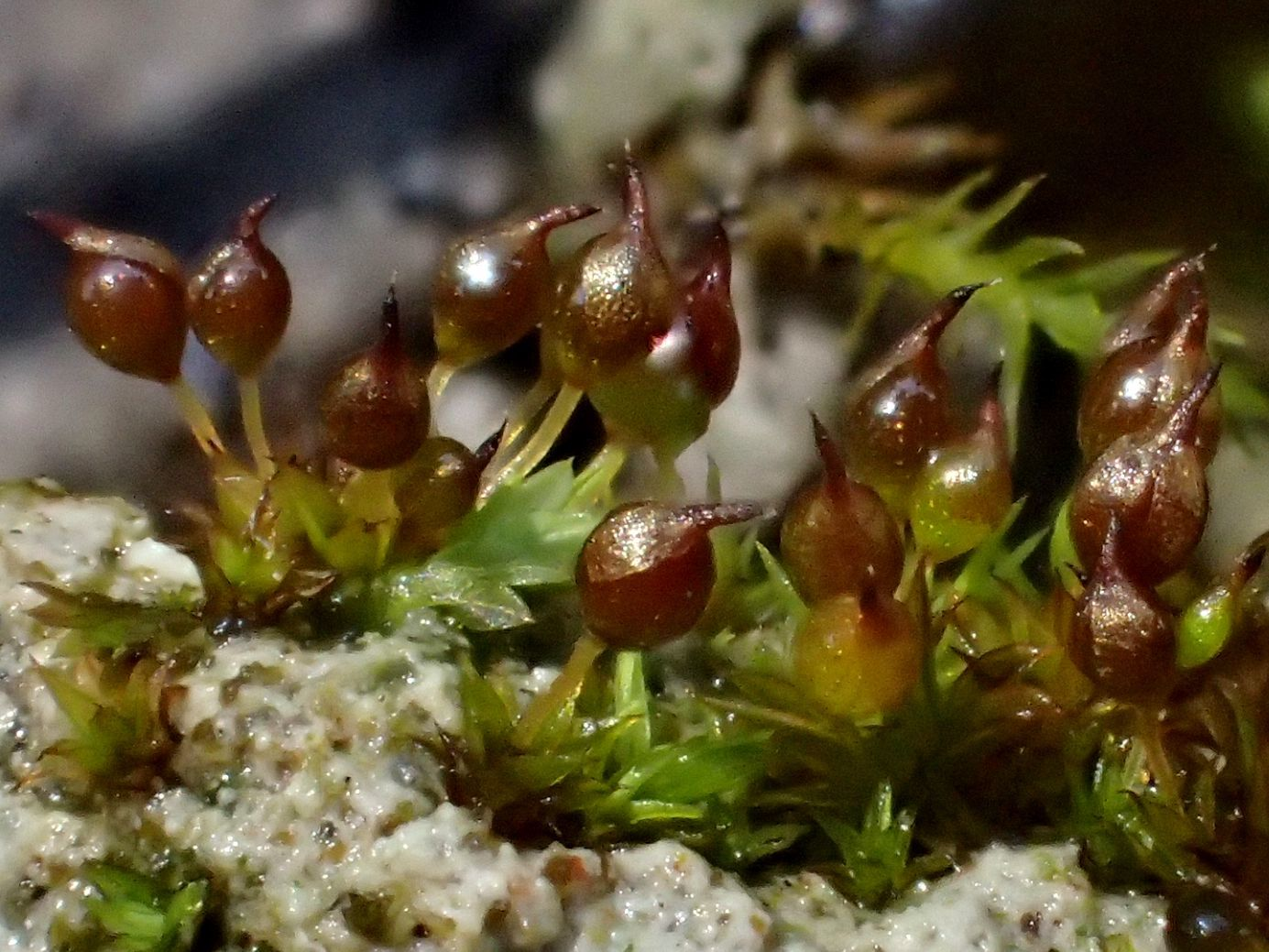
- Microbryum rectum

Scientific classification
- Kingdom: Plantae
- Division: Bryophyta
- Class: Bryopsida
- Subclass: Dicranidae
- Order: Pottiales
- Family: Pottiaceae
- Genus: Microbryum; Schimp.

= Microbryum =

Genus of mosses

Microbryum is a genus of mosses belonging to the family Pottiaceae. The genus has a cosmopolitan distribution.

== Species ==
The following species are recognised in the genus Microbryum:

- Microbryum brevicaule (Taylor) R.H.Zander
- Microbryum commutatum (Limpr.) Cl.Schneid., Th.Schneid. & Mahévas
- Microbryum conicum (Schleich. ex Schwägr.) Cl.Schneid., Th.Schneid. & Mahévas
- Microbryum curvicollum (Hedw.) R.H.Zander
- Microbryum davallianum (Sm.) R.H.Zander
- Microbryum floerkeanum (F.Weber & D.Mohr) Schimp.
- Microbryum fosbergii (E.B.Bartram) Ros, O.Werner & Rams
- Microbryum longipes (J.Guerra, J.J.Martínez & Ros) R.H.Zander
- Microbryum lydiae Otnyukova
- Microbryum muticum (Venturi) Cl.Schneid., Th.Schneid. & Mahévas
- Microbryum raddei (Broth.) R.H.Zander
- Microbryum rectum (With.) R.H.Zander
- Microbryum rufochaete (Magill) R.H.Zander
- Microbryum starckeanum (Hedw.) R.H.Zander
- Microbryum subplanomarginatum (Dixon) R.H.Zander
- Microbryum tasmanicum (Dixon & Rodway) R.H.Zander
- Microbryum vlassovii (Laz.) R.H.Zander
- Microbryum zealandiae (R.Br.bis) R.H.Zander
- SH1008215.09FU (Microbryum sp.)
- SH1009573.09FU (Microbryum sp.)
- SH1009580.09FU (Microbryum sp.)
- SH1009583.09FU (Microbryum sp.)
- SH1110404.09FU (Microbryum sp.)
- SH1110406.09FU (Microbryum sp.)
- SH1119448.09FU (Microbryum sp.)
- SH1119449.09FU (Microbryum sp.)
- SH1119451.09FU (Microbryum sp.)
- SH1119452.09FU (Microbryum sp.)
- SH1119454.09FU (Microbryum sp.)
- SH1119455.09FU (Microbryum sp.)
- SH1119461.09FU (Microbryum sp.)
- SH1119462.09FU (Microbryum sp.)
- SH1119464.09FU (Microbryum sp.)
- SH1119465.09FU (Microbryum sp.)
- SH1119471.09FU (Microbryum sp.)
- SH1119472.09FU (Microbryum sp.)
- SH1119473.09FU (Microbryum sp.)
- SH1119474.09FU (Microbryum sp.)
- SH1119475.09FU (Microbryum sp.)
- SH1119476.09FU (Microbryum sp.)
- SH1119477.09FU (Microbryum sp.)
- SH1119478.09FU (Microbryum sp.)
- SH1119482.09FU (Microbryum sp.)
- SH1119484.09FU (Microbryum sp.)
- SH1119489.09FU (Microbryum sp.)
- SH1119490.09FU (Microbryum sp.)
- SH1119492.09FU (Microbryum sp.)
- SH1119493.09FU (Microbryum sp.)
- SH1119496.09FU (Microbryum sp.)
- SH1119498.09FU (Microbryum sp.)
- SH1119499.09FU (Microbryum sp.)
- SH1119500.09FU (Microbryum sp.)
- SH1119503.09FU (Microbryum sp.)
- SH1119505.09FU (Microbryum sp.)
- SH1119506.09FU (Microbryum sp.)
- SH1119507.09FU (Microbryum sp.)
- SH1119508.09FU (Microbryum sp.)
- SH1119511.09FU (Microbryum sp.)
- SH1119512.09FU (Microbryum sp.)
- SH1119513.09FU (Microbryum sp.)
- SH1119515.09FU (Microbryum sp.)
- SH1119516.09FU (Microbryum sp.)
- SH1119517.09FU (Microbryum sp.)
- SH1119518.09FU (Microbryum sp.)
- SH1119519.09FU (Microbryum sp.)
- SH1169269.09FU (Microbryum sp.)
- SH1169271.09FU (Microbryum sp.)
- SH1187740.09FU (Microbryum sp.)
- SH1191575.09FU (Microbryum sp.)
- SH1238548.09FU (Microbryum sp.)
