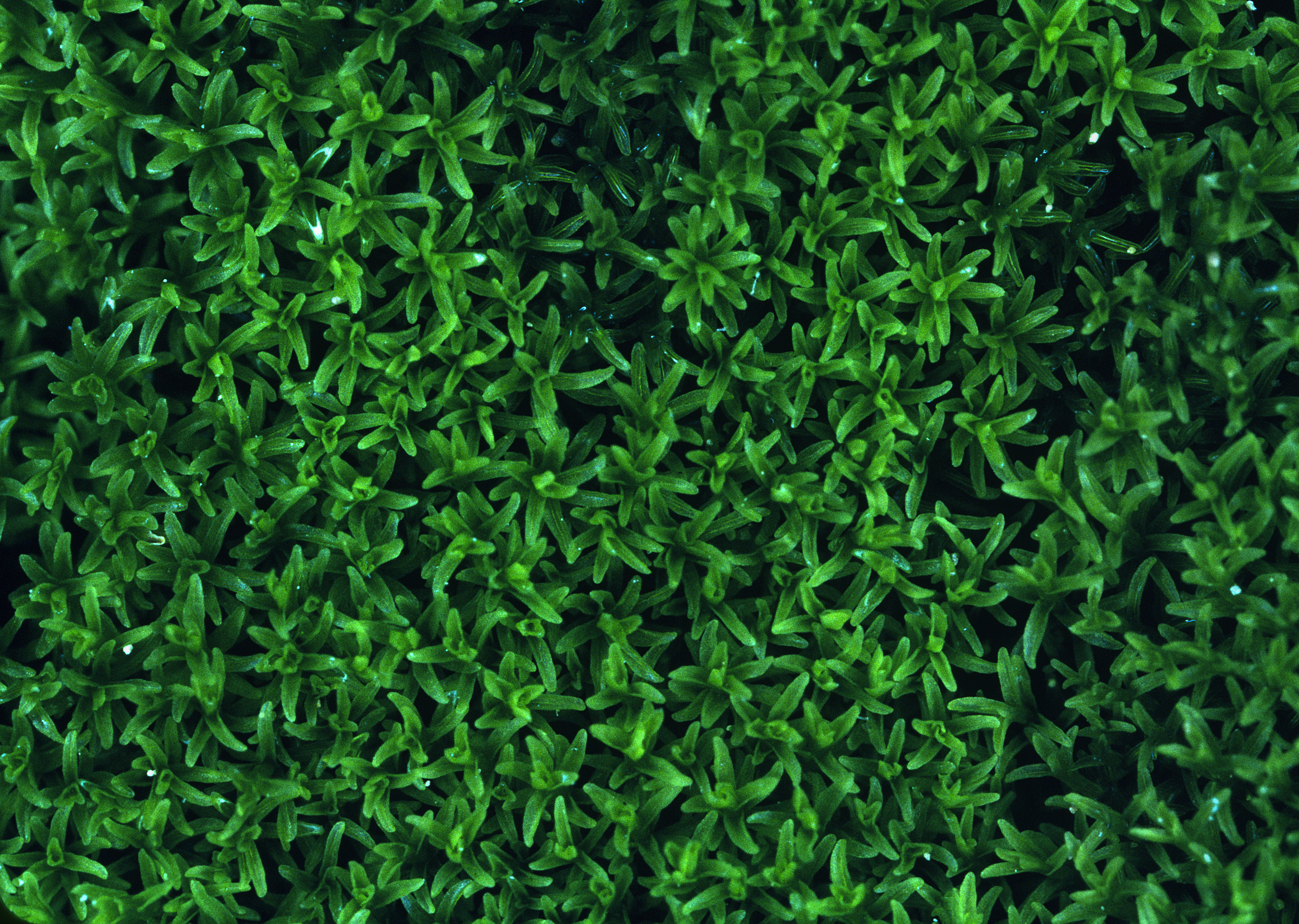

Scientific classification
- Kingdom: Plantae
- Division: Bryophyta
- Class: Bryopsida
- Subclass: Dicranidae
- Order: Pottiales
- Family: Pottiaceae
- Genus: Gymnostomum
- Species: G. calcareum

Binomial name
- Gymnostomum calcareum Nees & Hornsch.

= Gymnostomum calcareum =

Species of moss

Gymnostomum calcareum is a species of moss belonging to the family Pottiaceae.

It has cosmopolitan distribution.
