= Timmiellaceae =

Scientific classification
- Kingdom: Plantae
- Division: Bryophyta
- Class: Bryopsida
- Subclass: Dicranidae
- Order: Distichiales
- Family: Timmiellaceae; Y.Inoue & H.Tsubota

Family of haplolepideous mosses

Timmiellaceae is a family of haplolepideous mosses (Dicranidae). It contains two genera, Luisierella and Timmiella, that were formerly place in family Pottiaceae.

== Taxonomy ==
The genera Luisierella and Timmiella have been traditionally placed in family Pottiaceae in order Pottiales. However, phylogenetic analyses have found these genera to form a clade, as part of a protohaplolepidous grade of early branching lineages in Dicranidae, for which the family Timmiellaceae was erected. The family is now placed in order Distichiales along with family Distichiaceae.

== Genera and species ==
The family contains the following genera and species:

- Luisierella Thér. & P. de la Varde
  - Luisierella barbula (Schwägr.) Steere
  - Luisierella pusilla Thér. & P. de la Varde
  - Luisierella stenocarpa Bizot & Thér.
- Timmiella (De Not.) Schimp.
  - Timmiella acaulon (Müll. Hal.) R.H. Zander
  - Timmiella alata Herzog
  - Timmiella anomala (Bruch & Schimp.) Limpr.
  - Timmiella barbuloides (Brid.) Mönk.
  - Timmiella brevidens Dixon
  - Timmiella cameruniae Broth.
  - Timmiella corniculata (Wahlenb.) Broth.
  - Timmiella crassinervis (Hampe) L.F. Koch
  - Timmiella diminuta (Müll. Hal.) P.C. Chen
  - Timmiella flexiseta (Bruch) Limpr.
  - Timmiella grosseserrata Schiffner
  - Timmiella multiflora (Müll. Hal.) Broth.
  - Timmiella pelindaba Magill
  - Timmiella rosulata (Müll. Hal.) Broth.
  - Timmiella subintegra Dixon
  - Timmiella umbrosa (Müll. Hal.) Broth.
