= Gyroweisia =

Scientific classification
- Kingdom: Plantae
- Division: Bryophyta
- Class: Bryopsida
- Subclass: Dicranidae
- Order: Pottiales
- Family: Pottiaceae
- Genus: Gyroweisia; Schimp.

Genus of mosses

Gyroweisia is a genus of mosses belonging to the family Pottiaceae.

The genus was first described by Wilhelm Philippe Schimper.

The genus has cosmopolitan distribution.

The genus contains seven species:

- Gyroweisia barbulacea Brotherus, 1902
- Gyroweisia monterreia Zander & F. J. Hermann, 1986 [1987]
- Gyroweisia reflexa W. P. Schimper, 1876
- Gyroweisia rohlfsiana Paris, 1896
- Gyroweisia shansiensis Sakurai, 1949
- Gyroweisia tenuis W. P. Schimper, 1876
- Gyroweisia yuennanensis Brotherus, 1929
