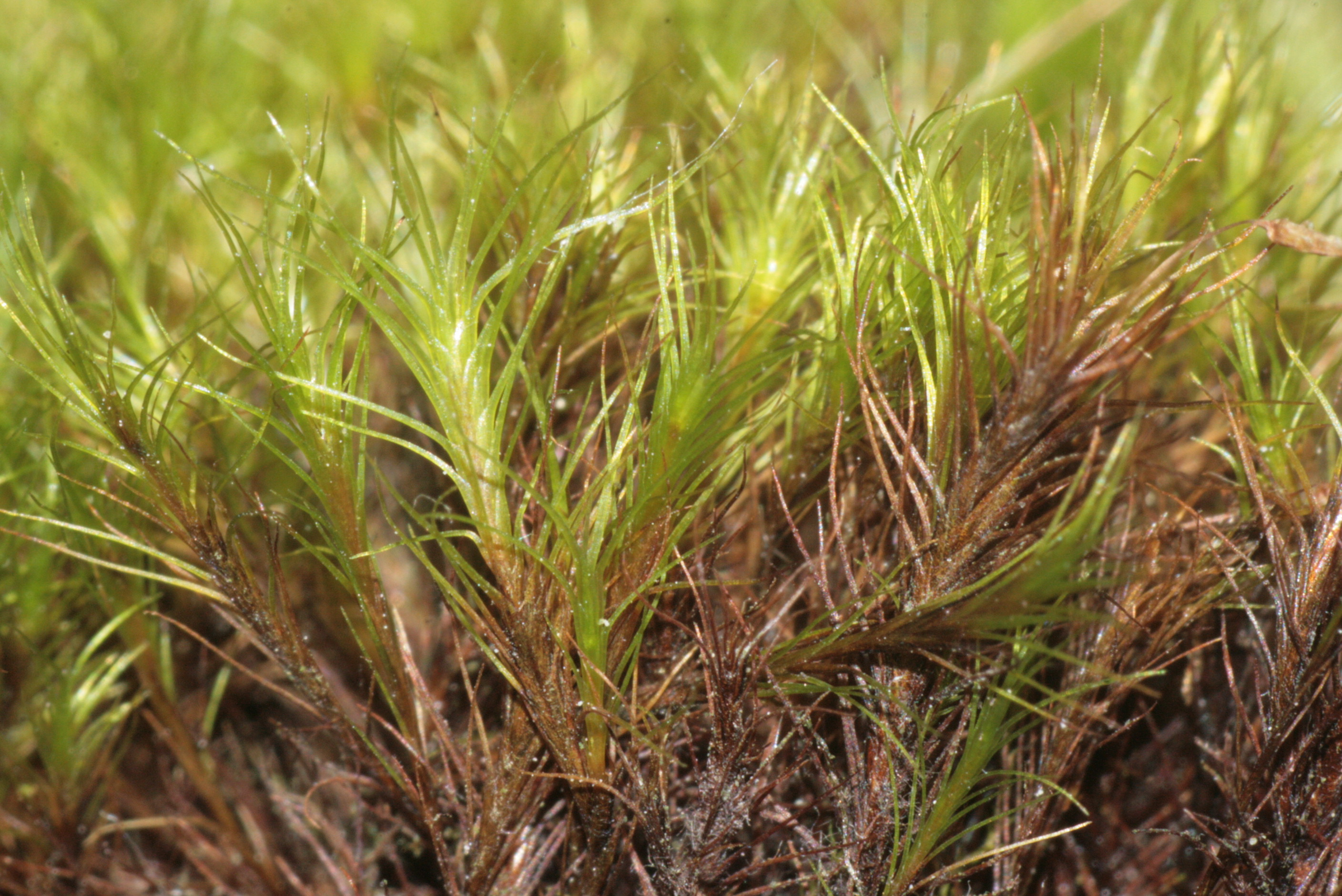
- Distichium capillaceum

Scientific classification
- Kingdom: Plantae
- Division: Bryophyta
- Class: Bryopsida
- Subclass: Dicranidae
- Order: Distichiales
- Family: Distichiaceae; Schimp.
- Genus: Distichium; Bruch & Schimp.

= Distichium =

Genus of haplolepideous mosses

Distichium is a genus of haplolepideous mosses (Dicranidae) in the monotypic family Distichiaceae.

== Taxonomy ==
The genus Distichium has traditionally been considered part of family Ditrichaceae. However, phylogenetic analyses have found Ditrichaceae to be polyphyletic and Distichium part of a protohaplolepidous grade of early branching lineages in Dicranidae. Based on these studies Distichium was restored to Distichiaceae, where it was originally placed by Schimper (1860). The family is now placed in order Distichiales along with family Timmiellaceae.

== Species ==
The genus contains the following species:

- Distichium asperrimum Müll. Hal.
- Distichium austroinclinatum Müll. Hal.
- Distichium brachyphyllum Müll. Hal.
- Distichium brachystegium Müll. Hal.
- Distichium brevifolium Müll. Hal.
- Distichium brevisetum C. Gao
- Distichium bryoxiphioidium C. Gao
- Distichium capillaceum (Hedw.) Bruch & Schimp.
- Distichium crispatum Müll. Hal.
- Distichium hagenii Ryan ex H. Philib.
- Distichium inclinatum (Hedw.) Bruch & Schimp.
- Distichium lorentzii Müll. Hal.
- Distichium remotifolium Müll. Hal.
- Distichium setifolium Müll. Hal.
- Distichium strictifolium Müll. Hal.
- Distichium vernicosum Müll. Hal.
