= Gertrudiella =

Scientific classification
- Kingdom: Plantae
- Division: Bryophyta
- Class: Bryopsida
- Subclass: Dicranidae
- Order: Pottiales
- Family: Pottiaceae
- Genus: Gertrudiella; V.F.Brotherus, 1925

Genus of mosses

Gertrudiella is a genus of mosses belonging to the family Pottiaceae.

The genus name of Gertrudiella is in honour of Gertrud Herzog (nee Locherer, b.1888), who was the wife of botanist Theodor Carl Julius Herzog (1880 - 1961).

The genus was circumscribed by Viktor Ferdinand Brotherus in Nat. Pflanzenfam. (Engler & Prantl) ed.2, vol.11 on page 528 in 1925.

The species of this genus are found in Southern America.

Species:

- Gertrudiella ferruginea Hilp.
- Gertrudiella gelida (Cardot) J.A. Jiménez & M.J. Cano
- Gertrudiella validinervis Brotherus, 1925
