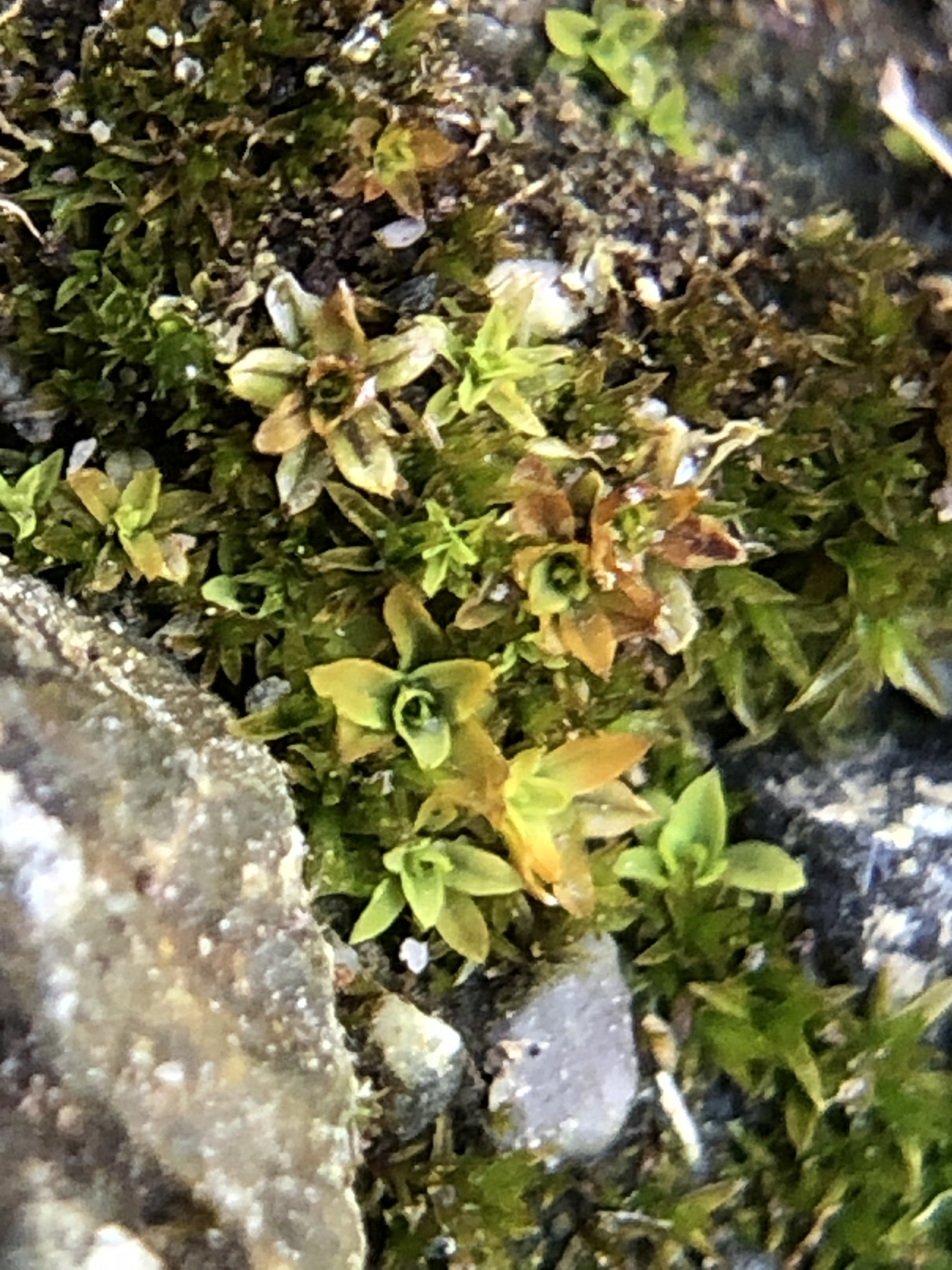
- Hennediella stanfordensis

Scientific classification
- Kingdom: Plantae
- Division: Bryophyta
- Class: Bryopsida
- Subclass: Dicranidae
- Order: Pottiales
- Family: Pottiaceae
- Genus: Hennediella; Paris

Synonyms
- Beckettia Müll.Hal.; Hennedia R.Br.bis; Neobarbula Dusén

= Hennediella =

Genus of mosses

Hennediella is a genus of mosses belonging to the family Pottiaceae.

The genus is named in honour of Roger Hennedy (1809 - 1877), a Scottish printer and botanist specializing in pteridology.

The genus was circumscribed by Jean Édouard Gabriel Narcisse Paris in Index bryologicus (Paris) vol.2 on page 557 in 1895.

The genus has a cosmopolitan distribution.

== Species ==
The following species are recognised in the genus Hennediella:

- Hennediella antarctica (Ångstr.) Ochyra & Matteri
- Hennediella arenae (Besch.) R.H.Zander
- Hennediella bellii (E.B.Bartram) R.H.Zander
- Hennediella densifolia (Hook.f. & Wilson) R.H.Zander
- Hennediella denticulata (Wilson) R.H.Zander
- Hennediella heimii (Hedw.) R.H.Zander
- Hennediella heteroloma (Cardot) R.H.Zander
- Hennediella kunzeana (Müll.Hal.) R.H.Zander
- Hennediella longipedunculata (Müll.Hal.) R.H.Zander
- Hennediella longirostris (Hampe ex Müll.Hal.) R.H.Zander
- Hennediella macrophylla (R.Br.bis) Paris
- Hennediella marginata (Hook.f. & Wilson) R.H.Zander
- Hennediella polyseta (Müll.Hal.) R.H.Zander
- Hennediella stanfordensis (Steere) Blockeel
- Hennediella steereana (R.H.Zander & H.A.Crum) R.H.Zander
- SH1119457.09FU (Hennediella sp.)
- SH1119483.09FU (Hennediella sp.)
- SH1119488.09FU (Hennediella sp.)
- SH1187739.09FU (Hennediella sp.)
