= Leptodontium =

Scientific classification
- Kingdom: Plantae
- Division: Bryophyta
- Class: Bryopsida
- Subclass: Dicranidae
- Order: Pottiales
- Family: Pottiaceae
- Genus: Leptodontium (Müll.Hal.) Hampe ex Lindb.

Synonyms
- Austroleptodontium R.H.Zander; Crassileptodontium R.H.Zander; Microleptodontium R.H.Zander; Rubroleptodontium R.H.Zander; Stephanoleptodontium R.H.Zander; Williamsia Broth.; Williamsiella E.Britton

Genus of bryophyte

Leptodontium is a genus of moss in the family Pottiaceae. It has a global distribution.

The following species are assigned to this genus:

- Leptodontium aggregatum (Müll.Hal.) Kindb.
- Leptodontium allorgei Bizot
- Leptodontium araucarieti (Müll.Hal.) Paris
- Leptodontium brachyphyllum Broth. & Thér.
- Leptodontium capituligerum Müll.Hal.
- Leptodontium chenianum X.J.Li & M.Zang
- Leptodontium erythroneuron Herzog
- Leptodontium excelsum (Sull.) E.Britton
- Leptodontium filicola Herzog
- Leptodontium flexifolium (Dicks.) Hampe
- Leptodontium flexifolium (Dicks.) Hampe ex Lindb.
- Leptodontium fuhrmannii Broth. & Irmsch.
- Leptodontium gemmascens (Mitt.) Braithw.
- Leptodontium interruptum (Mitt.) Broth.
- Leptodontium latifolium Broth.
- Leptodontium longicaule Mitt.
- Leptodontium luteum (Taylor) Mitt.
- Leptodontium proliferum Herzog
- Leptodontium pungens (Mitt.) Kindb.
- Leptodontium repens Kindb.
- Leptodontium rhynchophorum Dixon
- Leptodontium saxicola Müll.Hal. ex Paris
- Leptodontium scaberrimum Broth.
- Leptodontium splachnoides (Hook. & Arn.) Thér.
- Leptodontium stellaticuspis E.B.Bartram
- Leptodontium stellatifolium (Hampe) Broth.
- Leptodontium stoloniferum R.H.Zander
- Leptodontium subintegrifolium Thér. ex Herzog
- Leptodontium syntrichioides (Müll.Hal.) Kindb.
- Leptodontium tricolor (R.S.Williams) R.H.Zander
- Leptodontium trifarium Broth.
- Leptodontium viticulosoides (P.Beauv.) Wijk & Margad.
- Leptodontium wallisii (Müll.Hal.) Kindb.
- Leptodontium zygodontoides Müll.Hal.
