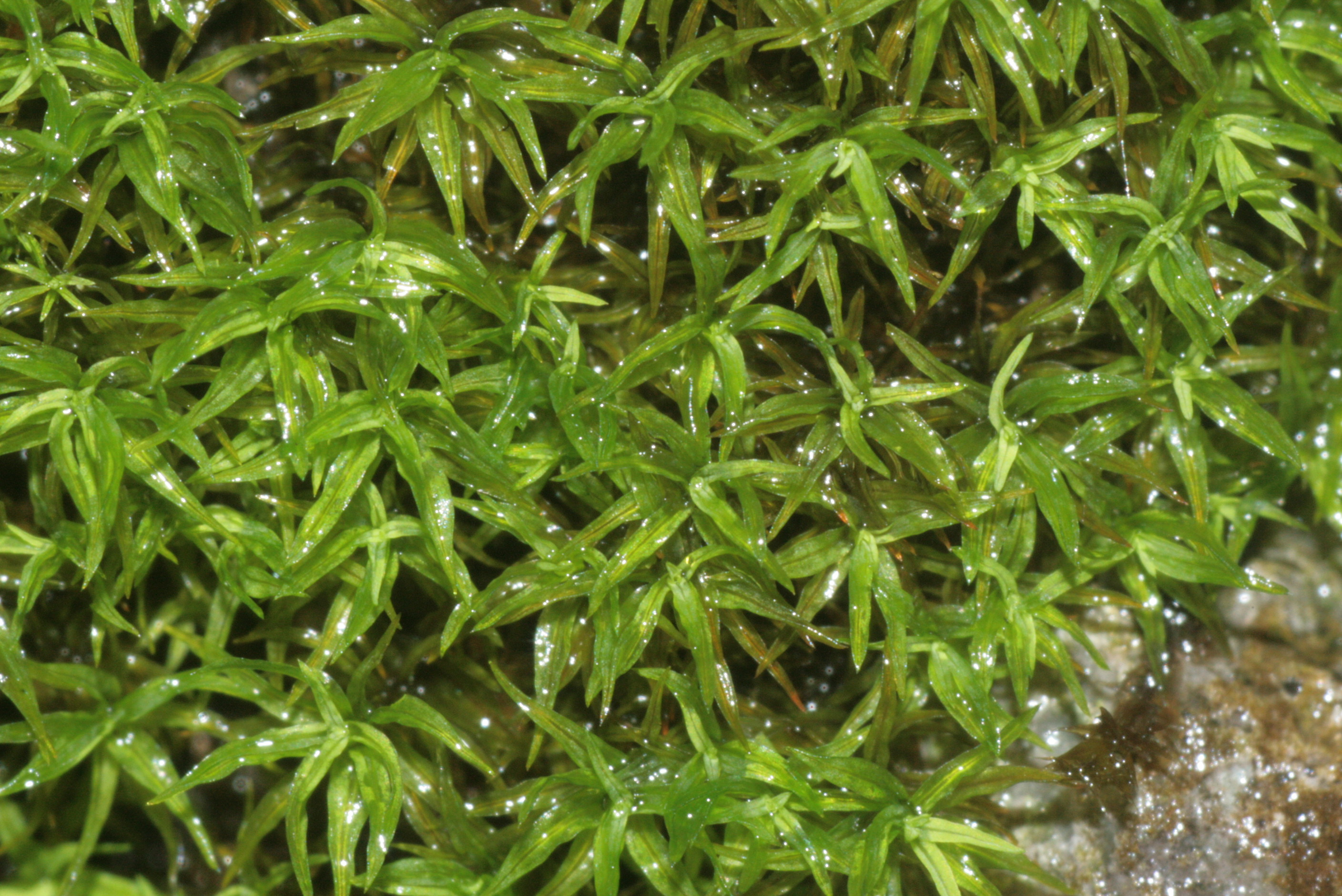
- Trichostomum crispulum

Scientific classification
- Kingdom: Plantae
- Division: Bryophyta
- Class: Bryopsida
- Subclass: Dicranidae
- Order: Pottiales
- Family: Pottiaceae
- Genus: Trichostomum; Bruch, 1829

= Trichostomum =

Genus of mosses

Trichostomum is a genus of mosses belonging to the family Pottiaceae.

The genus has a cosmopolitan distribution.

== Species ==
The following species are recognised in the genus Trichostomum:

- Trichostomum abyssinicum Zander, 1993
- Trichostomum acutiusculum Zander, 1993
- Trichostomum aeneum Müll.Hal.
- Trichostomum aequatoriale Spruce ex Dixon, 1924
- Trichostomum afrum Müll.Hal.
- Trichostomum aggregatum Müll.Hal.
- Trichostomum alpinum Kindberg, 1910
- Trichostomum amblyophyllum (Mont.) Müll.Hal.
- Trichostomum anoectangioides Müll.Hal.
- Trichostomum anomodon (Bals.-Criv. & De Not.) De Not.
- Trichostomum apiculatum R.Br.bis
- Trichostomum apophysatulum Herzog, 1916
- Trichostomum arboreum Zander, 1993
- Trichostomum arcticum Kaalaas, 1900
- Trichostomum ardjunense M.Fleisch.
- Trichostomum aristatulum Broth.
- Trichostomum atrocaule Zander, 1993
- Trichostomum atrovirens Rehmann ex Müll.Hal.
- Trichostomum austroalpigena Müll.Hal.
- Trichostomum austrocrispum Zander, 1993
- Trichostomum bellii E.B.Bartram, 1955
- Trichostomum bermudanum (Mitt.) Paris
- Trichostomum bescherellei Schimp.
- Trichostomum bifidum (Brid.) Brid.
- Trichostomum borneense Zander, 1993
- Trichostomum brachydontium Bruch, 1829
- Trichostomum brevisetum Thér.
- Trichostomum brittonianum Zander, 1993
- Trichostomum brunneum Müll.Hal.
- Trichostomum calymperaceum Brotherus & Paris, 1904
- Trichostomum calyptratum (Taylor) Müll.Hal.
- Trichostomum cameruniae (Broth.) Paris
- Trichostomum campylocarpum Müll.Hal.
- Trichostomum campylopyxis Müll.Hal.
- Trichostomum canaliculatum Sull.
- Trichostomum cardotii Bizot, 1976
- Trichostomum carinatum E.B.Bartram, 1957
- Trichostomum castaneum Zander, 1993
- Trichostomum cavernarum Broth.
- Trichostomum challaense Broth.
- Trichostomum circinatum (Besch.) Broth.
- Trichostomum circinnatulum Broth.
- Trichostomum clavinerve H.O.Whittier, 1974
- Trichostomum cockaynii R.Br.bis
- Trichostomum compactulum C.Müller, 1879
- Trichostomum compactulum Müll.Hal.
- Trichostomum connivens Paris, 1898
- Trichostomum contortifolium (Mitt.) A.Jaeger
- Trichostomum contortum (Kunze) Sérgio
- Trichostomum contractum Zander, 1993
- Trichostomum corniculatum (Wahlenb.) Schwägr.
- Trichostomum criotum Zander, 1993
- Trichostomum crispulum Bruch, 1829
- Trichostomum crustaceum Müll.Hal.
- Trichostomum curtum (Hedw.) F.Weber & D.Mohr
- Trichostomum cuspidatum (Dozy & Molk.) Dozy & Molk.
- Trichostomum deciduaefolium Zander, 1993
- Trichostomum decurvifolium Dixon
- Trichostomum diminutum Müll.Hal.
- Trichostomum distans Hampe, 1849
- Trichostomum duidense E.B.Bartram
- Trichostomum eckelianum Zander, 1993
- Trichostomum edentulum Brotherus, 1916
- Trichostomum elliottii Brotherus ex Dusén, 1906
- Trichostomum episemum Stirt.
- Trichostomum esquirolii Thér.
- Trichostomum etessei Broth. & Paris
- Trichostomum excurrens (Broth.) Kindb.
- Trichostomum exulatum Zander, 1993
- Trichostomum fallaciosum W.H.Welch & H.Crum, 1960
- Trichostomum fallax Herzog, 1909
- Trichostomum fendleri Müll.Hal.
- Trichostomum finukamactum R.H.Zander
- Trichostomum flavisetum A.P.de Candolle, 1815
- Trichostomum fontanum Müll.Hal.
- Trichostomum fragilifolium Dixon, 1930
- Trichostomum glauco-viride Dusén
- Trichostomum glaucoviride Müll.Hal.
- Trichostomum gracilescens (Müll.Hal. ex E.Britton) Müll.Hal.
- Trichostomum gracillimum C.Müller, 1879
- Trichostomum gracillimum Müll.Hal.
- Trichostomum grimmioides (Müll.Hal. ex E.Britton) Müll.Hal.
- Trichostomum grossirete Broth. & Dixon
- Trichostomum gymnum Müll.Hal.
- Trichostomum hattorianum B.C.Tan & Iwatsuki, 1993
- Trichostomum hibernicum Dixon, 1896
- Trichostomum hondurense B.H.Allen, 2002
- Trichostomum humile (Hedw.) Guim.
- Trichostomum hyalinoblastum Brotherus, 1902
- Trichostomum imperfectum Müll.Hal.
- Trichostomum imshaugii Zander, 1993
- Trichostomum incertum Zander, 1993
- Trichostomum inclinatum (Sendtn.) Müll.Hal.
- Trichostomum insulare Brotherus, 1902
- Trichostomum interruptum (Mitt.) Besch.
- Trichostomum involutum Sullivant, 1861
- Trichostomum jamesonii (Taylor) Mitt.
- Trichostomum julaceum Dusén
- Trichostomum kanieriense R.Brown ter, 1903
- Trichostomum knightii Hampe ex C.Müller, 1900
- Trichostomum knightii Hampe ex Müll.Hal.
- Trichostomum laetum Kunze ex Müll.Hal.
- Trichostomum lambii E.B.Bartram, 1964-65
- Trichostomum lamprothecium Müll.Hal.
- Trichostomum laticostatum Thériot, 1921
- Trichostomum leptocylindricum C.Müller, 1898
- Trichostomum leptocylindricum Müll.Hal.
- Trichostomum leptodum (Mont.) Mitt.
- Trichostomum leptotheca C.Müller, 1868
- Trichostomum leptotheca Müll.Hal.
- Trichostomum lignicola Herzog, 1924
- Trichostomum ligulaefolium Zander, 1993
- Trichostomum lillei Dixon, 1926
- Trichostomum lindigii Zander, 1993
- Trichostomum lineare (Dicks. ex With.) Sm.
- Trichostomum linoides (Hedw.) Brid.
- Trichostomum lorifolium Brotherus & Paris, 1904
- Trichostomum majus Podp.
- Trichostomum mandonii (Müll.Hal. ex E.Britton) Müll.Hal.
- Trichostomum marginatum H.Rob.
- Trichostomum mauiense (C.Müller) Brotherus, 1902
- Trichostomum melanostomum Zander, 1993
- Trichostomum mexicanum (Besch.) Müll.Hal.
- Trichostomum microthecium Müll.Hal.
- Trichostomum mildeanum Juratzka, 1870
- Trichostomum minutifolium R.Br.bis
- Trichostomum minutissimum Sakurai, 1943
- Trichostomum mitteneanum Zander, 1993
- Trichostomum mosis Lorentz
- Trichostomum mucronatulum Cardot
- Trichostomum mucronatum Besch.
- Trichostomum muticum Paris, 1898
- Trichostomum nervosum Bruch
- Trichostomum nodiflorum Müll.Hal.
- Trichostomum nordenskioeldii Schimp.
- Trichostomum occidentale (Mitt.) A.Jaeger
- Trichostomum orthodontum Brotherus, 1902
- Trichostomum ovatifolium Zander, 1993
- Trichostomum pallidens (Dixon) R.H.Zander
- Trichostomum paludicola Hilpert, 1933
- Trichostomum papillosum (Dicks.) Sm.
- Trichostomum pennequinii Renauld & Paris, 1900
- Trichostomum perangustum Bescherelle, 1875
- Trichostomum perichaetiale Hook.
- Trichostomum perinvolutum Tixier, 1966
- Trichostomum perligulatum Zander, 1993
- Trichostomum perplexum Potier de la Varde, 1939
- Trichostomum perpusillum C.Müller ex Warnstorf, 1916
- Trichostomum perrieri Thériot, 1922
- Trichostomum persicum Juratzka & Milde, 1870
- Trichostomum perviride Broth.
- Trichostomum philippinense Iwatsuki & B.C.Tan, 1979
- Trichostomum piliferum (Dickson) Smith, 1804
- Trichostomum planifolium Zander, 1993
- Trichostomum platyphyllum (Broth. ex Iisiba) P.C.Chen
- Trichostomum platyphyllum Chen Pan-chieh, 1941
- Trichostomum plicatulum C.Müller, 1882
- Trichostomum plicatulum Müll.Hal.
- Trichostomum pomangium Herzog, 1916
- Trichostomum portoricense H.Crum & Steere, 1956
- Trichostomum prionodon C.Müller, 1898
- Trichostomum prionodon Müll.Hal.
- Trichostomum protensum A.Braun ex Duby
- Trichostomum pulicare Zander, 1993
- Trichostomum pygmaeum E.B.Bartram, 1946
- Trichostomum pyriforme Lesq. & James
- Trichostomum ramulosum Schimp. ex Besch.
- Trichostomum recurvifolium Zander, 1993
- Trichostomum rehmannii Sim
- Trichostomum repens Müll.Hal.
- Trichostomum rhodesiae Brotherus, 1913
- Trichostomum riparium (Host ex Brid.) D.Mohr
- Trichostomum rivale A.Jaeger
- Trichostomum robustum Broth. ex Iisiba
- Trichostomum rubripes Mitt.
- Trichostomum ruvenzorense Brotherus, 1902
- Trichostomum saxicola (F.Weber & D.Mohr) Hornsch.
- Trichostomum schimperi Mont.
- Trichostomum searellii R.Br.bis
- Trichostomum semivaginatum (Schimp. ex E.Britton) Schimp. ex Paris
- Trichostomum setifolium Müll.Hal.
- Trichostomum sinaloense Zander, 1993
- Trichostomum sinochenii Redfearn & B.C.Tan, 1995
- Trichostomum soulae Zander, 1993
- Trichostomum sparsifolium (Renauld & Cardot) Cardot
- Trichostomum spathulato-lineare Müll.Hal.
- Trichostomum spirale Grout, 1938
- Trichostomum sporaphyllum Cardot, 1915
- Trichostomum squarrosum (Bridel) Bridel
- Trichostomum stanilandsii R.Brown ter, 1903
- Trichostomum stellatum (Brid.) Müll.Hal.
- Trichostomum striatum (P.Beauv.) Arn.
- Trichostomum strictum Sw. ex F.Weber & D.Mohr
- Trichostomum subangustifolium Zander, 1993
- Trichostomum subcirrhatum Hampe, 1875
- Trichostomum subconnivens Thériot, 1941
- Trichostomum subintegrum Brotherus, 1902
- Trichostomum subinvolvens Thér.
- Trichostomum sublamprothecium Paris, 1898
- Trichostomum subsecundum Hook. & Grev. ex Harv.
- Trichostomum sumatranum Baumgartner
- Trichostomum sweetii Stark, 1996
- Trichostomum syntrichioides Müll.Hal.
- Trichostomum tenuirostre Lindberg, 1864
- Trichostomum termitarum Zander, 1993
- Trichostomum tisserantii (P.de la Varde) R.H.Zander
- Trichostomum tortella Müll.Hal.
- Trichostomum tortelloides Zander, 1993
- Trichostomum tortuloides Sull. & Lesq.
- Trichostomum tovarense Müll.Hal.
- Trichostomum trachyneuron (Kindb.) Paris
- Trichostomum triumphans De Not.
- Trichostomum tucumanense E.B.Bartram, 1964-65
- Trichostomum umbrosum Müll.Hal.
- Trichostomum unguiculatum Zander, 1993
- Trichostomum urceolare Zander, 1993
- Trichostomum usambaricum Brotherus, 1902
- Trichostomum vancouveriense (Broth.) Kindb.
- Trichostomum villaumei Thériot, 1923
- Trichostomum wagneri Brotherus, 1902
- Trichostomum wayanadense M.C.Nair, K.P.Rajesh & P.V.Madhusoodanan
- Trichostomum weisioides C.Müller, 1898
- Trichostomum whittonii R.Brown ter, 1903
- Trichostomum wildii (Broth.) Kindb.
- Trichostomum williamsii Zander, 1993
- Trichostomum winteri (Schimp.) Husn.
- Trichostomum woodii (Schimp.) Husn.
- Trichostomum zanderi Redfearn & B.C.Tan, 1995
