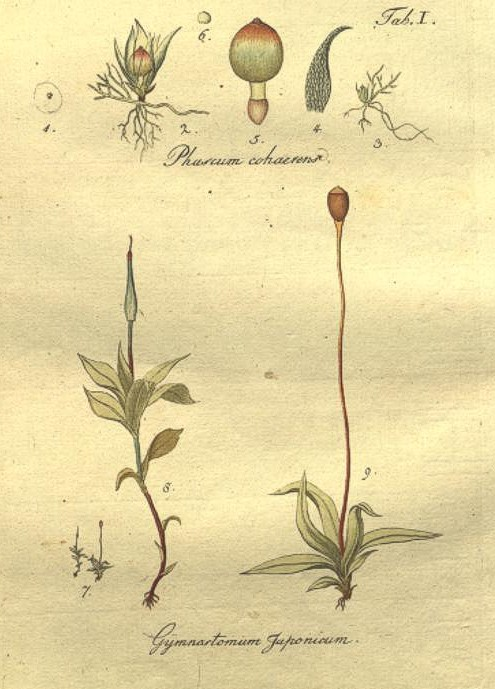

Scientific classification
- Kingdom: Plantae
- Division: Bryophyta
- Class: Bryopsida
- Subclass: Dicranidae
- Order: Pottiales
- Family: Pottiaceae
- Genus: Gymnostomum; Nees & Hornsch.

= Gymnostomum =

Genus of mosses

Gymnostomum is a genus of bryophyte in family Pottiaceae. It was first described by Christian Gottfried Daniel Nees von Esenbeck and Christian Friedrich Hornschuch.

== Species ==
The following species are recognised in the genus Gymnostomum:

- Gymnostomum aeruginosum Sm.
- Gymnostomum bahiense Salzm. ex Duby
- Gymnostomum bescherellei Broth. & Geh.
- Gymnostomum bewsii Sim ex Dixon
- Gymnostomum calcareum Nees & Hornsch.
- Gymnostomum carthusianum (Vill. ex Brid.) P.Beauv.
- Gymnostomum chenii K.Saito
- Gymnostomum foliosum Röhl.
- Gymnostomum hymenostylioides (Broth. & Dixon) R.H.Zander
- Gymnostomum laxirete (Broth.) P.C.Chen
- Gymnostomum lessonii Besch.
- Gymnostomum lingulatum Rehmann ex Sim
- Gymnostomum ludovicae Broth. & Paris
- Gymnostomum madagascariense O'Shea
- Gymnostomum mosis (Lorentz) Jur. & Milde
- Gymnostomum simplicissimum (Lour. ex P.Beauv.) Brid.
- Gymnostomum splachnobryoides Bizot
- Gymnostomum unguiculatum H.Philib.
- Gymnostomum viridulum Brid.
