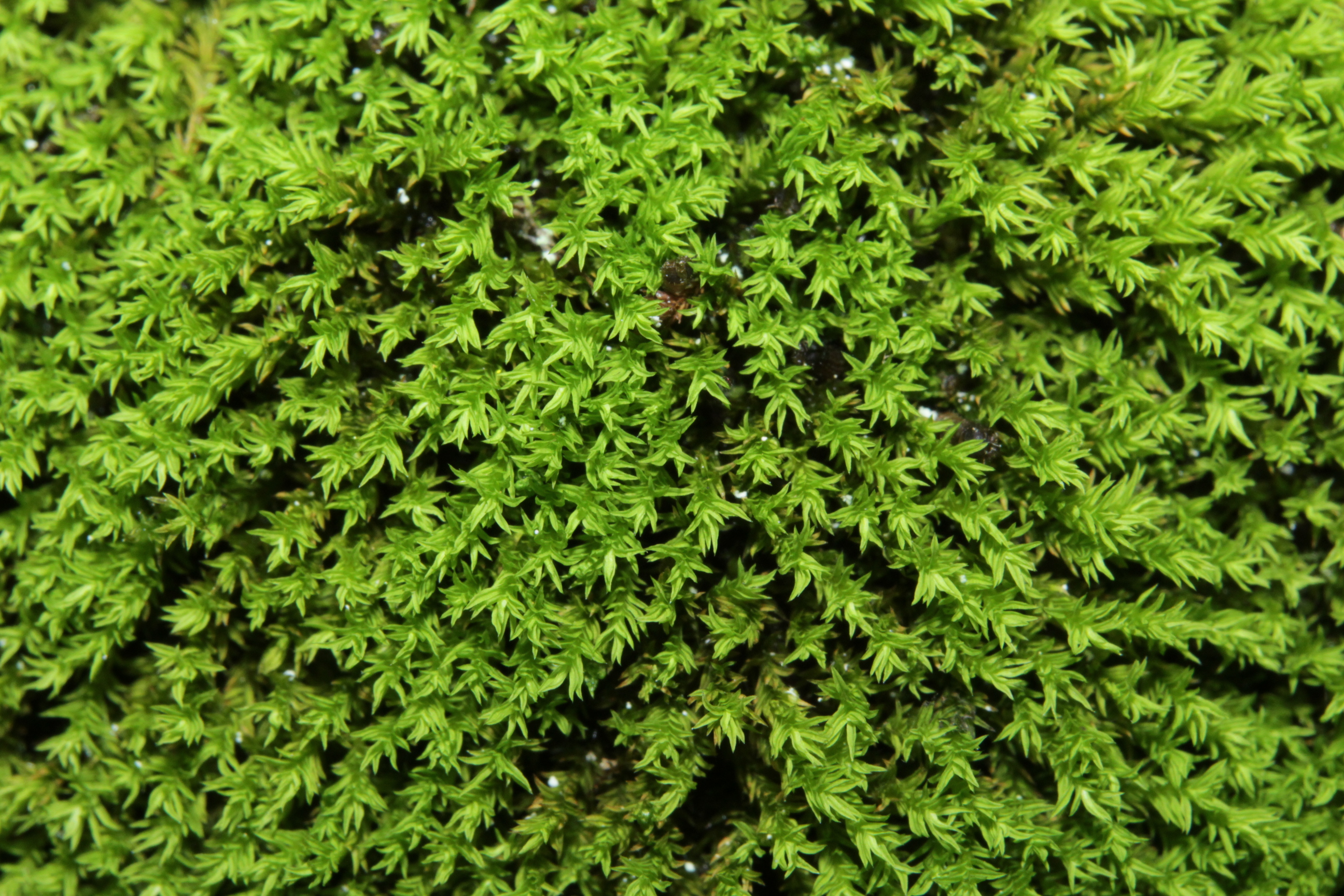
- Anoectangium aestivum

Scientific classification
- Kingdom: Plantae
- Division: Bryophyta
- Class: Bryopsida
- Subclass: Dicranidae
- Order: Pottiales
- Family: Pottiaceae
- Genus: Anoectangium; Schwägr.

= Anoectangium =

Genus of mosses

Anoectangium is a genus of mosses belonging to the family Pottiaceae.

The genus has cosmopolitan distribution.

== Species ==
Species:

- Anoectangium abyssinicum Hampe ex Geheeb, 1899
- Anoectangium aestivum Mitten, 1869
