= Luisierella =

Scientific classification
- Kingdom: Plantae
- Division: Bryophyta
- Class: Bryopsida
- Subclass: Dicranidae
- Order: Distichiales
- Family: Timmiellaceae
- Genus: Luisierella; Thér. & P.de la Varde

Genus of mosses

Luisierella is a genus of mosses belonging to the family Timmiellaceae.

It was in the family Pottiaceae but due to molecular phylogenetic analysis in 2014, it was placed in Timmiellaceae.

The genus has almost cosmopolitan distribution, found in the United States, Mexico, West Indies, Central America, South America and in Asia.

Species;

- Luisierella barbula Steere, 1945
- Luisierella pusilla Thér. & P.de la Varde
- Luisierella stenocarpa Bizot & Thér.Bruch & Schimp.

The genus name of Luisierella is in honour of Alphonse Luisier (1872–1957), (Swiss born) Portuguese clergyman and botanist (Bryology).

The genus was circumscribed by Marie Hypolite Irénée Thériot and Robert André Léopold Potier de la Varde in Bull. Soc. Bot. France vol.83 on page 73 in 1936.
