= Eucladium =

Scientific classification
- Kingdom: Plantae
- Division: Bryophyta
- Class: Bryopsida
- Subclass: Dicranidae
- Order: Pottiales
- Family: Pottiaceae
- Genus: Eucladium; Bruch & Schimp.

Genus of mosses

Eucladium is a genus of mosses belonging to the family Pottiaceae.

The genus has almost cosmopolitan distribution.

Species:

- Eucladium commutatum Gl.
- Eucladium curvirostre
