= Sarconeurum =

Scientific classification
- Kingdom: Plantae
- Division: Bryophyta
- Class: Bryopsida
- Subclass: Dicranidae
- Order: Pottiales
- Family: Pottiaceae
- Genus: Sarconeurum; Bryhn, 1902

Genus of mosses

Sarconeurum is a genus of mosses belonging to the family Pottiaceae.

The species of this genus are found in Antarctica and Southern America.

Species:

- Sarconeurum antarcticum Bryhn
- Sarconeurum glaciale Cardot & Bryhn, 1907
