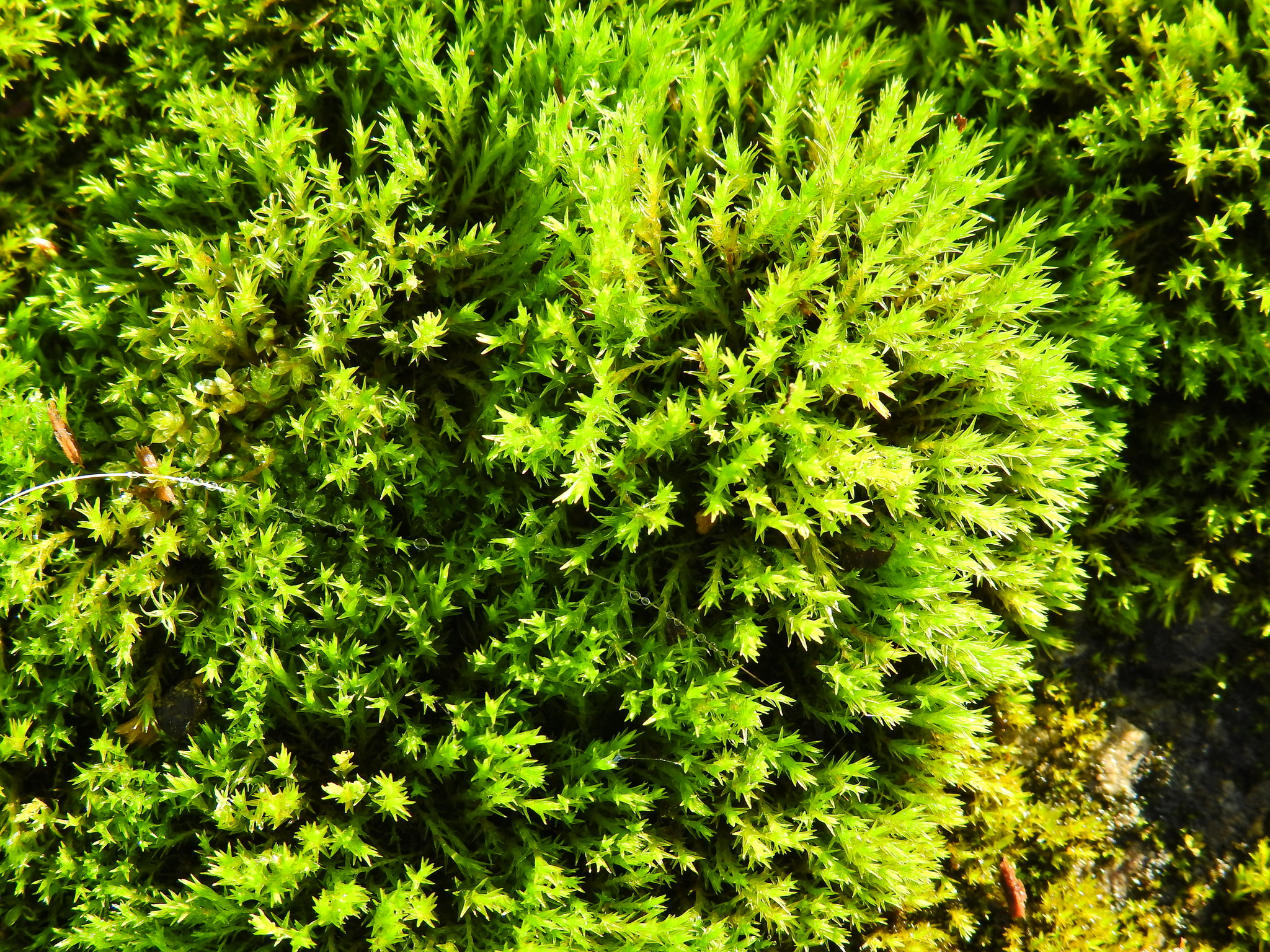
- Pseudocrossidium hornschuchianum

Scientific classification
- Kingdom: Plantae
- Division: Bryophyta
- Class: Bryopsida
- Subclass: Dicranidae
- Order: Pottiales
- Family: Pottiaceae
- Genus: Pseudocrossidium; R.S.Williams

= Pseudocrossidium =

Genus of mosses

Pseudocrossidium is a genus of mosses belonging to the family Pottiaceae. It has a cosmopolitan distribution.

== Species ==
The following species are recognised in the genus Pseudocrossidium:

- Pseudocrossidium adustum (Mitt.) M.J.Cano
- Pseudocrossidium apiculatum R.S.Williams, 1915
- Pseudocrossidium atacamensis, M.J.Cano, Larraín & J.A.Jiménez, 2025
- Pseudocrossidium austrorevolutum Zander, 1993
- Pseudocrossidium carinatum Zander, 1993
- Pseudocrossidium chilense R.S.Williams, 1915
- Pseudocrossidium crinitum Zander, 1993
- Pseudocrossidium elatum Delgadillo M., 1975
- Pseudocrossidium excavatum R.S.Williams, 1915
- Pseudocrossidium exiguum M.J.Cano & J.A.Jiménez
- Pseudocrossidium granulosum Churchill, 2000
- Pseudocrossidium hornschuchianum Zander, 1979
- Pseudocrossidium leucocalyx Thériot, 1921
- Pseudocrossidium linearifolium (Müll.Hal.) J.A.Jiménez & M.J.Cano
- Pseudocrossidium mendozense Zander, 1993
- Pseudocrossidium obtusulum H.Crum & L.E.Anderson, 1989
- Pseudocrossidium pachygastrellum Brotherus, 1924
- Pseudocrossidium pachyneuron (Dusén) Thér.
- Pseudocrossidium perpapillosum M.J.Cano & J.A.Jiménez
- Pseudocrossidium perrevolutum Zander, 1993
- Pseudocrossidium porphyreoneurum Zander, 1993
- Pseudocrossidium replicatum Zander, 1979
- Pseudocrossidium revolutum Zander, 1979
