= Molendoa =

Scientific classification
- Kingdom: Plantae
- Clade: Embryophytes
- Division: Bryophyta
- Class: Bryopsida
- Subclass: Dicranidae
- Order: Pottiales
- Family: Pottiaceae
- Genus: Molendoa

Synonyms
- Ozobryum

Genus of mosses

Molendoa is a genus of moss in family Pottiaceae.

== Species ==
The genus Molendoa contains the following species according to World Flora Online:

- Molendoa andina (Mitt.) Broth.
- Molendoa boliviana Broth.
- Molendoa burmensis E.B. Bartram
- Molendoa cucullata (Herzog) Hilp.
- Molendoa duthiei (Broth.) Broth.
- Molendoa excelsa (Müll. Hal.) Broth.
- Molendoa fuegiana E.B. Bartram
- Molendoa herzogii Broth.
- Molendoa hornschuchiana (Hook.) S.O. Lindberg ex Limpr.
- Molendoa kitaibelana Györffy
- Molendoa ogalalensis (G.L. Merr.) R.H. Zander
- Molendoa platyphyllum (R.S. Williams) R.H. Zander
- Molendoa roylei (Mitt.) Broth.
- Molendoa schliephackei (Limpr.) R.H. Zander
- Molendoa sendtneriana (Bruch & Schimp.) Limpr.
- Molendoa seravschanica Broth. & Györffy
- Molendoa sordida (Mitt.) Steere
- Molendoa subobtusifolia Broth.
- Molendoa taeniatifolia Herzog
- Molendoa tenuinervis Limpr.
- Molendoa warburgii (Crundw. & M.O. Hill) R.H. Zander
