= Oxystegus =

Scientific classification
- Kingdom: Plantae
- Division: Bryophyta
- Class: Bryopsida
- Subclass: Dicranidae
- Order: Pottiales
- Family: Pottiaceae
- Genus: Oxystegus (Limpr.) Hilp.

Genus of mosses

Oxystegus is a genus of mosses belonging to the family Pottiaceae.

The genus has cosmopolitan distribution.

Species:

- Oxystegus circinatus (Besch.) Hilp.
- Oxystegus cylindricus (Brid.) Hilp.
