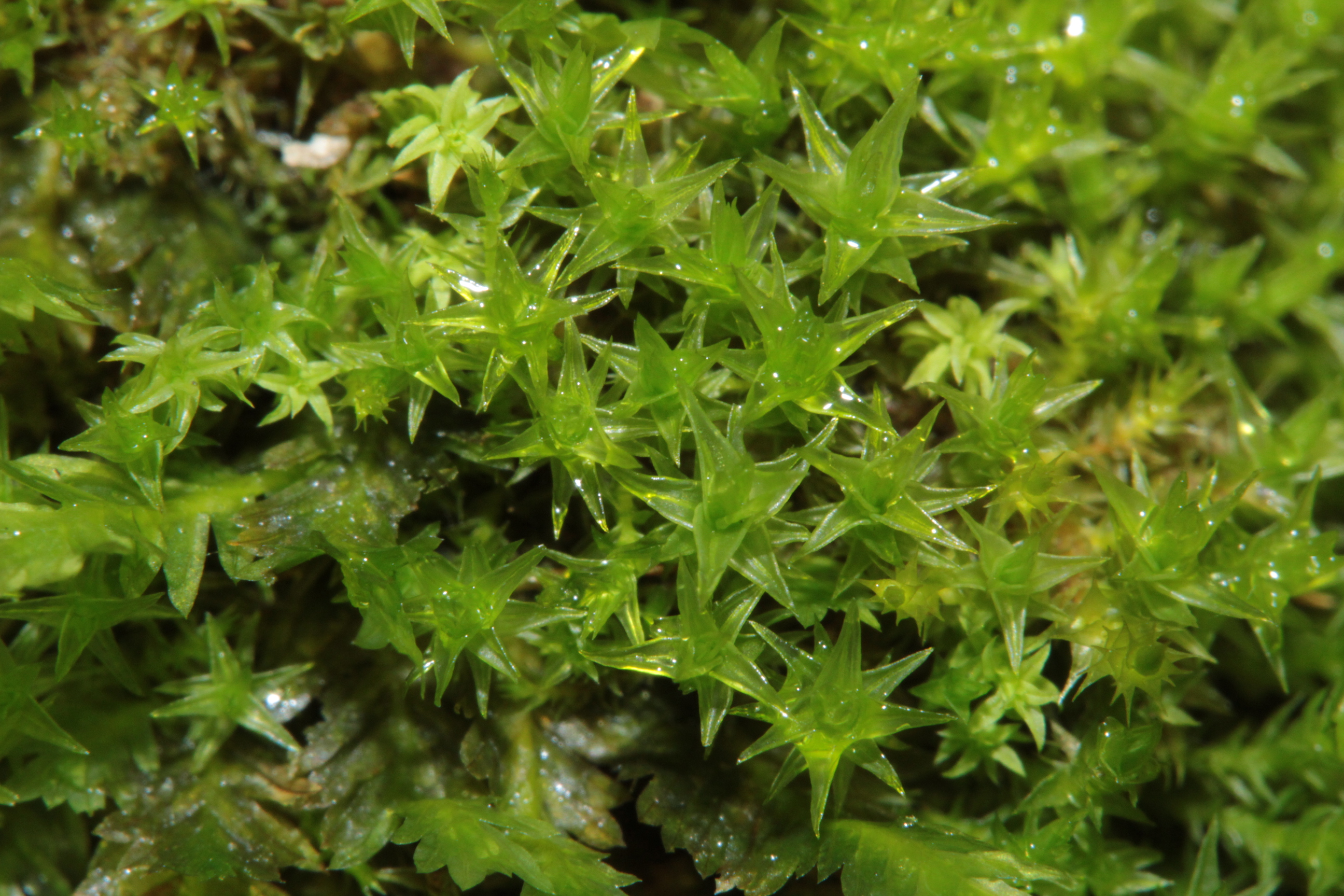
- Didymodon luridus

Scientific classification
- Kingdom: Plantae
- Division: Bryophyta
- Class: Bryopsida
- Subclass: Dicranidae
- Order: Pottiales
- Family: Pottiaceae
- Genus: Didymodon; Hedw.

Synonyms
- Didymodum Hedw. ex P.Beauv., 1804

= Didymodon =

Genus of mosses

Didymodon is a genus of mosses belonging to the family Pottiaceae. The genus has a cosmopolitan distribution.

== Species ==
The following species are recognised in the genus Didymodon:

- Didymodon aaronis J.Guerra, 1987
- Didymodon acutus (Brid.) K.Saito
- Didymodon aeneus (Müll.Hal.) Schimp.
- Didymodon aeruginosus Hook.
- Didymodon afer (Müll.Hal.) Broth.
- Didymodon affinis Garov.
- Didymodon aggregatus (Müll.Hal.) A.Jaeger
- Didymodon albicuspis (Mitten) Brotherus, 1902
- Didymodon alticaulis E.B.Bartram, 1947
- Didymodon amblyophyllus Brotherus, 1902
- Didymodon ampliretis E.B.Bartram, 1946
- Didymodon andreaeoides Cardot & Brotherus, 1923
- Didymodon angustatus (Mitt.) A.Jaeger
- Didymodon angustulus Herzog
- Didymodon anserinocapitatus Zander, 1993
- Didymodon apiculatus Arn.
- Didymodon argentinicus Paris, 1904
- Didymodon argentiniensis Warnstorf, 1916
- Didymodon asperifolius H.Crum, Steere & L.E.Anderson, 1964
- Didymodon australasiae Zander, 1978
- Didymodon austroalpigena Brotherus, 1902
- Didymodon barbulae Wibel ex Roemer, 1803
- Didymodon barbuloides Libert ex Marchal, 1872
- Didymodon bartramii Zander, 1993
- Didymodon berthoanus Thériot, 1926
- Didymodon bistratosus Hébrard & Pierrot, 1994
- Didymodon blyttii Hartm.
- Didymodon bombayensis (Müll.Hal.) A.Jaeger
- Didymodon brachyphyllus Zander, 1978
- Didymodon brasiliensis (Mitt.) A.Jaeger
- Didymodon brevicaulis Schultz
- Didymodon brevifolius (Sendtn. ex Müll.Hal.) Kindb.
- Didymodon brevisetus (Mitt.) A.Jaeger
- Didymodon brunneus Warnstorf, 1924
- Didymodon calycinus Dixon, 1915
- Didymodon calymperidictyon Broth.
- Didymodon calyptratus Taylor
- Didymodon campylocarpus (Müll.Hal.) Broth.
- Didymodon camusii Husnot, 1885
- Didymodon canaliculatus Dixon, 1930
- Didymodon capensis Spreng.
- Didymodon capitatus Dixon ex Sappa & Piovano, 1947
- Didymodon cardotii Zander, 1993
- Didymodon catenulatus Dixon, 1930
- Didymodon ceratodonteus Dixon, 1932
- Didymodon challaense Zander, 1993
- Didymodon citrinus (Hampe) A.Jaeger
- Didymodon constrictus K.Saito, 1975
- Didymodon contortus Herzog, 1916
- Didymodon coquimbensis J.Jiménez & Cano
- Didymodon cordatus Juratzka, 1866
- Didymodon crassicostatus (E.B.Bartram) R.H.Zander
- Didymodon curtus (Hedw.) Arn.
- Didymodon cuspidatus Jaeger, 1869
- Didymodon cyathicarpus (Mont.) Mitt.
- Didymodon cylindricus (Hedw.) Wahlenb.
- Didymodon deciduus Zander, 1993
- Didymodon dieckii (Broth.) Kindb.
- Didymodon ditrichoides (Broth.) X.J.Li & S.He
- Didymodon dubius Paris, 1904
- Didymodon eckeliae Zander, 2001
- Didymodon eckendorfii Potier de la Varde, 1937
- Didymodon epunctatus Jaeger, 1873
- Didymodon erosodenticulatus K.Saito, 1975
- Didymodon erosus J.A.Jiménez & J.Guerra
- Didymodon fallax Zander, 1978
- Didymodon ferrugineus M.O.Hill, 1981
- Didymodon filescens (Hampe) A.Jaeger
- Didymodon filicaulis Cardot, 1910
- Didymodon flaccidus (Harv.) Mitt.
- Didymodon fontanus (Müll.Hal.) Broth.
- Didymodon formosicus Broth.
- Didymodon fragilicuspis Brotherus, 1928
- Didymodon fulvus (Hook.) Schwägr.
- Didymodon funkii Garovaglio, 1840
- Didymodon gaochienii B.C.Tan & Jia Yu, 1997
- Didymodon giganteus Juratzka, 1882
- Didymodon glaucoviridis Brotherus, 1902
- Didymodon glaucus Ryan
- Didymodon godmanianus (Müll.Hal.) E.B.Bartram
- Didymodon gorodkovii (Abramova & I.I.Abramov) Schljakov
- Didymodon grimmioides Duby
- Didymodon guineensis Brotherus & Paris, 1911
- Didymodon gymnostomus Broth.
- Didymodon gymnus Brotherus, 1902
- Didymodon hampei Zander, 1993
- Didymodon hastatus Zander, 1993
- Didymodon haussknechtii Brotherus, 1902
- Didymodon hedysariformis Otnyukova, 1998
- Didymodon hegewaldiorum J.Jiménez & Cano
- Didymodon heribaudii Cardot
- Didymodon herzogii Zander, 1993
- Didymodon hostilis (Herzog) Broth.
- Didymodon humboldtii E.Hegewald & P.Hegewald, 1977
- Didymodon humidus Zander, 1993
- Didymodon icmadophilus (Müll.Hal.) K.Saito
- Didymodon imperfectus Zander, 1993
- Didymodon incrassatolimbatus Cardot, 1909
- Didymodon incrassatus Brotherus, 1902
- Didymodon incurvus J.A.Jiménez & M.J.Cano
- Didymodon insulanus (De Not.) M.O.Hill
- Didymodon insularis Besch.
- Didymodon interruptus Mitt.
- Didymodon inundatus Brotherus, 1902
- Didymodon jackvancei Zander, 1993
- Didymodon jamesonii (Taylor) A.Jaeger
- Didymodon japonicus K.Saito, 1975
- Didymodon johansenii H.Crum, 1969
- Didymodon juniperinus Brotherus, 1902
- Didymodon laevigatus Zander, 1978
- Didymodon lamyanus Thériot, 1932
- Didymodon lapponicus (Hedw.) Mitt.
- Didymodon leskeoides K.Saito, 1975
- Didymodon leucodon (Müll.Hal.) Broth.
- Didymodon lindigii Zander, 1993
- Didymodon lingulatus Brotherus, 1902
- Didymodon littoralis (Mitt.) Kindb.
- Didymodon loeskei Fleischer, 1923
- Didymodon longicaulis (Mitt.) A.Jaeger
- Didymodon lorentzianus Brotherus, 1902
- Didymodon luehmannii Catcheside, 1980
- Didymodon luridus Hornsch.
- Didymodon luridus Spreng.
- Didymodon luzonensis E.B.Bartram
- Didymodon macounii Kindb.
- Didymodon macrophyllus Brotherus, 1916
- Didymodon mamillosus M.O.Hill, 1981
- Didymodon marginatus Zander, 1993
- Didymodon maschalogena Brotherus, 1909
- Didymodon maximus M.O.Hill, 1981
- Didymodon merceyoides Broth.
- Didymodon mexicanus Besch.
- Didymodon microstomus Dixon & Badhw.
- Didymodon microthecius Brotherus, 1902
- Didymodon minusculus Zander, 1993
- Didymodon mittenii Gangulee, 1964
- Didymodon montanus (Mitt.) Broth.
- Didymodon montevidensis Brotherus, 1917
- Didymodon moritzianus Brotherus, 1902
- Didymodon mougeotii (Bruch & Schimp.) Mitt.
- Didymodon murrayae Otnyukova, 2002
- Didymodon neesii Mitten, 1859
- Didymodon neomexicanus (Sull. & Lesq.) Kindb.
- Didymodon nepalensis Brid.
- Didymodon nevadensis Zander, 1995
- Didymodon nicholsonii Culmann, 1907
- Didymodon nigrescens K.Saito, 1975
- Didymodon nitens Liebm.
- Didymodon norrisii Zander, 1999
- Didymodon oblongifolius Hook.
- Didymodon occidentalis Zander, 1978
- Didymodon oedocostatus J.A.Jiménez & M.J.Cano
- Didymodon orbignyanus Brotherus, 1902
- Didymodon orientalis (F.Weber) R.S.Williams
- Didymodon ovatus (Mitt.) A.Jaeger
- Didymodon pallidobasis Li Xing-jiang & Iwatsuki, 2001
- Didymodon papillatus Hook.f. & Wilson
- Didymodon papillinervis (Dixon & Herzog) Demaret
- Didymodon papillosus (Dicks.) Brid.
- Didymodon paramicola (H.Rob.) O.Werner, J.A.Jiménez & Ros
- Didymodon patagonicus Brotherus, 1924
- Didymodon pelichucensis R.S.Williams
- Didymodon perexilis Brotherus, 1902
- Didymodon perobtusus Brotherus, 1928
- Didymodon perrevolutus P.de la Varde
- Didymodon pichinchensis Taylor
- Didymodon planifolius P.de la Varde & Thér.
- Didymodon planotophaceus J.Fröhlich, 1953
- Didymodon platyneurus (Müll.Hal. & Kindb.) M.N.Aziz & Vohra
- Didymodon plicatus (Müll.Hal.) Mont.
- Didymodon polycarpus (Hedw.) Mitt.
- Didymodon polycephalus Montagne, 1845
- Didymodon pottsii Dixon
- Didymodon proscriptus (Hornsch.) Brid.
- Didymodon pruinosus Zander, 1993
- Didymodon pulvinans (Herzog) Brotherus, 1925
- Didymodon ramulosus (Schimp. ex Besch.) Cardot
- Didymodon recurvus (Griff.) Broth.
- Didymodon reflexus Thériot, 1924
- Didymodon reticulatus Gillies ex Greville, 1830
- Didymodon revolutus R.S.Williams, 1913
- Didymodon rigidifolius Dixon
- Didymodon rigidulus Hedwig, 1801
- Didymodon riparius (Austin) Kindb.
- Didymodon rivicola Zander, 1983
- Didymodon rubiginosus Brotherus, 1902
- Didymodon rufescens (Mitt.) Broth.
- Didymodon rufidulus Brotherus, 1902
- Didymodon rupestris (Funck ex Brid.) Wallr.
- Didymodon schilleri Herzog & Thériot, 1933
- Didymodon schimperi (Mont.) Broth.
- Didymodon serrulatus (Hook. & Grev.) Mitt.
- Didymodon sicculus Cano et al., 1996
- Didymodon sinuosus Delogne, 1873
- Didymodon smaragdinus Brid.
- Didymodon soaresii Luisier, 1916
- Didymodon spadiceus Limpricht, 1888
- Didymodon spathulatolinearis Brotherus, 1902
- Didymodon spitsbergensis Dixon ex G.N.Jones
- Didymodon starkeanus Garov.
- Didymodon stenocarpus (Bruch & Schimp.) Mitt.
- Didymodon stenopyxis Cardot, 1909
- Didymodon stewartii Zander, 1993
- Didymodon strictorubellus Dixon, 1942
- Didymodon subalpinum (De Not.) Lorentz
- Didymodon subandreaeoides Zander, 1978
- Didymodon subfontanus Dixon, 1926
- Didymodon subniger (Mitt.) Paris
- Didymodon subrevolutus Brotherus, 1902
- Didymodon subtorquatus Catcheside, 1980
- Didymodon subtriquetrus H.Robinson, 1967
- Didymodon subulatus Schkuhr, 1811
- Didymodon tasmanicus (Hook.f.) Mitt.
- Didymodon taylorii Zander, 1993
- Didymodon tectorum K.Saito, 1975
- Didymodon tenellus R.A.Hedwig ex Bridel, 1827
- Didymodon tenii (Herzog) Broth.
- Didymodon theobaldii Pfeff.
- Didymodon tisserantii P.de la Varde
- Didymodon tomaculosus Corley, 1981
- Didymodon tophaceopsis Zander, 1993
- Didymodon tophaceus Lisa, 1837
- Didymodon torquatus Catcheside, 1980
- Didymodon trachyneuron Kindb.
- Didymodon trivialis J.Guerra, 1987
- Didymodon ulocalyx (Müll.Hal.) A.Jaeger
- Didymodon umbrosus Zander, 1978
- Didymodon uruguayensis Zander, 1993
- Didymodon vinealis Brid
- Didymodon vinealis Zander, 1978
- Didymodon virens (Hedw.) Mitt.
- Didymodon vulcanicus J.A.Jiménez, Hedd. & Frank Müll., 2017
- Didymodon wahlenbergii (Brid.) Mitt.
- Didymodon warnstorfii Paris
- Didymodon waymouthii Zander, 1993
- Didymodon wildii (Broth.) Broth.
- Didymodon wisselii Norris & T.Koponen, 1989
- Didymodon wollei (Austin) Austin, 1877
- Didymodon xanthocarpus Magill, 1979
- Didymodon yunnanensis (Herzog) Broth.
