= Tetracoscinodon =

Scientific classification
- Kingdom: Plantae
- Division: Bryophyta
- Class: Bryopsida
- Subclass: Dicranidae
- Order: Pottiales
- Family: Pottiaceae
- Genus: Tetracoscinodon; R.Br.bis

Genus of mosses

Tetracoscinodon is a genus of mosses belonging to the family Pottiaceae.

The species of this genus are found in New Zealand.

Species:

- Tetracoscinodon irroratus Zander, 1993
