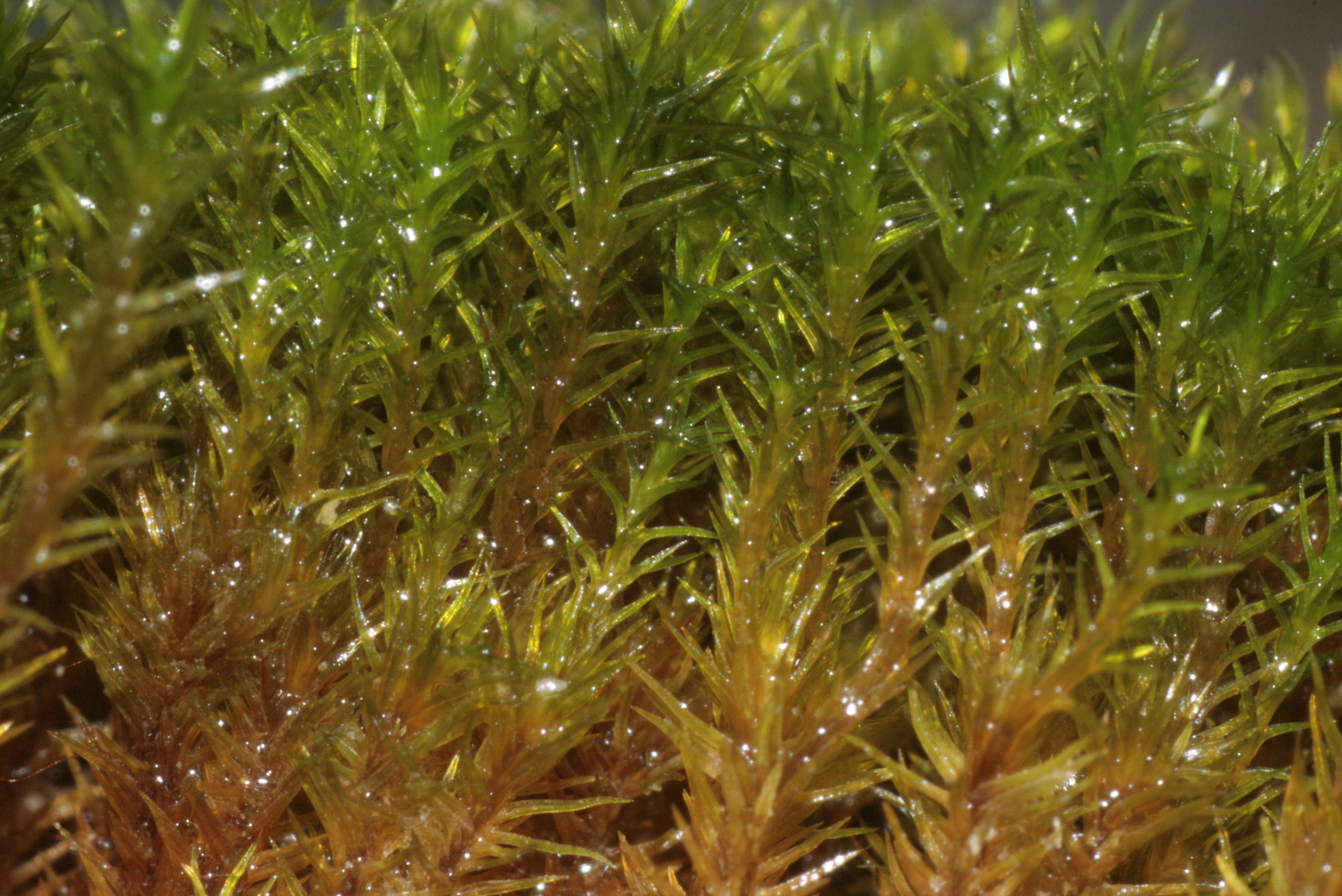
- Hymenostylium revurvirostrum

Scientific classification
- Kingdom: Plantae
- Division: Bryophyta
- Class: Bryopsida
- Subclass: Dicranidae
- Order: Pottiales
- Family: Pottiaceae
- Genus: Hymenostylium; Brid.

= Hymenostylium =

Genus of mosses

Hymenostylium is a genus of mosses belonging to the family Pottiaceae.

Species:

- Hymenostylium annotinum Mitt. ex Dixon
- Hymenostylium aurantiacum Mitt.
- Hymenostylium barbula (Schwägr.) Mitt.
- Hymenostylium crassinervium
- Hymenostylium recurvirostrum (Hedw.) Dixon
