= Chenia (plant) =

Scientific classification
- Kingdom: Plantae
- Division: Bryophyta
- Class: Bryopsida
- Subclass: Dicranidae
- Order: Pottiales
- Family: Pottiaceae
- Genus: Chenia; R.H.Zander

Genus of mosses

Chenia is a genus of mosses belonging to the family Pottiaceae.

The genus name of Chenia is in honour of Pan Chieh Chen (1907–1970), a Chinese botanist (Bryology).

The genus was circumscribed by Richard Henry Zander in Phytologia Vol.65 oon page 424 in 1989.

The genus has cosmopolitan distribution.

The genus contains three species:

- Chenia leptophylla Zander, 1993
- Chenia lorentzii Zander, 1993
- Chenia subobliqua Zander, 1989
