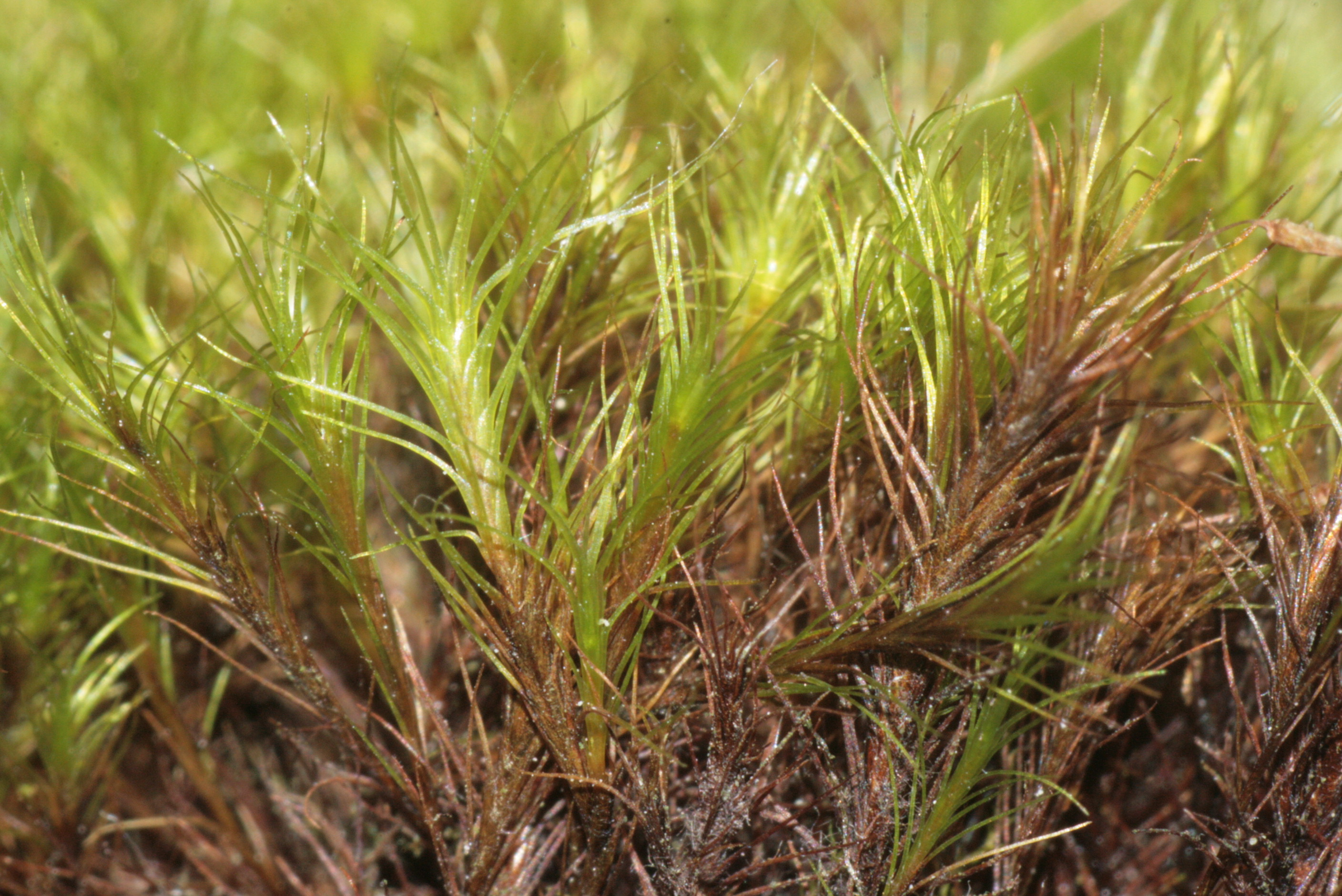
- Distichium capillaceum

Scientific classification
- Kingdom: Plantae
- Division: Bryophyta
- Class: Bryopsida
- Subclass: Dicranidae
- Order: Distichiales; D. Bell & Goffinet, 2023

Families
- Distichiaceae; Timmiellaceae

= Distichiales =

Order of haplolepideous mosses

Distichiales is an order of haplolepideous mosses in the subclass Dicranidae.
