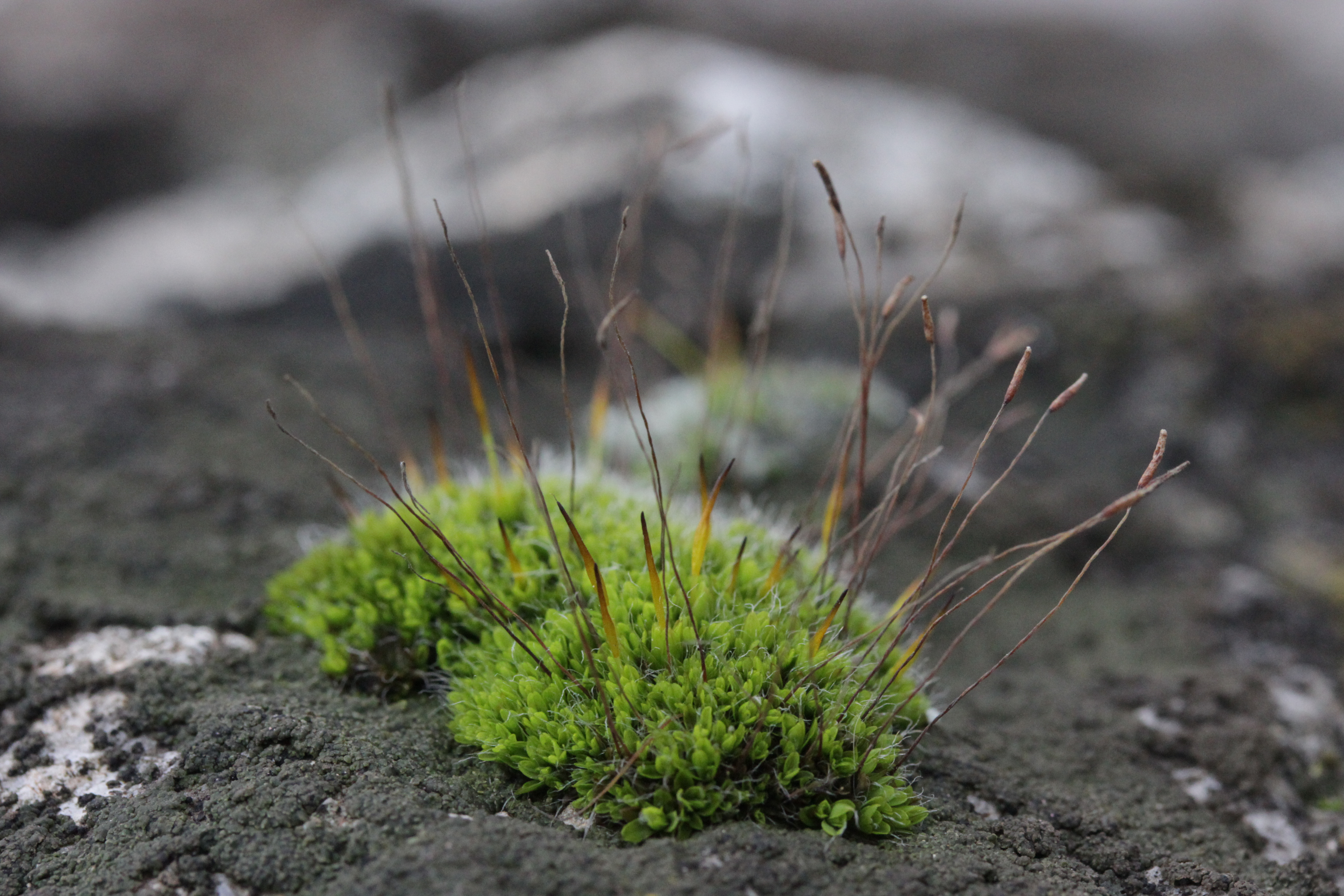
- Tortula muralis

Scientific classification
- Kingdom: Plantae
- Division: Bryophyta
- Class: Bryopsida
- Subclass: Dicranidae
- Order: Pottiales
- Family: Pottiaceae; Schimp.

= Pottiaceae =

Family of mosses

The Pottiaceae are a family of mosses. They form the most numerous moss family known, containing nearly 1500 species or more than 10% of the 10,000 to 15,000 moss species known.

== Genera ==
The family has four subfamilies and 83 genera.

- Subfamily Trichostomoideae
  - Bryoceuthospora
  - Calymperastrum
  - Calyptopogon
  - Chionoloma
  - Eucladium
  - Leptobarbula
  - Neophoenix
  - Pachyneuropsis
  - Pleurochaete
  - Pottiopsis
  - Pseudosymblepharis
  - Quaesticula
  - Streptocalypta
  - Tetracoscinodon
  - Tetrapterum
  - Tortella Lindb.
  - Trachycarpidium
  - Trichostomum
  - Oxystegus
  - Tuerckheima Broth.
  - Uleobryum
  - Weissia
  - Weissiodicranum
- Subfamily Barbuloideae
  - Anoectangium
  - Barbula
  - Bellibarbula
  - Bryoerythrophyllum
  - Cinclidotus
  - Dialytrichia
  - Didymodon (e.g. Didymodon tomaculosus)
  - Erythrophyllopsis
  - Ganguleea
  - Gertrudiella
  - Gymnostomum
  - Gymnostomiella
  - Gyroweisia
  - Hymenostyliella
  - Hymenostylium
  - Hyophila
  - Hyophiladelphus
  - Koponobryum
  - Leptodontiella
  - Leptodontium
  - Luisierella
  - Mironia
  - Molendoa
  - Plaubelia
  - Pseudocrossidium
  - Reimersia
  - Rhexophyllum
  - Sarconeurum (e.g. Sarconeurum glaciale)
  - Splachnobryum
  - Streptotrichum
  - Teniolophora
  - Trachyodontium
  - Triquetrella
  - Weisiopsis
- Subfamily Pottioideae
  - Acaulon
  - Aloina
  - Aloinella Cardot
  - Chenia
  - Crossidium
  - Crumia
  - Dolotortula
  - Globulinella
  - Hennediella
  - Hilpertia
  - Ludorugbya
  - Microbryum
  - Microcrossidium
  - Phascopsis
  - Pterygoneurum
  - Sagenotortula
  - Saitobryum
  - Stegonia
  - Stonea R. H. Zander
  - Streptopogon
  - Syntrichia
  - Tortula
  - Willia
- Subfamily Merceyoideae
  - Scopelophila

The GBIF also lists Morinia Cardot, Saitoa, Sebillea M.Bizot, 1974, and Spruceella Müll.Hal., 1900 but with no subfamily details.

Subfamily Timmielloideae (and its two genera of Timmiella and Luisierella) have been transferred to a new family Timmiellaceae, due to molecular phylogenetic analysis in 2014.
