= List of Sphagnum species =

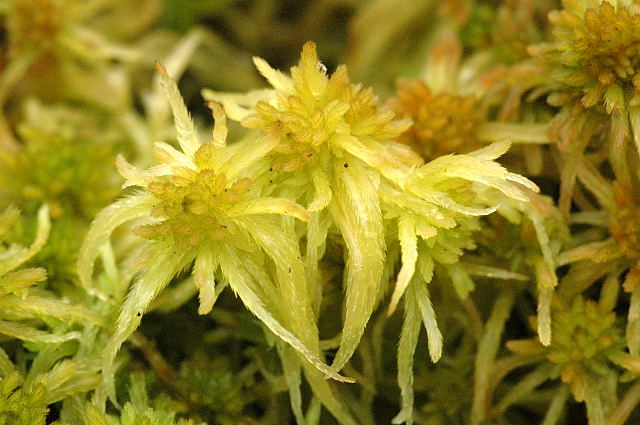
Sphagnum fimbriatum

As of September 2025, World Flora Online accepts 382 species in the peat-moss genus Sphagnum, along with 330 synonyms and 96 unplaced.

== List ==
=== A ===
- Sphagnum aciphyllum Müll. Hal.
- Sphagnum acutifolioides Warnst.
- Sphagnum acutirameum H.A. Crum
- Sphagnum aequalipunctatum H.A. Crum
- Sphagnum aequiporosum Warnst.
- Sphagnum affine Renauld & Cardot
- Sphagnum africanum Welw. & Duby
- Sphagnum alaskense R.E. Andrus & Janssens
- Sphagnum alegrense Warnst.
- Sphagnum amazonense H.A. Crum
- Sphagnum amazonicum H.A. Crum & W.R. Buck
- Sphagnum amoenoides H.A. Crum
- Sphagnum amoenum Warnst.
- Sphagnum andersonianum R.E. Andrus
- Sphagnum andrusii (H.A. Crum) Flatberg
- Sphagnum angermanicum Melin
- Sphagnum angustifolium (Russow) C.E.O. Jensen
- Sphagnum annulatum H. Lindb. ex Warnst.
- Sphagnum antarense Wijk & Zanten
- Sphagnum antioquiense H.A. Crum
- Sphagnum aongstroemii C. Hartm.
- Sphagnum apopenneysii B.C. Tan, Ignatov, Ignatova & Mishler
- Sphagnum arcticum Flatberg & Frisvoll
- Sphagnum atlanticum R.E. Andrus
- Sphagnum atroligneum H.A. Crum
- Sphagnum austinii Sull.
- Sphagnum australe Mitt.
- Sphagnum austro-americanum H.A. Crum
- Sphagnum azuayense H.A. Crum

=== B ===
- Sphagnum balslevii H.A. Crum
- Sphagnum balticum (Russow) C.E.O. Jensen
- Sphagnum barclayae H.A. Crum
- Sphagnum bartlettianum Warnst.
- Sphagnum beothuk R.E. Andrus
- Sphagnum bergianum R.E. Andrus
- Sphagnum beringiense A.J. Shaw, R.E. Andrus & B. Shaw
- Sphagnum billbuckii H.A. Crum
- Sphagnum boliviae Warnst.
- Sphagnum boomii H.A. Crum
- Sphagnum boyacanum H.A. Crum
- Sphagnum brachybolax Müll. Hal. ex Warnst.
- Sphagnum brasiliense Warnst.
- Sphagnum breedlovei H.A. Crum
- Sphagnum brevirameum Hampe

=== C ===
- Sphagnum calymmatophyllum Warnst. & Cardot
- Sphagnum capense Hornsch.
- Sphagnum capillifolium (Ehrh.) Hedw.
- Sphagnum carolinianum R.E. Andrus
- Sphagnum cavernulosum Flatberg & Whinam
- Sphagnum centrale C.E.O. Jensen
- Sphagnum ceylonicum Mitt. ex Warnst.
- Sphagnum chi-chiense H.A. Crum
- Sphagnum cleefii H.A. Crum
- Sphagnum comosum Müll. Hal.
- Sphagnum compactum DC.
- Sphagnum complanatum Flatberg & Whinam
- Sphagnum concinnum (Berggr.) Flatberg
- Sphagnum condensatum Brid.
- Sphagnum conflatum Müll. Hal. ex Warnst.
- Sphagnum connectens Warnst. & Cardot
- Sphagnum contortulum H.A. Crum
- Sphagnum contortum Schultz
- Sphagnum costae H.A. Crum
- Sphagnum cribriforme H.A. Crum
- Sphagnum cribrosum Lindb.
- Sphagnum cristatum Hampe
- Sphagnum crumii Schäf.-Verw.
- Sphagnum cuculliforme H.A. Crum
- Sphagnum cundinamarcanum H.A. Crum
- Sphagnum curicuriariense H.A. Crum & W.R. Buck
- Sphagnum curvatulum H.A. Crum
- Sphagnum cuspidatulum Müll. Hal.
- Sphagnum cuspidatum Ehrh. ex Hoffm.
- Sphagnum cyclocladum Warnst.
- Sphagnum cyclophyllum Sull. & Lesq.

=== D ===
- Sphagnum davidii Warnst.
- Sphagnum delamboyense Schäf.-Verw.
- Sphagnum denticulatum Brid.
- Sphagnum diabolicum A.J. Shaw, Aguero & Nieto-Lugilde
- Sphagnum diblastoides H.A. Crum
- Sphagnum dicladum Warnst.
- Sphagnum dimorphophyllum H.A. Crum & W.R. Buck
- Sphagnum divinum Flatberg & K. Hassel
- Sphagnum divisum H.A. Crum
- Sphagnum dominii Kavina

=== E ===
- Sphagnum efibrillosum A.L. Andrews
- Sphagnum engelii H.A. Crum
- Sphagnum ericetorum Brid.
- Sphagnum exile H.A. Crum
- Sphagnum exquisitum H.A. Crum

=== F ===
- Sphagnum falcatulum Besch.
- Sphagnum fallax (H. Klinggr.) H. Klinggr.
- Sphagnum fimbriatum Wilson
- Sphagnum fitzgeraldii Renauld
- Sphagnum flaccidum Besch.
- Sphagnum flavicaule Warnst.
- Sphagnum flavicomans (Cardot) Warnst.
- Sphagnum flexuosum Dozy & Molk.
- Sphagnum fontanum Müll. Hal.
- Sphagnum frahmii H.A. Crum
- Sphagnum fraudulentum H.A. Crum
- Sphagnum funkiae H.A. Crum
- Sphagnum fuscovinosum Seppelt & H.A. Crum
- Sphagnum fuscum (Schimp.) H. Klinggr.

=== G ===
- Sphagnum garysmithii H.A. Crum
- Sphagnum geraisense H.A. Crum
- Sphagnum girgensohnii Russow
- Sphagnum globicephalum Müll. Hal. ex Warnst.
- Sphagnum gomezii H.A. Crum
- Sphagnum gracilescens Hampe ex Müll. Hal.
- Sphagnum griseum Warnst.
- Sphagnum guwassanense Warnst.

=== H ===
- Sphagnum hampeanum Venturi
- Sphagnum harleyi H.A. Crum
- Sphagnum hegewaldii H.A. Crum
- Sphagnum helenicum Warnst.
- Sphagnum henryense Warnst.
- Sphagnum hertelianum H.A. Crum
- Sphagnum herteri H.A. Crum
- Sphagnum homophyllum H.A. Crum
- Sphagnum huilense H.A. Crum
- Sphagnum hypnoides (A. Braun ex Bruch) Brid.

=== I ===
- Sphagnum imbricatum Hornsch. ex Russow
- Sphagnum imperforatum H.A. Crum
- Sphagnum incertum Warnst. & Cardot
- Sphagnum incommodum H.A. Crum
- Sphagnum incundum Flatberg & K. Hassel
- Sphagnum inexspectatum Flatberg
- Sphagnum inundatum Russow
- Sphagnum irwinii H.A. Crum
- Sphagnum islei Warnst.
- Sphagnum itabense H.A. Crum & W.R. Buck

=== J ===
- Sphagnum jensenii H. Lindb.
- Sphagnum juliforme H.A. Crum
- Sphagnum junghuhnianum Dozy & Molk.

=== K ===
- Sphagnum kenaiense R.E. Andrus
- Sphagnum khasianum Mitt.
- Sphagnum kushiroense H. Suzuki

=== L ===
- Sphagnum laegaardii H.A. Crum
- Sphagnum lankesteri H.A. Crum
- Sphagnum laxirameum H.A. Crum
- Sphagnum laxulum H.A. Crum
- Sphagnum lenense H. Lindb. ex Pohle
- Sphagnum leonii H.A. Crum
- Sphagnum lescurii Sull.
- Sphagnum lewisii H.A. Crum
- Sphagnum liesneri H.A. Crum
- Sphagnum limbatum Mitt.
- Sphagnum lindbergii Schimp.
- Sphagnum lojense H.A. Crum
- Sphagnum longicomosum Müll. Hal. ex Warnst.
- Sphagnum longistolo Müll. Hal.
- Sphagnum luetzelburgii H.K.G. Paul ex H.A. Crum
- Sphagnum luzonense Warnst.
- Sphagnum lydiae Flatberg & K. Hassel

=== M ===
- Sphagnum macrophyllum Bernh. ex Brid.
- Sphagnum maegdefraui H. Suzuki
- Sphagnum magellanicum Brid.
- Sphagnum magistri H.A. Crum
- Sphagnum magniae A.J. Shaw, Aguero & Nieto-Lugilde
- Sphagnum magniporosum Flatberg, K. Hassel & Prestø
- Sphagnum majus (Russow) C.E.O. Jensen
- Sphagnum mcqueenii R.E. Andrus
- Sphagnum medium Limpr.
- Sphagnum mendocinum Sull. & Lesq.
- Sphagnum meridense (Hampe) Müll. Hal.
- Sphagnum microcarpum Warnst.
- Sphagnum microcuspidatum H.A. Crum
- Sphagnum microporum Warnst. ex Cardot
- Sphagnum minutulum Müll. Hal. & Warnst.
- Sphagnum mirabile Müll. Hal. & Warnst.
- Sphagnum mirum Flatberg & Thingsgaard
- Sphagnum mississippiense R.E. Andrus
- Sphagnum missouricum Warnst. & Cardot
- Sphagnum miyabeanum Warnst.
- Sphagnum molle Sull.
- Sphagnum moronum H.A. Crum
- Sphagnum mucronatum Bruch & Schimp. ex Edmondston
- Sphagnum multifibrosum X.J. Li & M. Zang
- Sphagnum multiporosum H.A. Crum

=== N ===
- Sphagnum negrense Mitt.
- Sphagnum nepalense H. Suzuki
- Sphagnum nitidulum Warnst.
- Sphagnum noryungasense H.A. Crum
- Sphagnum novo-guineense M. Fleisch. & Warnst.
- Sphagnum novo-zelandicum Mitt.

=== O ===
- Sphagnum obliquefibrosum H.A. Crum
- Sphagnum obtusum Warnst.
- Sphagnum olafii Flatberg
- Sphagnum oregonense R.E. Andrus
- Sphagnum orientale L.I. Savicz
- Sphagnum ornatum H.A. Crum
- Sphagnum ovatum Hampe

=== P ===
- Sphagnum pacificum Flatberg
- Sphagnum pallens Warnst. & Cardot
- Sphagnum palustre L.
- Sphagnum papillosum Lindb.
- Sphagnum paranense H.A. Crum
- Sphagnum parcoramosum H.A. Crum
- Sphagnum perfoliatum L.I. Savicz
- Sphagnum perichaetiale Hampe
- Sphagnum perrieri Thér.
- Sphagnum planifolium Müll. Hal.
- Sphagnum platyphylloides Warnst.
- Sphagnum platyphyllum (Lindb. ex Braithw.) Sull. ex Warnst.
- Sphagnum pluriporosum H.A. Crum
- Sphagnum poasense H.A. Crum
- Sphagnum portoricense Hampe
- Sphagnum priceae H.A. Crum
- Sphagnum pseudoramulinum H.A. Crum
- Sphagnum pulchrum (Lindb.) Warnst.
- Sphagnum pungifolium X.J. Li
- Sphagnum pycnocladulum Müll. Hal.
- Sphagnum pylaesii Brid.

=== Q ===
- Sphagnum quinquefarium (Lindb.) Warnst.

=== R ===
- Sphagnum ramulinum Warnst.
- Sphagnum reclinatum H.A. Crum
- Sphagnum recurvum P. Beauv.
- Sphagnum reichardtii Hampe
- Sphagnum richardsianum H.A. Crum
- Sphagnum rio-negrense H.A. Crum
- Sphagnum riparium Ångstr.
- Sphagnum ripense H.A. Crum & W.R. Buck
- Sphagnum robinsonii Warnst.
- Sphagnum roraimense Warnst.
- Sphagnum rotundatum Müll. Hal. & Warnst.
- Sphagnum rotundifolium Müll. Hal. & Warnst.
- Sphagnum rubellum Wilson
- Sphagnum rubiginosum Flatberg
- Sphagnum rubroflexuosum R.E. Andrus
- Sphagnum russowii Warnst.
- Sphagnum rutenbergii Müll. Hal.

=== S ===
- Sphagnum sancto-josephense H.A. Crum & Crosby
- Sphagnum sanguinale Warnst.
- Sphagnum santanderense H.A. Crum
- Sphagnum schwabeanum H.K.G. Paul
- Sphagnum sehnemii H.A. Crum
- Sphagnum septatum Warnst.
- Sphagnum simplex Fife
- Sphagnum simplicicaulis H.A. Crum
- Sphagnum sipmanii H.A. Crum
- Sphagnum sitchense R.E. Andrus
- Sphagnum skyense Flatberg
- Sphagnum slooveri A. Eddy
- Sphagnum sonsonense H.A. Crum
- Sphagnum sparsum Hampe
- Sphagnum sphaericum H. Lindb.
- Sphagnum splendens Maass
- Sphagnum squarrosum Crome
- Sphagnum steerei R.E. Andrus
- Sphagnum strictum Sull.
- Sphagnum subacutifolium Schimp.
- Sphagnum subaequifolium Hampe
- Sphagnum subbalticum Warnst.
- Sphagnum subfulvum Sjörs
- Sphagnum subhomophyllum H.A. Crum
- Sphagnum submedium Warnst.
- Sphagnum subnitens Russow & Warnst.
- Sphagnum subobesum Warnst.
- Sphagnum subovalifolium Müll. Hal. & Warnst.
- Sphagnum subrufescens Warnst.
- Sphagnum subsecundoides H.A. Crum & W.R. Buck
- Sphagnum subsecundum Nees
- Sphagnum subtile (Russow) Warnst.
- Sphagnum sucrei H.A. Crum
- Sphagnum sumapazense H.A. Crum

=== T ===
- Sphagnum tabuleirense O. Yano & H.A. Crum
- Sphagnum talbotianum R.E. Andrus
- Sphagnum tenellum (Brid.) Bory
- Sphagnum tenerum Sull. & Lesq.
- Sphagnum teres (Schimp.) Ångstr. ex Hartm.
- Sphagnum tescorum Flatberg
- Sphagnum torreyanum Sull.
- Sphagnum tosaense Warnst.
- Sphagnum trinitense Müll. Hal.
- Sphagnum trirameum H.A. Crum
- Sphagnum triseriporum (H. Suzuki) A.J. Shaw
- Sphagnum troendelagicum Flatberg
- Sphagnum trollii H.A. Crum
- Sphagnum truncatum Hornsch.
- Sphagnum tumidulum Besch.
- Sphagnum tundrae Flatberg
- Sphagnum turgens Warnst.
- Sphagnum turgescens Warnst.
- Sphagnum typicum Meyl. ex Wijk, Margad. & Florsch.

=== U ===
- Sphagnum uruguayense H.A. Crum

=== V ===
- Sphagnum venustum Flatberg
- Sphagnum versiporum Warnst.
- Sphagnum violascens Müll. Hal.
- Sphagnum vitalii H.A. Crum

=== W ===
- Sphagnum warnstorfii Russow
- Sphagnum wheeleri Müll. Hal.
- Sphagnum wilfii H.A. Crum
- Sphagnum wulfianum Girg.

== Formerly accepted ==
- Sphagnum inretortum H.A. Crum (now placed in genus Eosphagnum in Ambuchananiaceae)
- Sphagnum leucobryoides T. Yamag., Seppelt & Z. Iwats. (now placed in genus Ambuchanania in family Ambuchananiaceae)
- Sphagnum sericeum Müll. Hal. (transferred to genus Flatbergium in family Flatbergiaceae)
