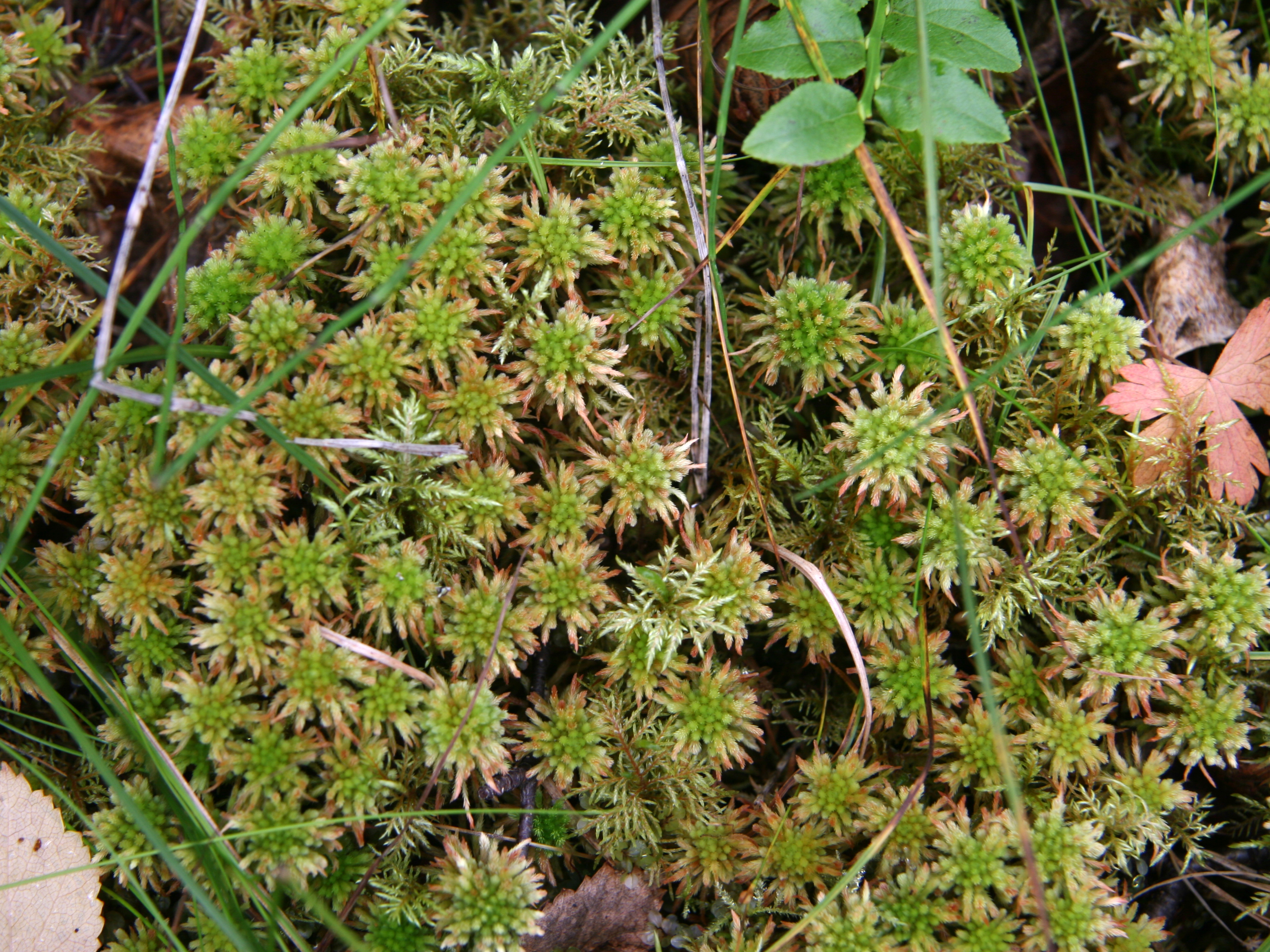

Conservation status
- Least Concern (IUCN 3.1) (Europe regional assessment)

- Secure (NatureServe)

Scientific classification
- Kingdom: Plantae
- Division: Bryophyta
- Class: Sphagnopsida
- Order: Sphagnales
- Family: Sphagnaceae
- Genus: Sphagnum
- Species: S. wulfianum

Binomial name
- Sphagnum wulfianum Girg.

Synonyms
- List: Sphagnum pycnocladum Ångstr.; Sphagnum wulfii Lindb.; Sphagnum wulfianum f. congestum Russow; Sphagnum wulfianum var. fuscescens Warnst.; Sphagnum wulfianum f. pumilum (Warnst. ex Zick.) Warnst.; Sphagnum wulfianum f. remotum Russow; Sphagnum wulfianum f. robustum Warnst.; Sphagnum wulfianum var. squarrosulum Russow ex Warnst.; Sphagnum wulfianum var. squarrulosum Russow; Sphagnum wulfianum var. versicolor Warnst.; Sphagnum wulfianum var. viride Warnst.; Sphagnum wulfii var. squarrosulum Braithw.; Sphagnum wulfianum var. pumilum Warnst. ex Zick.; Sphagnum wulfianum subf. squarrulosum (Russow) Warnst.

= Sphagnum wulfianum =

Species of moss

Sphagnum wulfianum, commonly known as Wulf's peatmoss, is a species of moss belonging to the family Sphagnaceae. It has a circumboreal distribution, occurring primarily in moist boreal forest environments across Eurasia and North America, with rare occurrences in Arctic tundra regions. The species is morphologically distinctive among peat mosses, characterised by having six to twelve branches per fascicle, a unique feature in the genus. First described in 1860 from Estonia, it typically grows in boggy mineral-rich spruce forests and at the borders of mires, forming small carpets and hummocks. While the species has a large geographic range and stable overall population trends in Europe, it faces regional conservation challenges, particularly at its range edges, where it is considered endangered in several countries due to habitat degradation from peatland drainage, forestry, and agriculture. Genetic studies indicate remarkably low genetic diversity throughout its range, suggesting high rates of gene flow across large distances despite infrequent spore production.

== Systematics ==
=== Historical taxonomy ===
Sphagnum wulfianum was first described by Gustav Karl Girgensohn in 1860 from specimens collected near Tartu, Estonia (then part of Livland in the Russian Empire). Girgensohn discovered the species in 1847 in a swampy forest at Techlefer manor (now Tähtevere) and named it after von Wulf, the manor's owner.

The lectotype specimen, designated in 2007, was collected by Girgensohn on 21 March 1847, and is housed in the Institute of Agriculture and Environment of the Estonian University of Life Sciences (TAA). This specimen is notable for bearing sporophytes and includes Girgensohn's original notes describing key characteristics of the species, including its distinctive feature of having 8–12 branches per fascicle. Several syntypes and other original specimens collected by Girgensohn are preserved in various herbaria including Helsinki (H), St. Petersburg (LE), and Tartu (TAM).

A few years after Girgensohn's original German description, Edmund Russow published an additional Latin description in 1865 in response to criticism about lacking histological details in the original description. The type locality at Techlefer/Tähtevere has since been destroyed due to drainage and urban development, and the species has become extinct at this site. Despite its loss at the type locality, S. wulfianum remains widely but sparsely distributed throughout the boreal zone.

=== Classification ===
Sphagnum wulfianum was historically placed in its own monospecific section Polyclada within the genus Sphagnum. However, molecular phylogenetics studies indicate it belongs within or sister to section Acutifolia. While earlier studies suggested it might be nested within Acutifolia, more extensive molecular sampling indicates it may be more closely related to section Squarrosa, though its precise phylogenetic position remains ambiguous – it could be sister to Squarrosa, sister to Acutifolia, or sister to both sections combined.

The species is morphologically unique among Sphagnum species in having six to twelve branches per fascicle (branch cluster), with at least three of these being spreading branches. This distinctive feature led to its original classification in its own section, but molecular evidence indicates this characteristic evolved within one of the major Sphagnum lineages rather than representing an early diverging lineage.

== Description ==
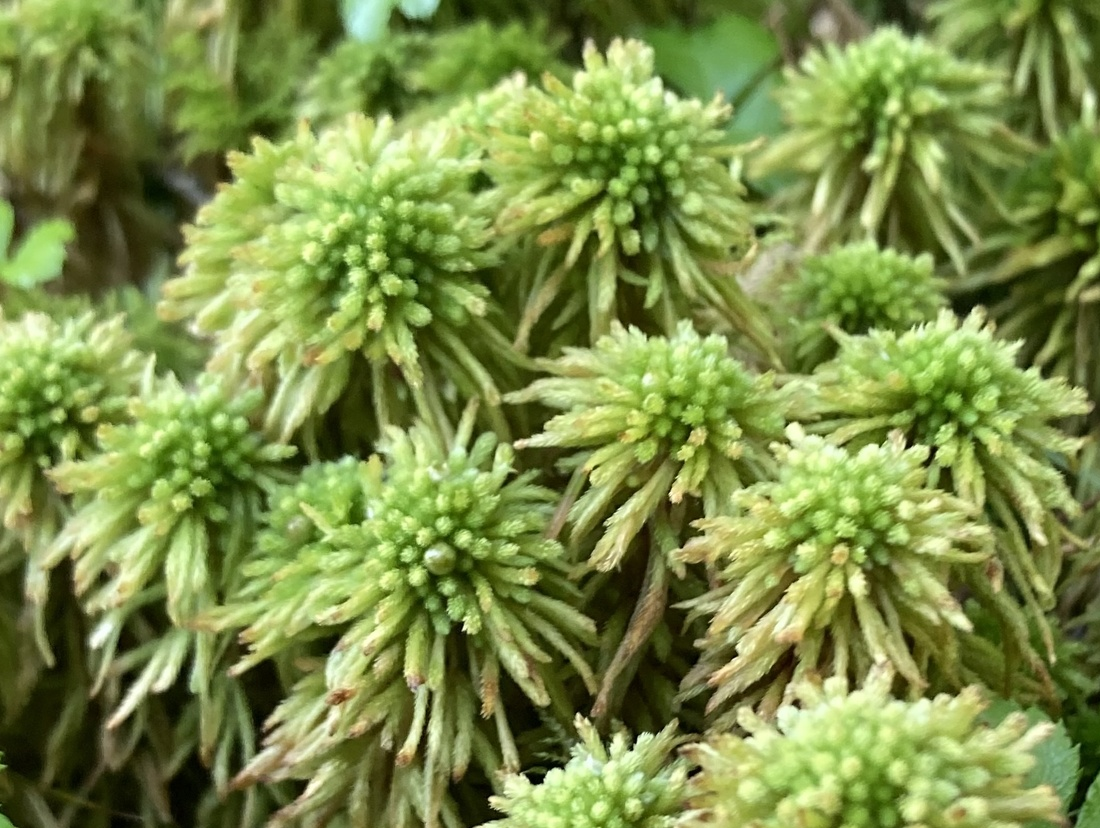
Dense hemispherical capitulum of Sphagnum wulfianum showing its characteristic multiple branches per fascicle, a unique feature among Sphagnum species

Sphagnum wulfianum is a medium-sized moss species with several distinctive morphological features. The species is characterised by having six to twelve branches per fascicle (branch cluster), with at least three of these being spreading branches – a unique feature among Sphagnum species. The plant is typically green in colour, rarely becoming light brown even when growing in full sunlight. It has a very rigid, dark stem and a dense capitulum (the cluster of branches at the stem apex) that varies from slightly convex to hemispherical. The stem leaves are oblong-triangular in shape and measure 0.75–1.0 mm in length.

The species is distinctive and easily recognised in the field by its characteristic features, particularly the high number of branches per fascicle, large erect dense moss cap, and distinctive brown stem. Under microscopic examination, it has unique diagnostic features in its branch and stem leaves, particularly the pattern of pores on water-bearing cells in branch leaves. These pores have distinctive rings around them that occur almost along the entire length of the leaf, a feature that distinguishes it from similar species like S. warnstorfii, which only has such rings in the top part of the branch leaf. Its appearance is distinctly different from other Sphagnum species, making it relatively straightforward to identify once familiar with its characteristics.

== Distribution ==
Sphagnum wulfianum has a circumboreal distribution. In Europe, it is primarily found in Fennoscandia, where it has its main European population centre, and Russia, including Asian Russia, with additional scattered populations in the Baltic states, eastern Poland, and Romania, where it is considered one of the rarest Sphagnum species. The species reaches its westernmost European limit at the Atlantic coast of Norway in the Åfjord Municipality of Central Norway. The species occurs from sea level up to 1,100 m (3,600 ft) in elevation.

In North America, S. wulfianum is found throughout the continent, and populations have also been recorded in West Greenland and northeast China. The presence of this species in regions at the edge of its range may represent relatively recent colonisation rather than relict populations from glacial periods, as suggested by studies in northeastern Poland showing a lack of fossil remains in peat deposits. While S. wulfianum is primarily a boreal forest species, it has also been documented in the Arctic tundra zone, though such occurrences are rare. Systematic analysis of herbarium specimens and distribution records indicates that tundra habitats represent less than 0.5% of the species' documented locations. These tundra occurrences are geographically limited to specific regions: the Yamal Peninsula, Taz Peninsula, Taymyr Peninsula, and the portion of the Bolshezemelskaya Tundra adjacent to the Polar Urals. In contrast, the species is absent from the tundras of Yakutia, Chukotka, and the mountainous tundras of Scandinavia.

The species' restricted tundra distribution pattern appears to be linked to historical vegetation changes. Paleoecological evidence suggests that S. wulfianum in these southern tundra regions may be a relict from the Holocene climatic optimum, when these areas were covered by forest vegetation. The current tundra populations persist in areas that were formerly forested during warmer periods, while the species is absent from regions that lacked forest cover during the Holocene. It is fairly common in Finland and eastern middle Sweden, but becomes increasingly rare towards its western and southern range limits in Europe. In the Baltic states, it is relatively common in Estonia and Latvia but rare in Lithuania.

== Habitat and ecology ==
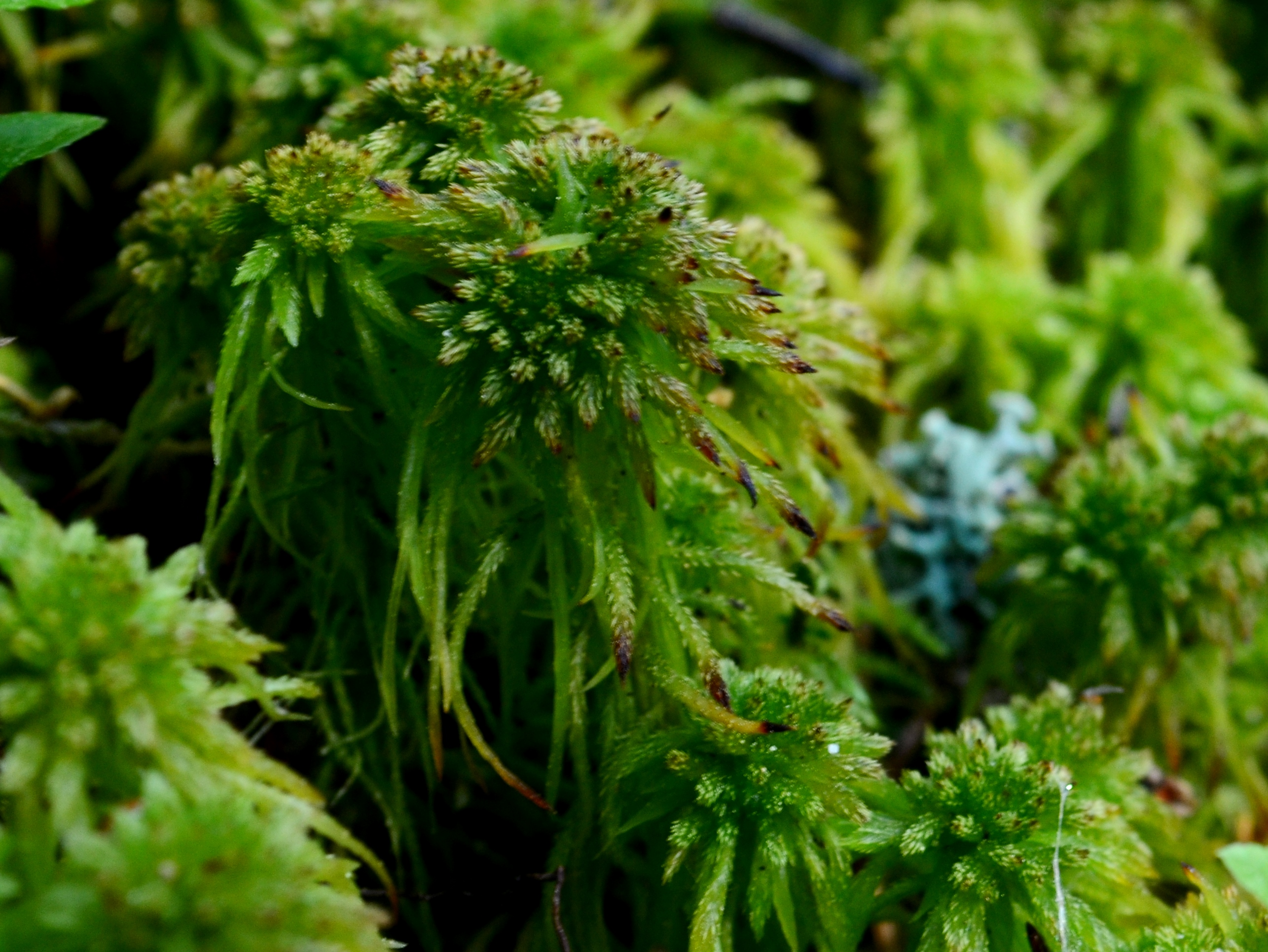
Sphagnum wulfianum in Lithuania, showing its dark stem and multiple spreading branches, with characteristic dense green capitula visible at the tips

The species typically grows in moist boreal forest environments, particularly in boggy mineral-rich spruce forests at the borders of mires, and rarely in open habitats. It may also occur in moist birch and pine forests, and in Greenland, it has been found growing in treeless, arctic vegetation, demonstrating its ability to survive in arctic environments. Within these forest environments, S. wulfianum grows directly on the ground or over fallen tree trunks, typically forming small isolated cushions. When rarely found in open peatlands, it prefers drier microhabitats such as stumps.

Though it has a wide distribution area, it consistently occurs in small and distantly scattered populations. In Estonia, where the species was first described, it has been found at about 20 localities, with populations typically consisting of only a few patches approximately 1–2 m (3 ft 3 in – 6 ft 7 in) in diameter.

Sphagnum wulfianum commonly grows alongside other Sphagnum species, including S. centrale, S. girgensohnii, S. russowii, and S. squarrosum. Research has shown that its growth can be affected by neighbouring species, with reduced height growth but increased weight gain when growing in mixed species communities compared to monocultures. The species appears to be a relatively weak competitor compared to other Sphagnum species growing in the same habitat. It typically forms small carpets and hummocks in conifer swamp habitats, especially in moist spruce forests, where it grows on damp mineral soil, peat, and peat hummocks near tree bases. Less commonly, it can be found in more open conditions in dwarf shrub communities of the sub-arctic zone or in overgrown felling areas.

== Population genetics ==
Sphagnum wulfianum shows remarkably low genetic diversity throughout its range compared to other Sphagnum species, with only four polymorphic loci out of 18 studied. The species has two main genetic groups that are relatively evenly distributed across the Northern Hemisphere, though only one genetic group is found in the Pacific Northwest of North America. This genetic uniformity suggests high rates of gene flow across large distances, despite the species' infrequent spore production.

Genetic studies have shown that European populations of S. wulfianum likely colonised northern Europe after the Last Glacial Maximum, rather than surviving in glacial refugia. The species shows relatively low genetic variation within populations but high differentiation between populations. Despite its infrequent spore production, the species appears capable of long-distance dispersal, as evidenced by the widespread distribution of shared genetic types from Norway to Russia.

== Conservation ==
Sphagnum wulfianum is listed as Least Concern (LC) across Europe and the European Union due to its large geographic range and stable overall population trends. However, the species faces regional conservation challenges, particularly at the edges of its range. It is classified as Endangered (EN) in Norway, Romania, and Ukraine, Vulnerable (VU) in Poland and Lithuania, and Near Threatened (NT) in Estonia. The primary threats to the species include habitat degradation from peatland drainage for forestry and agriculture, reduction of groundwater levels, peatland fires, and peat harvesting. Some populations are protected within nature reserves, and in Estonia, the species receives legal protection due to habitat degradation concerns.

== See also ==
- List of Sphagnum species
