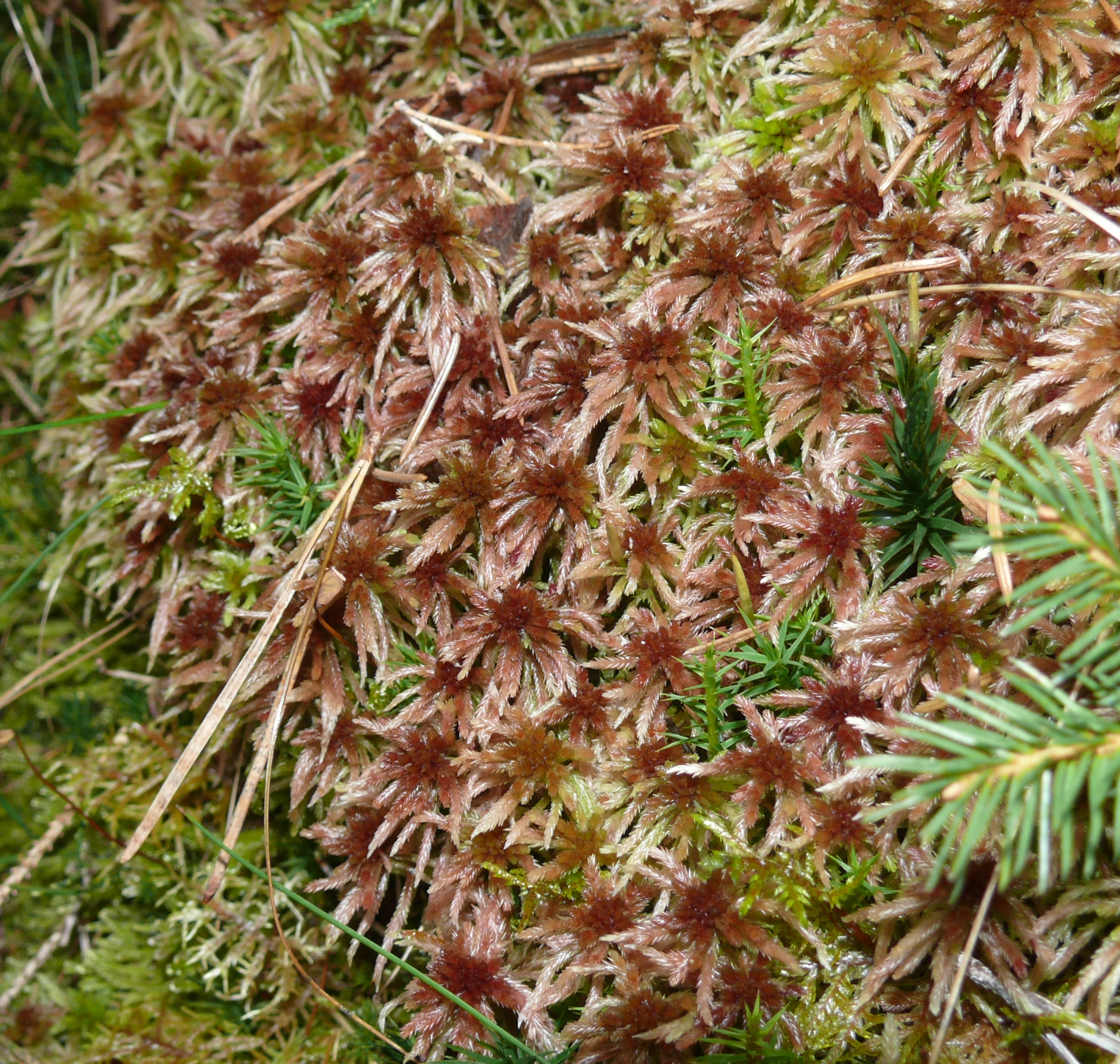

Conservation status
- Least Concern (IUCN 3.1) (Europe regional assessment)

- Secure (NatureServe)

Scientific classification
- Kingdom: Plantae
- Division: Bryophyta
- Class: Sphagnopsida
- Order: Sphagnales
- Family: Sphagnaceae
- Genus: Sphagnum
- Species: S. quinquefarium

Binomial name
- Sphagnum quinquefarium (Lindb. ex Braithw.) Warnst.

Synonyms
- List: Sphagnum acutifolium subsp. quinquefarium (Lindb.) Hérib.; Sphagnum acutifolium var. flavicaule Warnst.; Sphagnum acutifolium var. gerstenbergeri Warnst.; Sphagnum acutifolium var. laxum Russow; Sphagnum acutifolium var. quinquefarium Lindb.; Sphagnum acutiforme var. silesiacum Warnst.; Sphagnum plumulosum subsp. quinquefarium (Lindb.) Bott.; Sphagnum plumulosum var. gerstenbergeri (Warnst.) Röll; Sphagnum plumulosum var. laxum (Russow) Röll; Sphagnum plumulosum var. microphyllum Röll; Sphagnum plumulosum var. pusillum (Röll) Röll; Sphagnum plumulosum var. quinquefarium (Lindb.) Röll; Sphagnum plumulosum var. silesiacum (Warnst.) Röll; Sphagnum quinquefarium var. capitatum Grav. ex Röll; Sphagnum quinquefarium var. gerstenbergeri (Warnst.) Cardot; Sphagnum quinquefarium var. laxum (Russow) Röll; Sphagnum quinquefarium var. pallens (Warnst.) Warnst.; Sphagnum quinquefarium var. roseum Warnst.; Sphagnum quinquefarium var. silesiacum (Warnst.) Cardot; Sphagnum quinquefarium var. virescens Warnst.; Sphagnum quinquefarium var. viride Warnst.; Sphagnum robustum var. pseudopatulum (Röll) H. Schmidt; Sphagnum warnstorfii var. pallens (Warnst.) Röll; Sphagnum warnstorfii var. pseudo-patulum Röll; Sphagnum schofieldii H.A. Crum; Sphagnum plumulosum f. pusillum Röll; Sphagnum quinquefarium f. versicolor Russow; Sphagnum pseudopatulum (Röll) Röll; Sphagnum nemoreum var. quinquefarium (Lindb.) Venturi & Bott.; Sphagnum acutifolium var. pallens Warnst.; Sphagnum acutifolium var. silesiacum Warnst.; Sphagnum girgensohnii var. pallens (Warnst.) Cardot; Sphagnum nemoreum var. pallens (Warnst.) Broth. & Saelan; Sphagnum plumulosum f. brachycladum Röll; Sphagnum plumulosum f. compactum Röll; Sphagnum plumulosum f. flagellare Röll; Sphagnum plumulosum f. gracile Röll; Sphagnum plumulosum f. molluscum Röll; Sphagnum plumulosum f. strictiforme Röll; Sphagnum plumulosum f. strictum Röll; Sphagnum pseudopatulum var. gracile Röll; Sphagnum pseudopatulum var. laxum Röll; Sphagnum pseudopatulum var. pulchrum Röll; Sphagnum quinquefarium var. brachycladum (Röll) Röll; Sphagnum quinquefarium var. compactum (Röll) Röll; Sphagnum quinquefarium f. dasycladum Wheldon; Sphagnum quinquefarium var. densum Röll ex Bott.; Sphagnum quinquefarium var. flagellare (Röll) Röll; Sphagnum quinquefarium var. flavicaule (Warnst.) Plam.; Sphagnum quinquefarium var. flavum Warnst.; Sphagnum quinquefarium var. fuscoflavum Warnst.; Sphagnum quinquefarium var. gracile (Röll) Röll; Sphagnum quinquefarium f. mastigocladum Wheldon; Sphagnum quinquefarium var. molle C.E.O. Jensen; Sphagnum quinquefarium var. molluscum (Röll) Röll; Sphagnum quinquefarium var. patulum Röll ex Bott.; Sphagnum quinquefarium var. pseudoalpinum Latzel; Sphagnum quinquefarium var. pseudopatulum (Röll) Cardot; Sphagnum quinquefarium var. pusillum (Röll) Bott.; Sphagnum quinquefarium var. seriatum Venturi; Sphagnum quinquefarium var. squarrosulum (Röll) Röll; Sphagnum quinquefarium var. stachyodes Hamm.; Sphagnum quinquefarium var. strictiforme (Röll) Röll; Sphagnum quinquefarium var. strictum (Röll) Röll; Sphagnum quinquefarium var. submersum (Röll) Bott.; Sphagnum acutiforme var. tenellum Schlieph.; Sphagnum plumulosum var. brachycladum (Röll) Röll; Sphagnum plumulosum var. compactum (Röll) Röll; Sphagnum plumulosum var. gracile (Röll) Röll; Sphagnum plumulosum var. molluscum (Röll) Röll; Sphagnum plumulosum f. squarrosulum Röll; Sphagnum plumulosum var. strictiforme (Röll) Röll; Sphagnum plumulosum var. strictum (Röll) Röll; Sphagnum quinquefarium var. flavicaule (Warnst.) Röll; Sphagnum quinquefarium var. versicolor (Russow) Warnst.; Sphagnum acutifolium f. strictum Warnst.; Sphagnum plumulosum var. submersum Röll; Sphagnum plumulosum f. gracile Röll; Sphagnum quinquefarium subf. orthocladum Pichl.

= Sphagnum quinquefarium =

Species of moss

Sphagnum quinquefarium, the five-ranked bog-moss, is a species of peat moss belonging to the family Sphagnaceae. It is characterised by its distinctive five-ranked leaf arrangement and three spreading branches per fascicle. It typically grows in loose, upright formations in damp, shaded woodlands rather than in peatlands, preferring areas with high atmospheric humidity. The medium-sized moss has a pale green to yellowish-green colouring, often marked with pink or red patches, and can be distinguished from similar species by its prismatic branch appearance and parallel-sided stem leaves. Found throughout the Northern Hemisphere, it is most abundant in oceanic and sub-oceanic regions, particularly in northwestern Europe and the Carpathian Mountains, with populations also occurring in eastern Asia and coastal North America. While commonly hybridising with S. capillifolium in areas where their ranges overlap, the species maintains its distinctness through different habitat preferences. Conservation status varies significantly across its range, from being common in some regions to vulnerable and legally protected in others, such as Hungary.

== Taxonomy ==
Sphagnum quinquefarium was first formally described by Robert Braithwaite in 1880 as Sphagnum acutifolium var. quinquefarium. It was later elevated to species status by Carl Warnstorf in 1886. The specific epithet quinquefarium refers to the distinctive five-ranked arrangement of its leaves.

The taxonomic history of the species involves some complexity. As early as 1873, Sextus Otto Lindberg had used the name S. acutifolium var. quinquefarium on specimen labels, though this usage was not formally published. The species has also been known historically under several other names, including Sphagnum plumulosum var. quinquefarium and Sphagnum bartlettianum Warnstorf (1911). A historical note involves specimens from Ireland in the syntype material, which showed atypical characteristics somewhat resembling S. warnstorfii. However, despite this early taxonomic confusion, the current application of the name S. quinquefarium is well established.

== Description ==
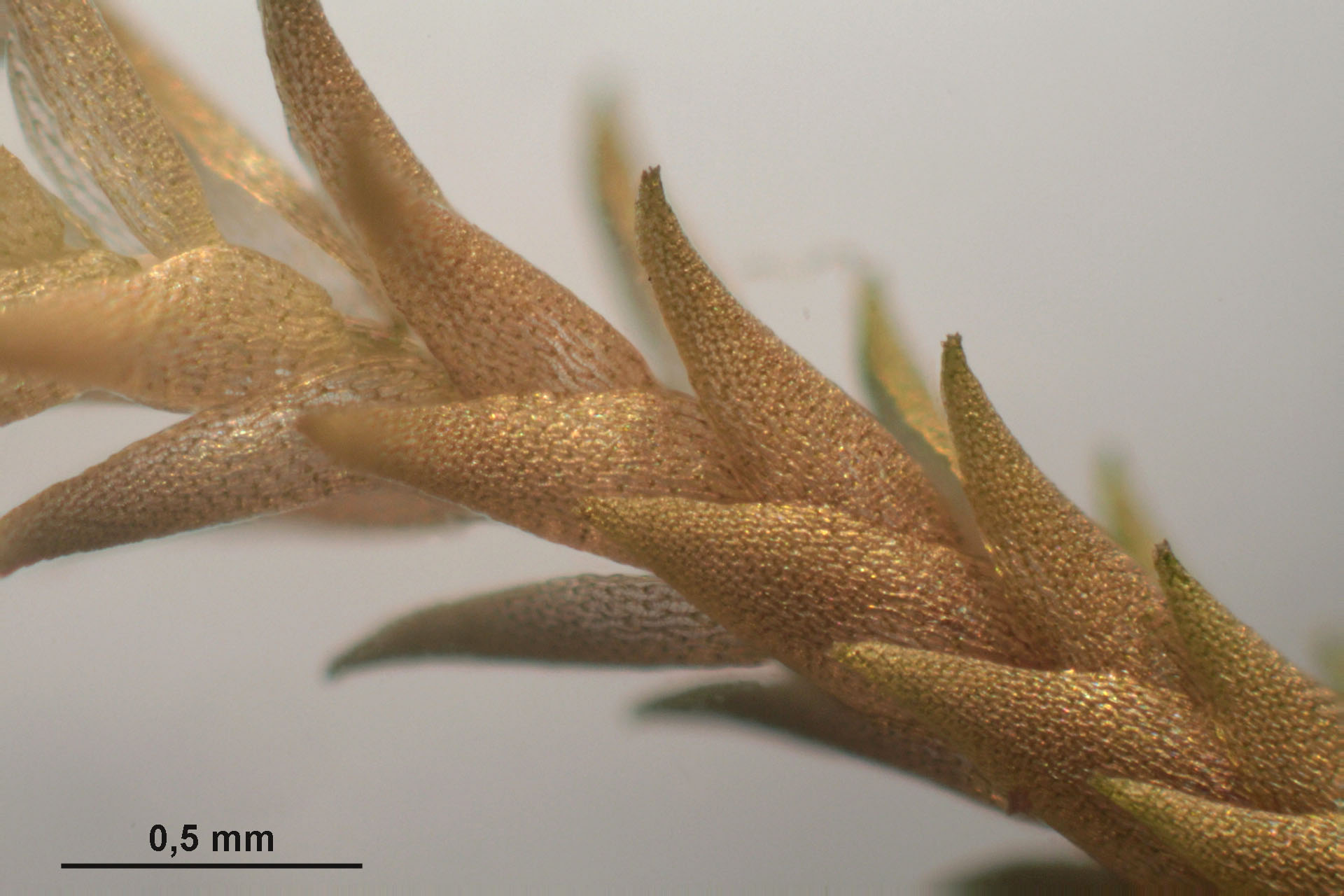
Five-ranked leaf arrangement of Sphagnum quinquefarium under microscope (scale bar: 0.5 mm)

Sphagnum quinquefarium is a medium-sized peat moss that typically grows in loose, upright formations rather than dense clusters. The plant has pale green to yellowish-green colouring, often marked with pink or pale red patches, though occasionally the entire plant may appear red. The capitula (plant tops) have a distinctive wide triangular form, measuring only 1 mm in length. The plant's stem is slender (0.5–0.8 mm in diameter) and surrounded by 3–4 layers of transparent (hyaline) cells, with a well-developed inner core that appears yellowish to yellow-brown, sometimes showing reddish zones. This core is protected by an outer layer of cells that occasionally feature small pores.

A distinctive characteristic of S. quinquefarium is its branch arrangement. Unlike most other species in the Sphagnaceae, which typically have two spreading branches per fascicle, S. quinquefarium consistently has three spreading branches. The branches grow in clusters (fascicles) spaced apart along the stem, with each cluster typically containing 4–5 branches of two different types. Each cluster features three spreading branches that extend 15–25 mm and taper toward their tips, accompanied by one or two hanging (pendent) branches that are at least as long as the spreading ones. This three-branched characteristic helps distinguish it from the similar-looking Sphagnum capillifolium, which usually has only two spreading branches per fascicle. Additional distinguishing features include its flatter capitulum and stem leaves with parallel-sided basal portions.

The plant has two types of leaves. The stem leaves stand upright, measuring 1.1–1.3 mm in length, and are triangle-shaped to tongue-like. These leaves have a distinct border that widens at the base and contain transparent cells with fine internal fibres (fibrils) on one side. The branch leaves, which give the species its name "quinquefarium," arrange themselves in five distinct rows. These lance-shaped leaves measure 1.3–1.5 mm long and about 0.5 mm wide, with rolled-in edges at the tip. They contain specialised transparent cells with ringed pores and attach to the branches at roughly 40-degree angles, creating a distinctive prismatic appearance.

Sphagnum quinquefarium is monoicous, meaning individual plants have both male and female reproductive structures, though they are often found in a single-sex state. When present, the male reproductive structures (antheridia) are enclosed in red or pink modified leaves. The female reproductive structures develop into large, sheathing leaves up to 4.8 mm long. When the plant successfully reproduces, it produces spores measuring 21–24 micrometres in diameter with a slightly rough surface. Spore capsules are commonly found in some locations.

== Distribution and habitat ==
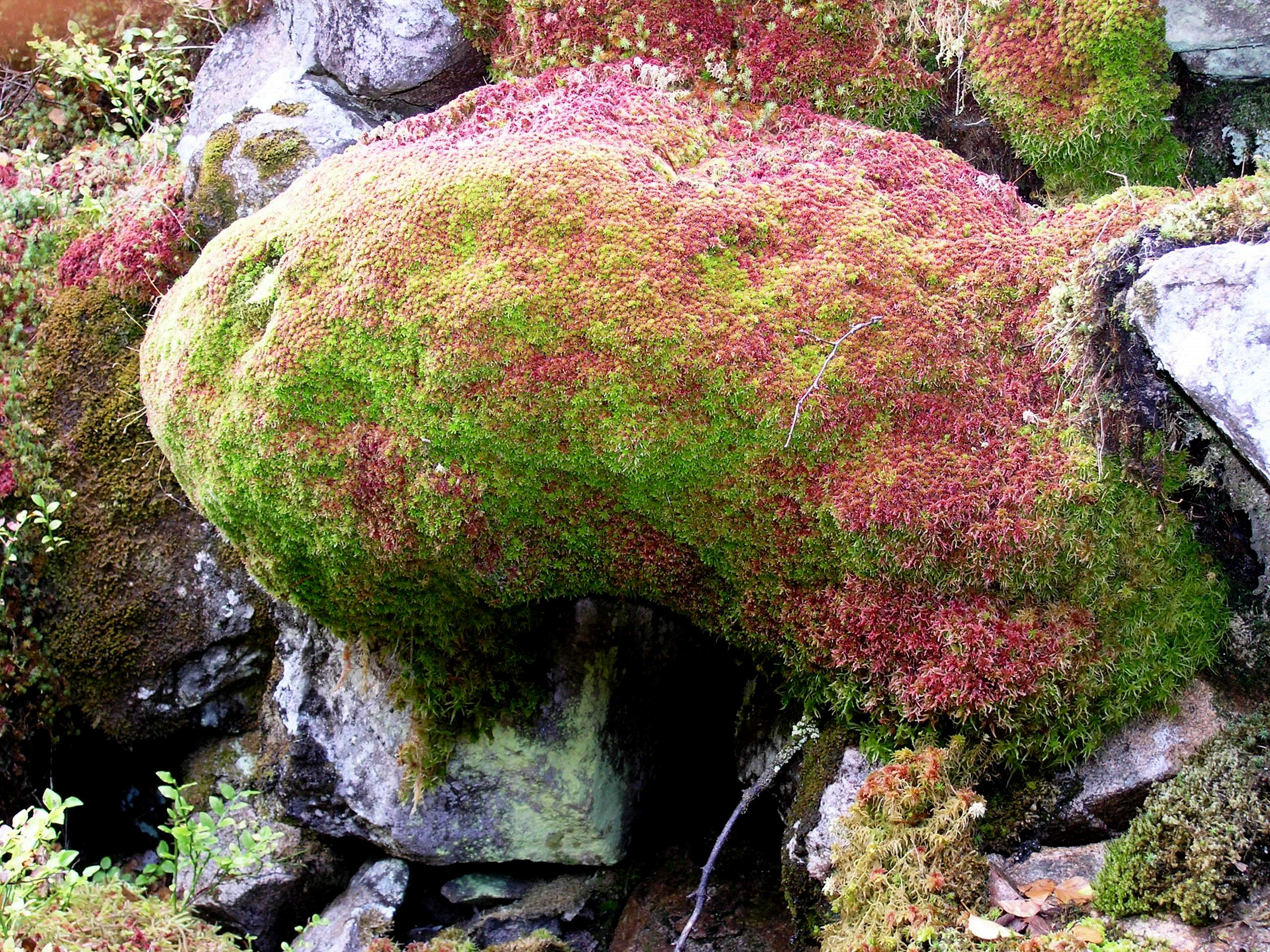
Sphagnum quinquefarium (red patches) growing alongside S. capillifolium in a condensation mire in the Vosges mountains, France. The species shows characteristic patches of red colouration mixed with green.

Unlike most peat mosses, Sphagnum quinquefarium rarely grows in peatlands. Instead, it favours damp hillsides where it grows beneath dwarf shrubs or in open woodlands, particularly those dominated by birch (Betula) trees. The species shows a strong preference for upland areas and well-drained spruce forests, and can also be found growing in acidophilous beech forests and on wet andesite rocks. The species thrives in areas of high humidity and is frequently found growing alongside other peat mosses, particularly Sphagnum capillifolium var. capillifolium and S. palustre. Its common companion plants include heather (Calluna vulgaris), birch trees, and various species of bilberry and cranberry (Vaccinium species).

Sphagnum quinquefarium shows a distinctly oceanic distribution pattern, being most abundant in regions with strong maritime influence. In Europe, it reaches its greatest abundance in the northwestern regions, particularly in southern Scandinavia, though it is notably absent from the northernmost areas. In Central and Eastern Europe, the species is especially abundant in the Carpathian Mountain range. It is very common throughout the High Tatras of Slovakia and the Romanian Carpathians, where it occurs across numerous mountain ranges including the Maramureș, Călimani, and Făgăraș Mountains. The species is also well-established in Ukraine, particularly in Kárpátalja and the Eastern Beskids mountains. In the Balkan Region, it has been documented in Croatia around Zagreb and in the Papuk mountains, though it is absent from Serbia.

The species extends southward through montane areas, reaching as far as Italy, the former Yugoslavia, Romania, and the Pyrenees. In the British Isles, it shows a distinctive pattern of distribution, being absent from southeastern Britain while occurring locally in northern England, Scotland, Wales, and Ireland. In the Alps, particularly in Switzerland, the species occurs in the pre-alpine zone at elevations ranging from 450–1,900 m (1,480–6,230 ft) above sea level. In more continental regions, the species is typically restricted to upland areas. Beyond Europe, S. quinquefarium has a wide global distribution, being found in eastern Asia and along both the Atlantic and Pacific coastal regions of North America. It prefers oceanic and sub-oceanic climates with high atmospheric humidity.

== Hybridisation ==
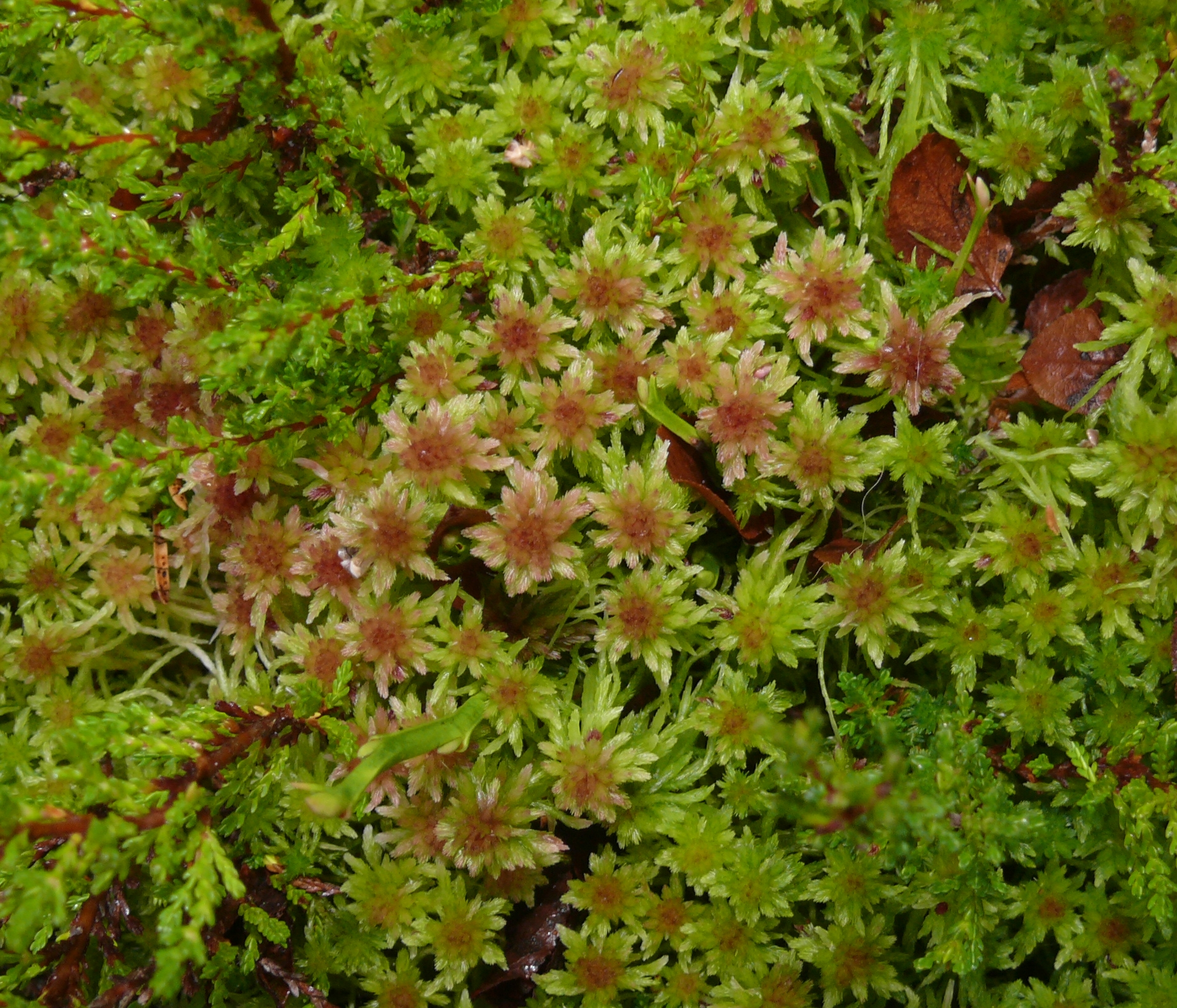
Sphagnum capillifolium (pictured) can form hybrids with S. quinquefarium where they co-occur.

Sphagnum quinquefarium is known to hybridise with the related species S. capillifolium where their ranges overlap. The two species are typically well-differentiated morphologically but can produce hybrid plants when growing together. While S. quinquefarium prefers shaded and permanently moist conifer forests, S. capillifolium typically grows in more open and drier habitats like scattered pine forests or open heaths. However, the species occasionally occur together, particularly in intermediate habitats.

When hybridisation occurs between these species, the resulting plants may show various combinations of parental characteristics rather than being purely intermediate in form. Hybrid plants can be identified through a combination of morphological features and genetic markers. While S. quinquefarium is typically bisexual (having both male and female reproductive structures), hybrids tend to express primarily male reproductive structures. Research suggests that in hybridisation events, S. quinquefarium typically acts as the female parent. The persistence of hybrid plants in mixed populations suggests that hybridisation may play a role in the evolution of these species. However, several factors help maintain species distinctness, including different habitat preferences and geographical distributions that limit areas of contact.

== Conservation ==
Sphagnum quinquefarium faces varying conservation challenges across its range. At a European level, the species is assessed as a least-concern species by the IUCN, with a large and stable population estimated to occupy approximately 4,000 km^{2} (1,500 sq mi) across an extent of occurrence of about 8.6 million km². While no major threats have been identified across most of its range, and no broad conservation measures are currently required, the species shows marked regional differences in abundance and vulnerability. In Hungary and Estonia, for example, the species is legally protected and has been designated as "Vulnerable" on their national Red Lists. In Hungary specifically, each individual plant has been assigned a specific ecological value under national regulations that reflects its conservation significance. The species is also included in the Red Data Book of European Bryophytes, indicating conservation concern at the continental level.

While it is rare and threatened in some regions like Hungary, where it is known from only a few localities, it maintains robust populations in other areas, particularly in the Carpathian Mountains. The population trend is considered stable across most of its range, and the species is well-represented within protected areas. This variation in population status presents unique challenges for conservation management, requiring different approaches in different regions. Conservation efforts are particularly important in areas where the species occurs in isolated or fragmented populations, as these may be more vulnerable to local environmental changes. Monitoring of known populations is essential to track changes in distribution and abundance, especially in regions where the species is rare or declining.

Unlike many other threatened bryophytes, S. quinquefarium is not currently impacted by commercial exploitation, as the species is not utilised or traded. Its preference for relatively dry, well-drained habitats rather than vulnerable peatland environments may contribute to its generally secure conservation status across most of its range.

== See also ==
- List of Sphagnum species
