= Sphagnum platyphyllum =

Conservation status
- Least Concern (IUCN 3.1)

Scientific classification
- Kingdom: Plantae
- Division: Bryophyta
- Class: Sphagnopsida
- Order: Sphagnales
- Family: Sphagnaceae
- Genus: Sphagnum
- Species: S. platyphyllum

Binomial name
- Sphagnum platyphyllum (Lindb.) Warnst.

Species of moss

Sphagnum platyphyllum, the flat-leaved bogmoss, is a species of moss in the family Sphagnaceae. It is a circumpolar peat moss found in arctic and subarctic regions of Europe and Asia, with populations also occurring in North America. The species typically grows in loose mats in wet, moderately nutrient-rich environments, particularly in areas dominated by sedges and locations that experience seasonal flooding. First described as a variety in 1875 and elevated to species status in 1884, it belongs to the subgenus Subsecunda within the "Pacific Rim clade". While most populations are haploid, the species shows evidence of a complex evolutionary history, including rare allodiploid populations. Although widely distributed and classified as a least-concern species globally, it faces varying levels of conservation concern across its range, being critically endangered in several European countries due to habitat degradation, peat extraction, and climate change. The species is distinctive among peat mosses for its poorly developed capitula with protruding stem buds, and its dioecious reproduction, with male plants and spore-producing structures being rare in many regions.

== Taxonomy ==
Sphagnum platyphyllum has a complex taxonomic history. The species was first described as a variety, S. laricinum var. platyphyllum, by Robert Braithwaite in 1875. The earliest valid publication of the epithet platyphyllum is attributed to Braithwaite, not Sextus Otto Lindberg, although Lindberg was the first to use the epithet in the same combination. Carl Friedrich Warnstorf elevated it to species status in 1884, though he did not provide a full description of the species at that time.

The taxonomic status of S. platyphyllum has been subject to debate, even in Fennoscandia where the species is relatively common. It is particularly notable for its relationship with S. contortum, from which it can be distinguished by its characteristic features of distribution and ecology. Intermediate forms between these two species are generally considered to be either stunted forms of S. platyphyllum or robust, straight-leaved modifications of S. contortum. While these species can appear similar, they are distinctly different from each other, and herbarium specimens rarely present identification difficulties.

It belongs to the subgenus Subsecunda, specifically within what researchers term the "Pacific Rim clade" - a group of species distributed around the North Pacific basin. The species has a complex evolutionary history. While most populations are gametophytically haploid (having a single set of chromosomes in the dominant life phase), allodiploid plants with fixed heterozygosity have been documented in northern Quebec. The species shows ambiguous phylogenetic relationships with other members of the Pacific Rim clade, possibly reflecting ancient hybridisation events in its evolutionary past.

Several synonyms have been recorded for this species, including:

Sphagnum laricinum var. platyphyllum Braithw.
Sphagnum platyphyllum n.sp.? vel var. Sph. neglecti Sull.
Sphagnum isophyllum Russow
Sphagnum auriculatum auct., non Schimp. 1857

== Description ==
Sphagnum platyphyllum is a species of peat moss that typically grows in a loose, spreading manner. The plants display varying colours, most commonly appearing in dull shades of pale green to olive-green, sometimes showing purple tinges, and rarely appearing yellowish-brown. Unlike many other peat mosses, this species has poorly developed capitula (the dense cluster of branches at the plant's tip) with distinctive large, oval stem buds protruding from them.

The plant's growth pattern is characterised by somewhat widely spaced clusters of branches (called fascicles), which typically contain three or fewer branches each. These branches are relatively short with blunt ends, with usually one branch being slightly weaker and hanging downward, though otherwise similar to its spreading companions. Rarely, specimens may be found without any branch clusters at all.

The stem is relatively delicate, measuring up to 0.9 mm in diameter. It is surrounded by a protective layer of cells (the cortex) that is typically two cells thick, though this can vary between one and three layers in places. When stained for microscopic examination, these outer cortical cells often reveal a single large pore or thinned area in their walls. The central part of the stem (internal cylinder) is pale to light brown in colour, never developing the dark or blackish-brown hue seen in some related species.

The leaves found on the stem are notably large, either matching or exceeding the size of the branch leaves, and have a spatula-like oval shape with a strongly curved surface. These leaves have rounded tips that show slight wear, and are bordered by a narrow band of different cells. Similarly structured branch leaves measure 1.4–2.2 mm long by 1.1–1.3 mm wide, and their arrangement gives the branches a swollen appearance.

When examined microscopically, the leaves reveal a structure of two cell types: photosynthetic cells and larger hyaline cells (clear, water-storage cells). The hyaline cells are uniformly sized but relatively small compared to the overall leaf size, measuring 15.0–20.0 (sometimes up to 25.0) by 110–150 μm in the middle portion of the leaf. These cells feature tiny pores (2.0–3.0 μm in diameter) scattered along their walls.

Sphagnum platyphyllum is dioecious, meaning male and female reproductive structures occur on separate plants. Male plants are rarely found in Europe, and capsules (spore-producing structures) are very rare, having never been recorded in Britain. When present, the spores measure approximately 33 μm in diameter.

== Habitat and distribution ==
Sphagnum platyphyllum typically grows in loose mats in wet environments that are moderately nutrient-rich (mesotrophic) to slightly nutrient-enriched (mildly eutrophic). The species can be found either submerged or growing close to the water surface. It shows a particular affinity for areas dominated by sedges (Carex species) and locations that experience seasonal flooding, such as the margins of pools, rivers, and lakes, as well as in fens. In these habitats, it commonly grows alongside common reed (Phragmites australis), rushes (Juncus species), reedmace (Typha species), and the brown moss Drepanocladus revolvens. Notably, it rarely occurs with other species of Sphagnum. The species can occasionally be found growing in pools or water channels over mineral-based soils.

The species has a circumpolar distribution, meaning it is found in a band around the Earth in arctic and sub-arctic regions of Europe and Asia. In North America, it is uncommon in western and central regions but extends southward along the eastern seaboard as far as Alabama and Louisiana. Throughout Europe, the species shows a predominantly north-eastern distribution pattern, reaching its greatest abundance in Scandinavia whilst extending as far south as Portugal and Bulgaria. While generally a lowland to subalpine species, it tends to occur at progressively higher elevations in the southern parts of its range. Its recorded altitudinal range is from sea level to 2,200 m above sea level .

In the British Isles, Sphagnum platyphyllum is scarce. It has been recorded from only a few sites: several locations in Wales, north-west England and western Scotland, and just a single known site in Ireland. This limited distribution is particularly noteworthy given the species' broader European range.

== Conservation ==
Despite its wide distribution, Sphagnum platyphyllum faces varying levels of conservation concern across its range. While the species is categorised as a least-concern species (LC) both in Europe as a whole and within the European Union specifically, it faces significant challenges in several regions. The species maintains stable populations in Scandinavia, particularly in Sweden and Finland, but is considerably rarer elsewhere in its range.

The species faces several primary threats. These include the degradation of mire ecosystems through human development, peat extraction activities, habitat fragmentation, and changes in groundwater levels resulting from drainage operations. Climate change has also been identified as a threat to the species' survival.

The conservation status of S. platyphyllum varies considerably by country. It is listed as Critically Endangered in the Czech Republic, Slovakia, Luxembourg, and the Netherlands, where it was once thought extinct before being rediscovered in 2007. The species is classified as Vulnerable in Hungary, Serbia, and Slovenia, while it is considered Near Threatened in Ireland, Romania, and Northern Ireland. In Poland, it is listed as rare.

Several known populations occur within protected areas, providing some degree of habitat security. However, even in these protected locations, the species can face challenges from broader environmental changes. The overall European population is estimated to occupy an area of more than 4,500 km² (3,000 km² within the EU), with the total extent of occurrence estimated at around 10 million km² across Europe.
