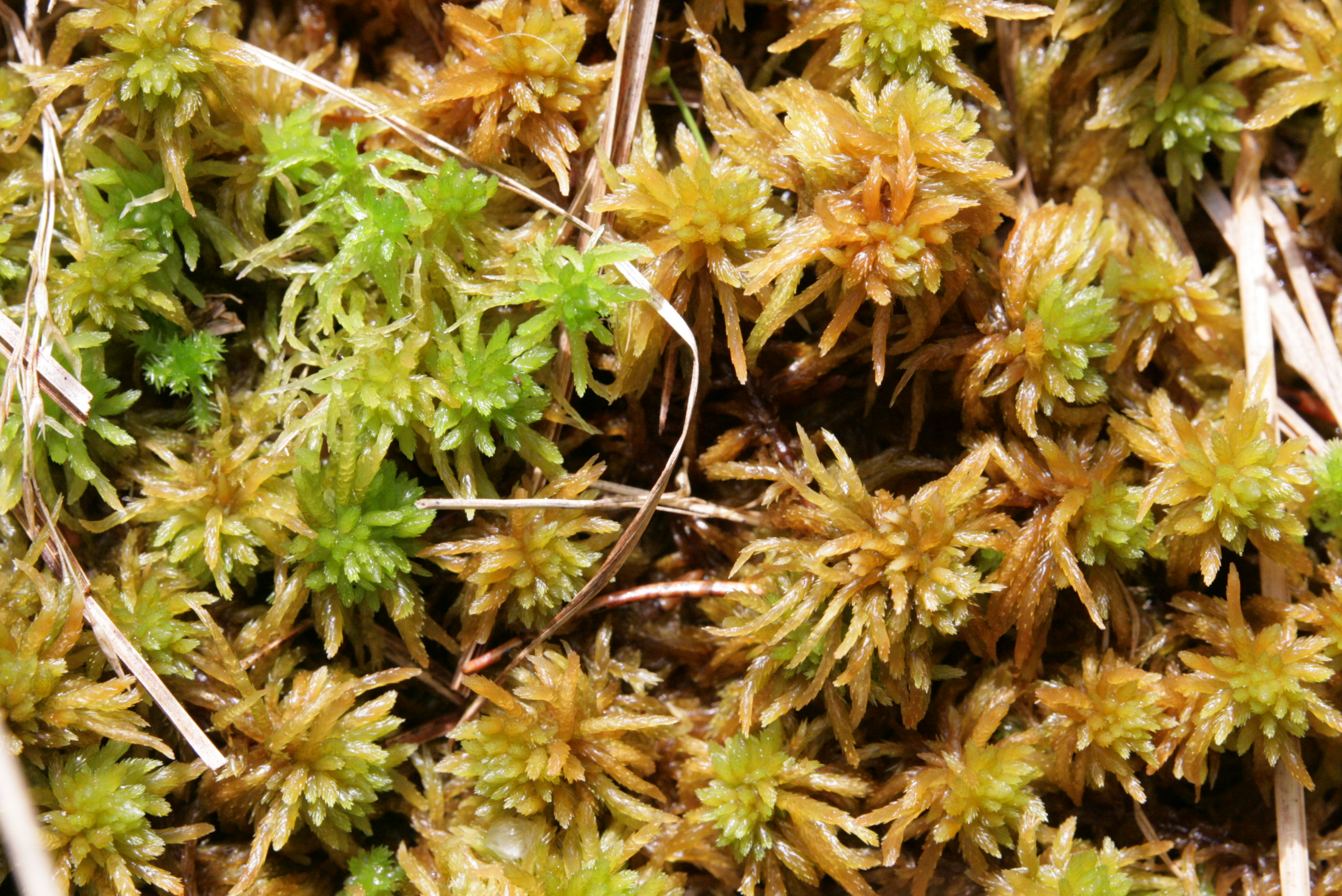

Conservation status
- Least Concern (IUCN 3.1)

- Secure (NatureServe)

Scientific classification
- Kingdom: Plantae
- Division: Bryophyta
- Class: Sphagnopsida
- Order: Sphagnales
- Family: Sphagnaceae
- Genus: Sphagnum
- Species: S. teres

Binomial name
- Sphagnum teres (Schimp.) Ångstr.

Synonyms
- Sphagnum squarrosum ssp. teres (Schimp.) Ångstr.; Sphagnum squarrosum var. teres Schimp.

= Sphagnum teres =

Species of moss

Sphagnum teres, or rigid bogmoss, is a species of moss from the Sphagnaceae family. Widely distributed in the Northern Hemisphere, it grows in mountainous areas in the southern part of its range. It thrives in fertile, minerotrophic peatlands. It is characterized by a clearly visible terminal bud in the middle part of the head and usually a dark brown stem.

== Geographical distribution ==
It is widespread in the Northern Hemisphere in the polar and temperate zones. In Europe, it grows commonly in the north (Scandinavian Peninsula) and the east (up to the Ural Mountains). Its compact distribution in Europe includes areas to the east and north of eastern France, northern Italy, Austria, Slovakia, and northern Ukraine. In southern Europe, its occurrence is limited to mountainous areas (the Pyrenees, Alps, the mountains of the Balkan Peninsula, and the Caucasus). In Asia, it grows in the north (Siberia to Kamchatka Peninsula and Japan) and further south in mountainous regions (Altai Mountains, Himalayas). It is also distributed in North America, extending south into mountainous areas in Colorado and California.

== Morphology ==
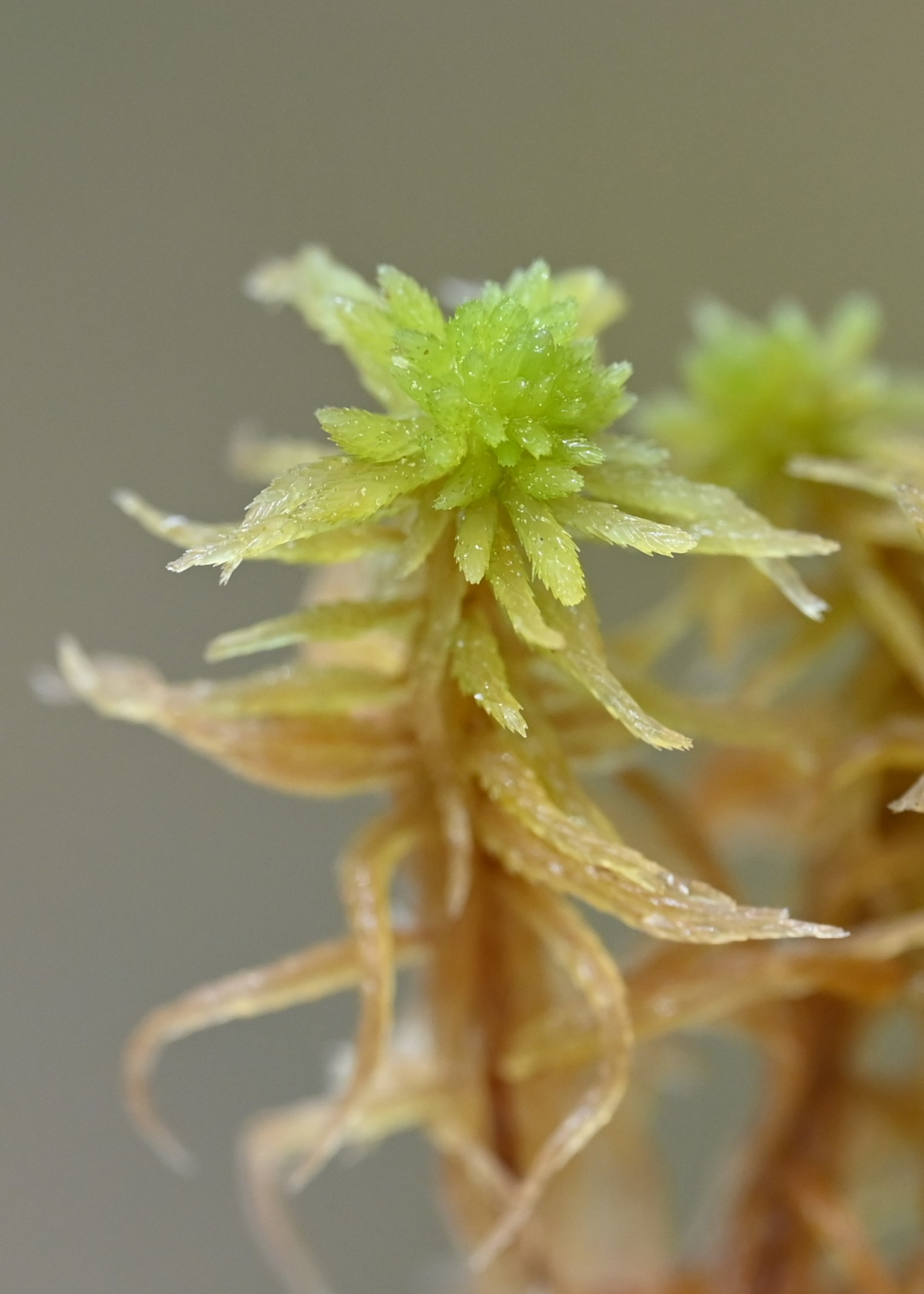
Sphagnum with a straw-yellow color, featuring a conical head topped with a bud and a brownish stem

=== Characteristics ===
The moss is of medium size, forming tufts that can range from rather loose to dense, with colors ranging from light green to yellow to reddish-brown, most commonly appearing yellowish-green. In sunny locations, it tends to be darker (brown).

=== Heads ===
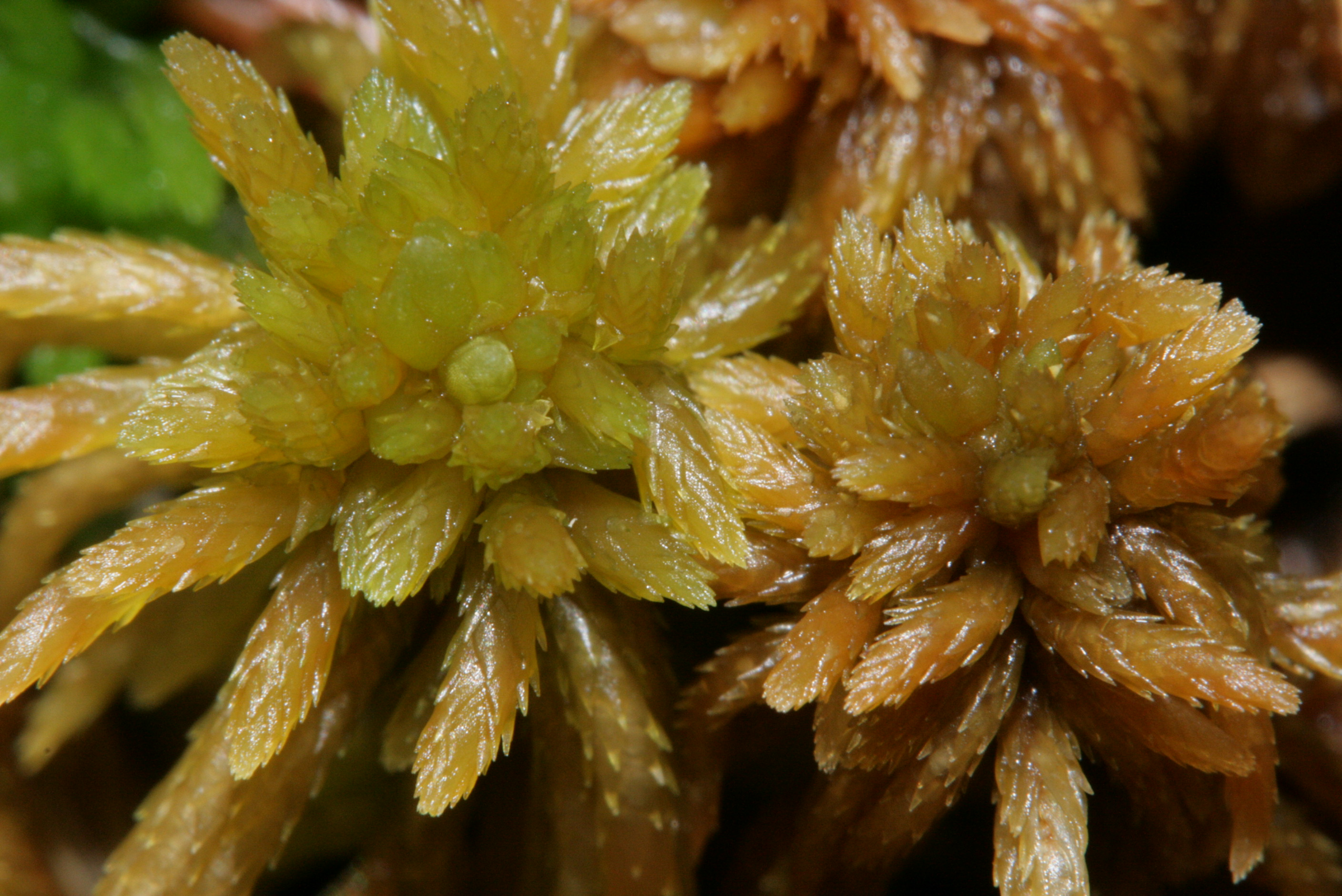
Heads of Sphagnum teres, with the one on the left showing a distinct apical bud

The heads are small or medium-sized, with a clearly visible conical apex.

=== Stems ===
The stems are dark – usually brownish or blackish-brown – but sometimes bright green, with lighter stems occurring in shaded locations. They can reach lengths of up to 20 cm and are relatively thick, with diameters of up to 1 mm. The outer layer (hyaloderma) consists of from 2 to 3, sometimes 4 layers of cells. The outer cells of the hyaloderma may have a single, round pore. The dark coloration of the stem is due to the inner cylinder, which is distinctly separated from the outer layer.

=== Bundles ===
The moss bundles consist of between 4 and 6 branches. Two to three of these branches are spreading and can reach lengths of up to 2 cm. The other two to three branches are drooping and have highly variable lengths (usually finer, lighter, and slightly longer than the spreading ones). The branches are round in cross-section.

=== Stem leaves ===
On the stem, the leaves are either spreading or erect, never tightly adhering to the stem. They are tongue-shaped or rectangular, reaching lengths of up to 1.5 mm and widths of up to 1 mm, with broadly rounded and more or less frayed tips. The edges of the leaf blades are often bordered to the base. The cells of the leaf blades lack riblets.

=== Branch leaves ===
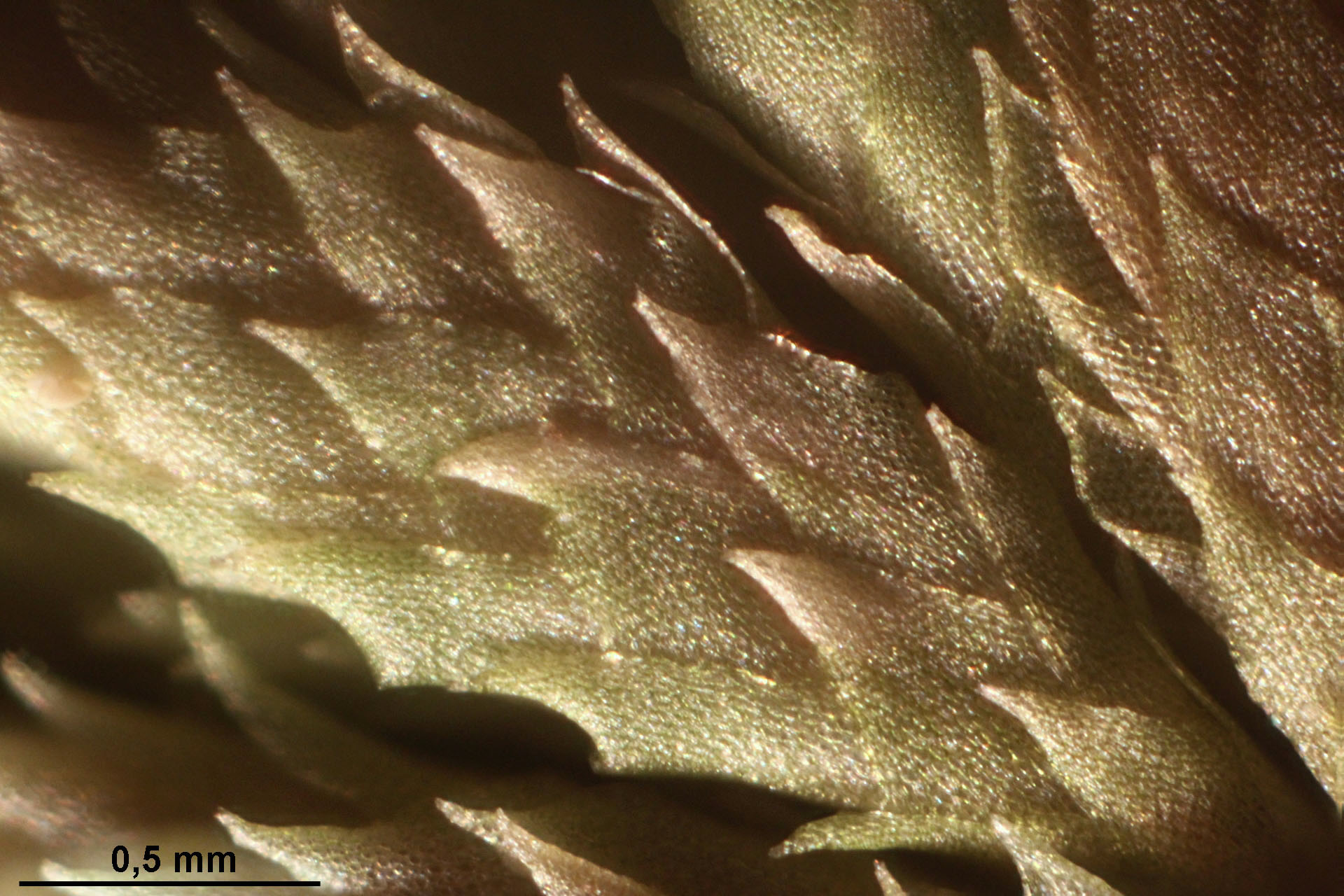
Branch leaves

The leaves overlap in a roof-like manner, but in shaded or drying plants, the tips of the leaves often spread more or less. The leaves are relatively large, reaching up to 2 mm and about 1 mm in width. They have an oval shape, tapering into a long, triangular beak. In cross-section, large water cells are convex on both sides of the leaf, but more so on the ventral side. Both sides are highly porous. The assimilatory cells are triangular, trapezoidal, or oval. They are convex and wider on the dorsal side of the leaves, where their cell walls are more thickened.

=== Gametangia and sporophytes ===
The gametangia are dioecious. Male plants are usually smaller than vegetative ones. The perigonial leaves, supporting the antheridia, do not differ from the vegetative branch leaves. However, the branches with antheridia are shorter, browner, and more densely covered with leaves than vegetative ones. The perichaetial leaves, supporting the archegonia and later the sporophyte, are elongated and tongue-shaped, reaching lengths of between 4 and 5 mm and widths of 2 mm. Sporangia are formed infrequently. The spores are gray-brown and reach about 25 μm in diameter.

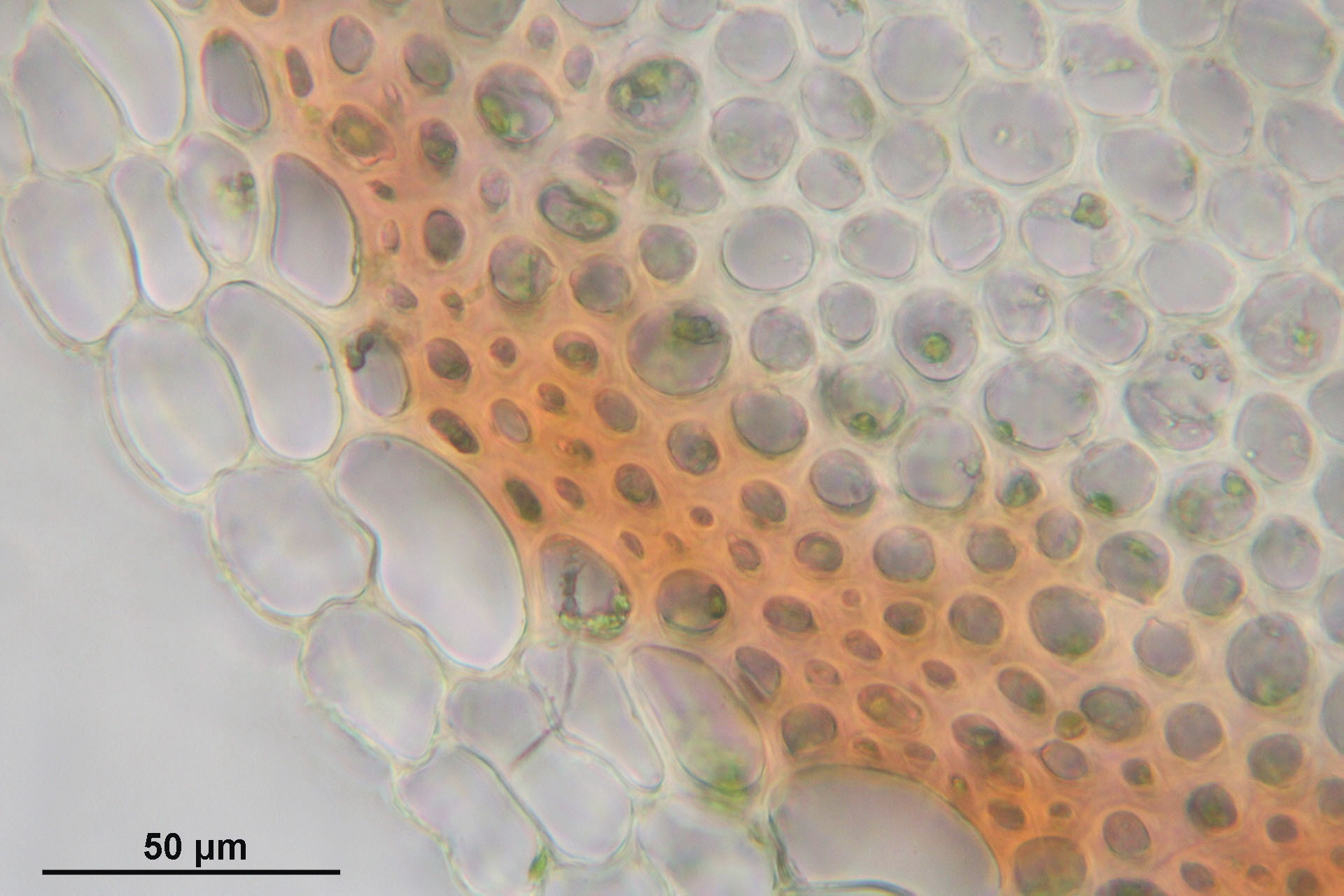
Cross-section of the stem

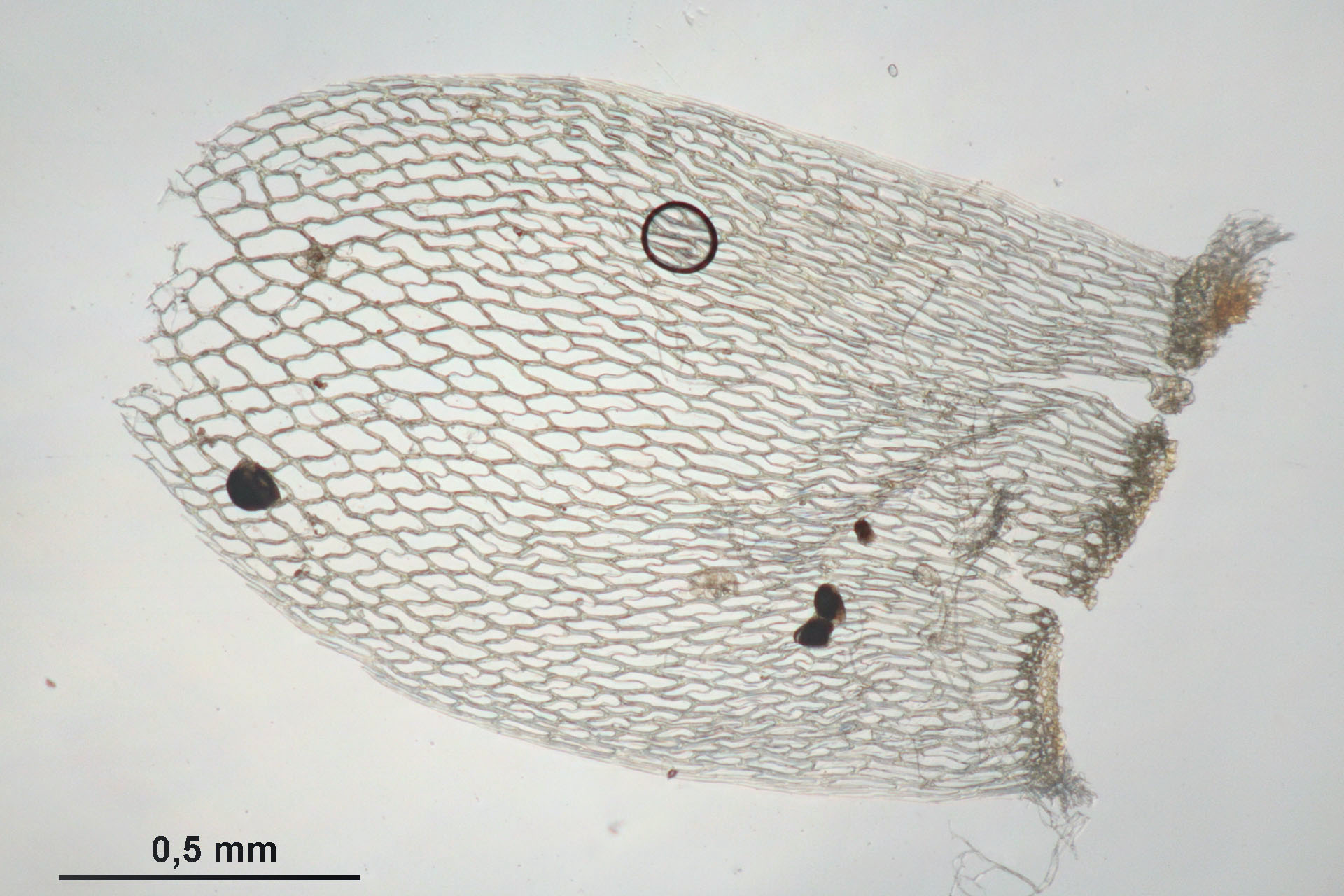
Stem leaf

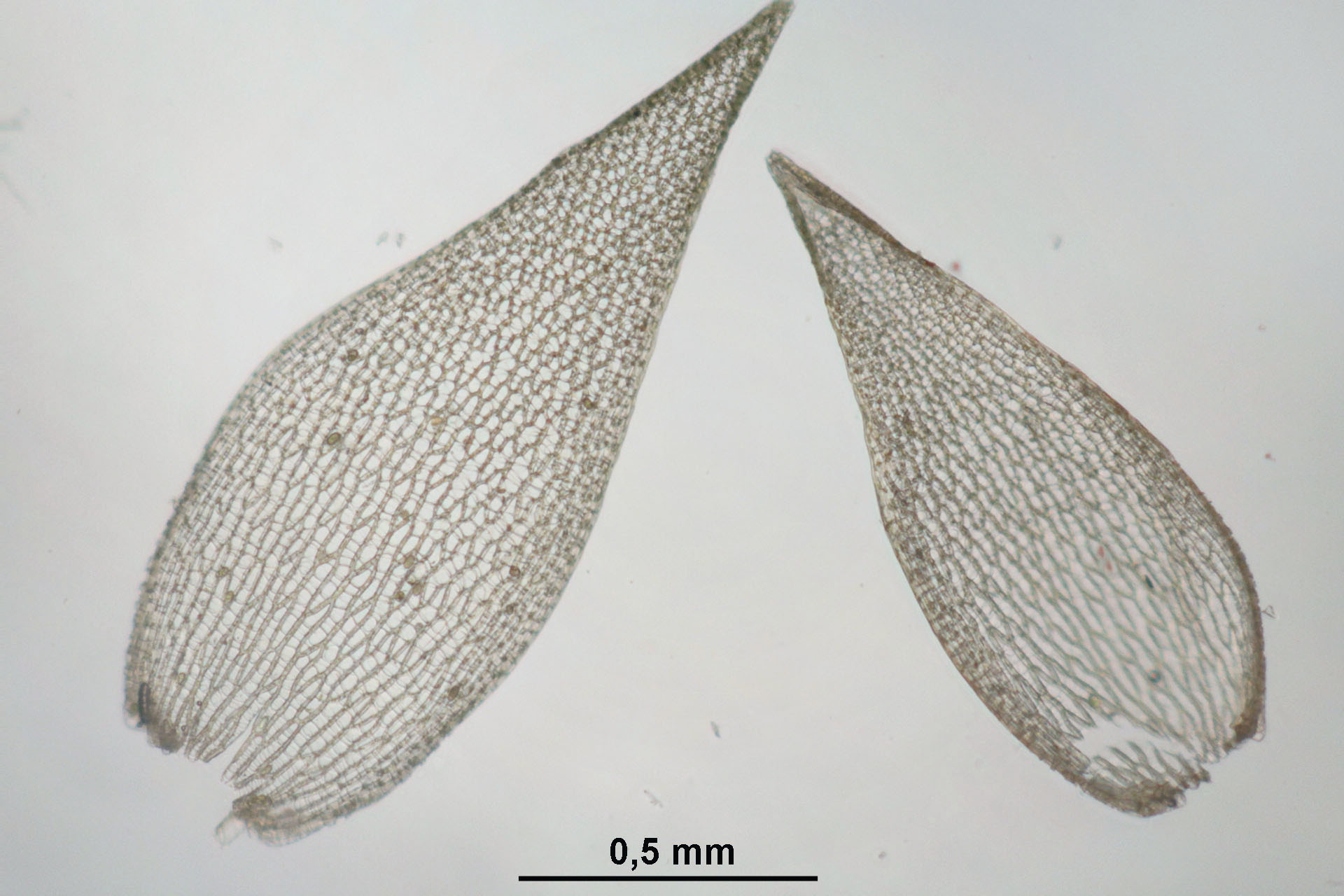
Branch leaves

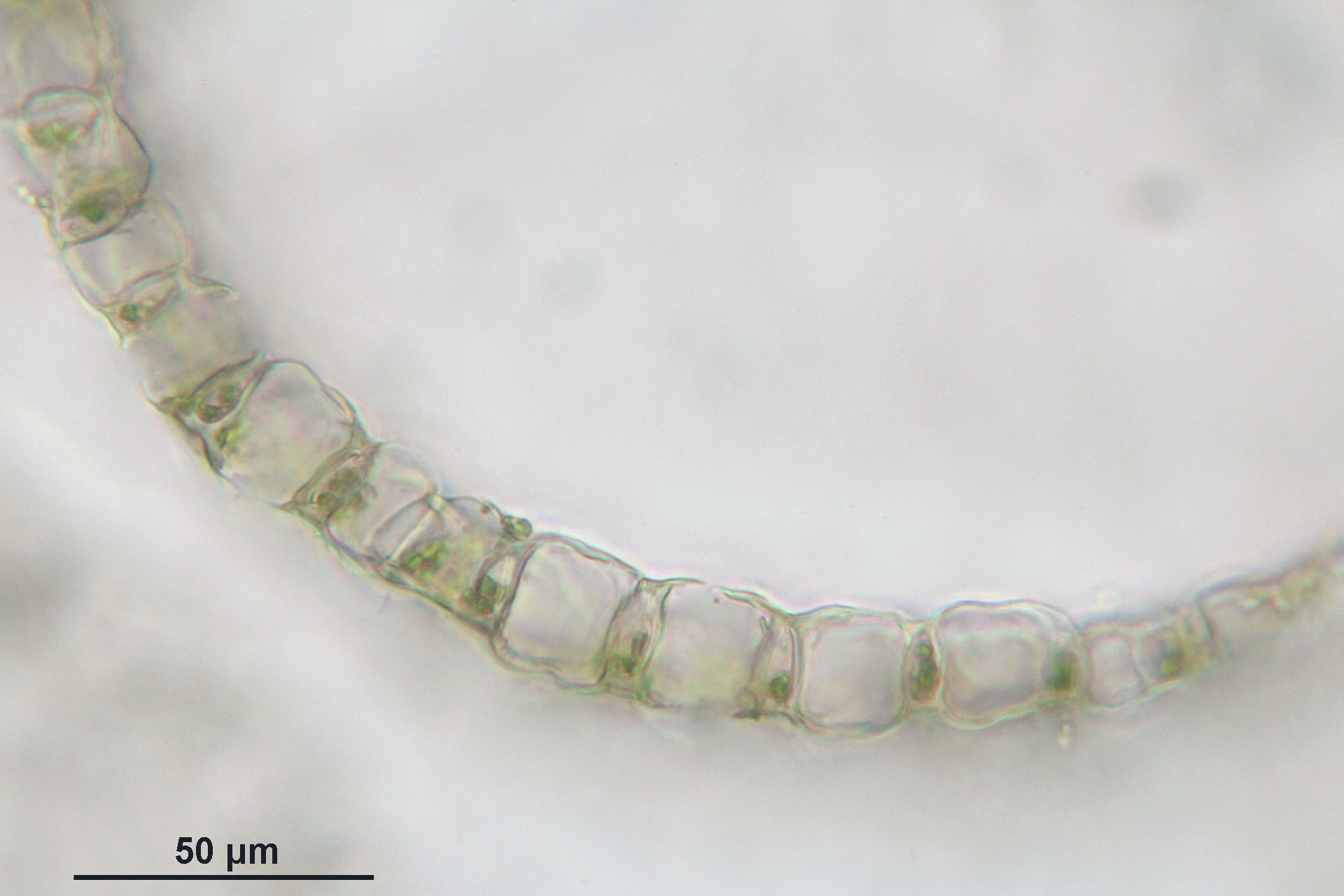
Cross-section of the branch leaf

Similar Species

Macroscopically, Sphagnum girgensohnii, or Girgensohn's bogmoss, is especially similar but has lighter stems (ranging from light green to at most light brown). Sphagnum angustifolium, or fine bogmoss, is also similar, but its apex bud is always hidden by the branches.

== Ecology and biology ==
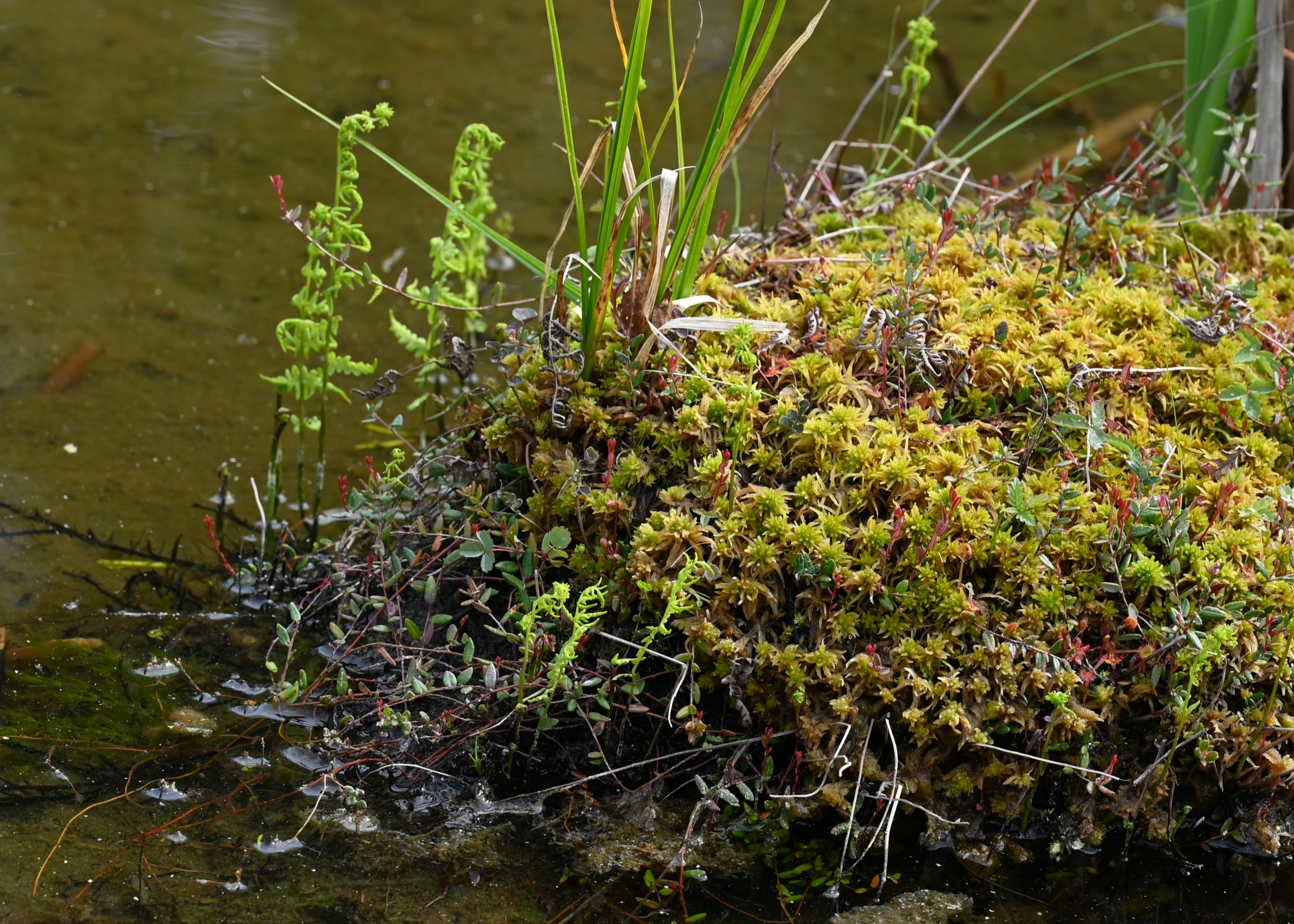
Patch of Sphagnum teres at the edge of a transitional peatland and a bulrush swamp with lesser pond-sedge and marsh fern

Sphagnum teres has a broad trophic spectrum; it occurs in eutrophic and mesotrophic peatlands, as well as fens. However, these habitats are always minerotrophically fed, meaning they are nourished by waters that have previously flowed through mineral substrates. The species is tolerant of varying moisture levels and shade but prefers open areas, rarely growing in thickets or sparse forests, always in locations that are at least damp or wet. It is frequently found in basophilic soligenous peatlands and moss-rich communities within the tundra. It is usually accompanied by other Sphagnum that prefer habitats with higher trophic status, such as Sphagnum warnstorfii, S. subnitens, S. centrale, S. squarrosum, and S. girgensohnii. Common vascular plant companions include common reed, sedges, and rushes.

In the mountains, it can be found at elevations up to 2,400 meters.

In the classification of plant communities in Central Europe, Sphagnum teres is characteristic of Caricion lasiocarpae. In 21st-century syntaxonomic classifications, priority is given to the name Stygio-Caricion limosae Nordhagen 1943, and some communities from Caricion lasiocarpae are included in the group Sphagno-Caricion canescentis Passarge (1964) 1978 and Caricion davallianae Klika 1934. Sphagnum teres lent its name to Sphagnion teretis Succow 1974, which is currently divided into Sphagno warnstorfii-Tomentypnion nitentis Dahl 1957 and Caricion fuscae Koch 1926.

Sporophytes form infrequently, usually maturing in late spring and early summer.

== Systematics and variation ==
Sphagnum teres is classified under the subgenus Isocladus (Lindb.) Braithw. and the section Squarrosa (Russow) Schimp.. This section includes medium to large-sized Sphagnum characterized by a head with a prominent terminal bud, with stem leaves that are either spreading or partially drooping, large, tongue-shaped (± rectangular), and somewhat serrated at the tip. In Europe, the only other species belonging to this section, alongside S. teres, is S. squarrosum; two additional species, S. mirum and S. tundrae, are included outside of Europe.

The presence of plants exhibiting intermediate characteristics between Sphagnum teres and S. squarrosum, as well as their close genetic relationship, suggests the possibility of hybridization between these species.

Historically, a range of forms was attributed to variations arising from habitat conditions. Plants with branch leaves arranged in an overlapping (closely adhering to the branches) pattern were designated as f. imbricatum Warnst. (also f. leioclada), while those with outward-spreading leaf tips were categorized as f. squarrosulum Warnst. (also f. echinoclada).

== Threats and protection ==
The species is widely distributed and common in many areas. On a continental scale in Europe, its resources are considered substantial (especially in Scandinavia and the Baltic countries), and it holds the status of Least-concern (LC) on the IUCN Red List. Despite the decline of the species in southeastern and central Europe, its overall resources are assessed as generally stable.
