= Gustav Karl Girgensohn =

Estonian botanist (1786-1872)

Gustav Karl Girgensohn (1786-1872) was an Estonian botanist (bryologist); court counselor in Tartu. He edited the exsiccata Musci frondosi et Hepaticae exsiccatae. Laub- und Lebermoose der russischen Ostsee-Provinzen in getrockneten Exemplaren (1849-1856).

Plant genus Girgensohnia is named after him.
