= Sphagnum subfulvum =

Scientific classification
- Kingdom: Plantae
- Division: Bryophyta
- Class: Sphagnopsida
- Order: Sphagnales
- Family: Sphagnaceae
- Genus: Sphagnum
- Species: S. subfulvum

Binomial name
- Sphagnum subfulvum Sjörs, 1944

Species of moss

Sphagnum subfulvum is a species of moss belonging to the family Sphagnaceae.

It is native to Northern Hemisphere.
