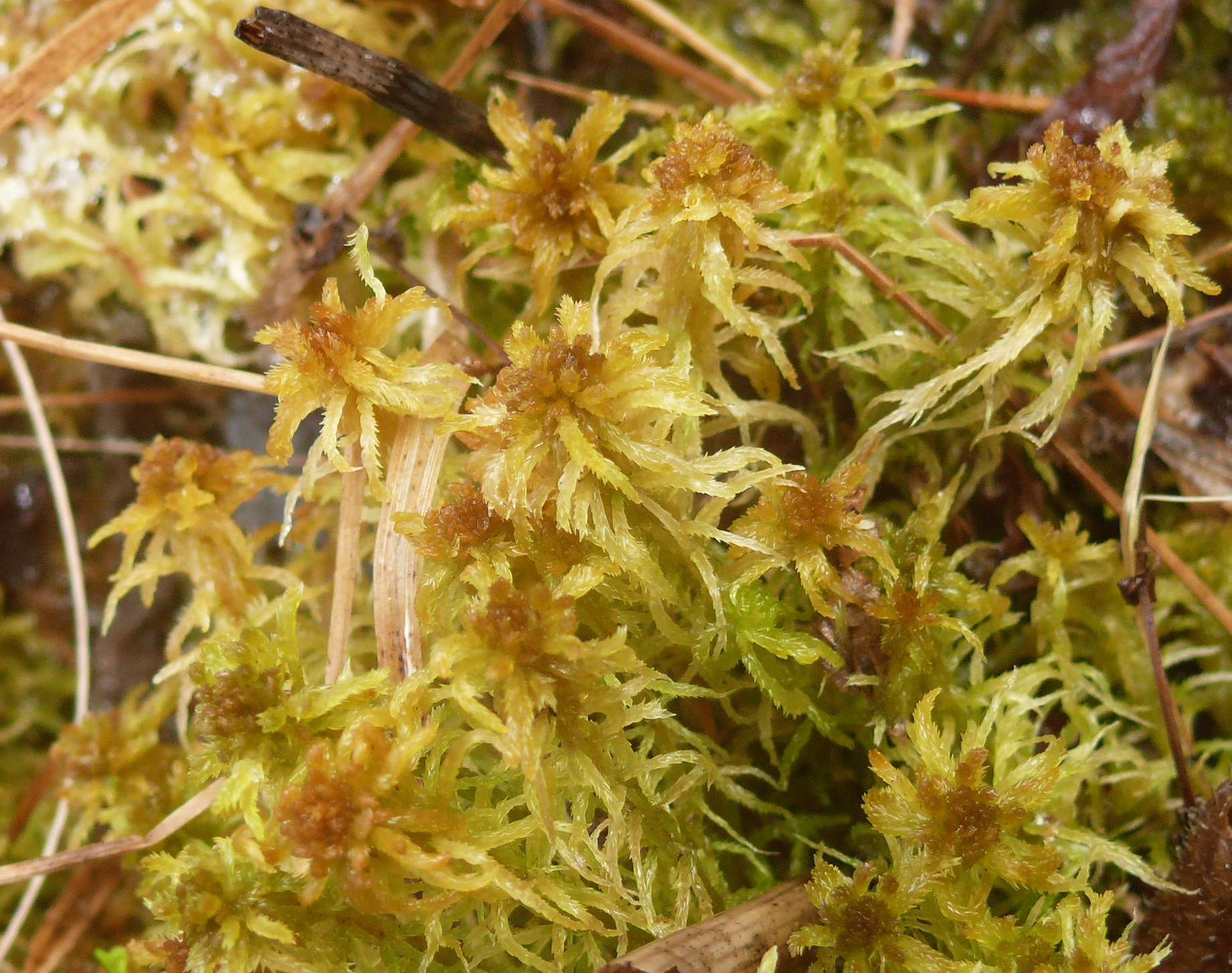

Scientific classification
- Kingdom: Plantae
- Division: Bryophyta
- Class: Sphagnopsida
- Order: Sphagnales
- Family: Sphagnaceae
- Genus: Sphagnum
- Species: S. contortum

Binomial name
- Sphagnum contortum Schultz, 1819

= Sphagnum contortum =

Species of moss

Sphagnum contortum is a species of moss reported in North America and Europe. NatureServe marked its global conservation status as Secure.

== Common names ==
In English, it goes by the common names contorted sphagnum, twisted sphagnum moss, and twisted bog-moss.

== Description ==
The species is dioicious and sporophyte is rare in this species. S. contortum also has capsules but it is unknown if S. contortum in Great Britain or Ireland have this.

== Distribution and habitat ==
It occurs in minerotrophic habitats, riparian areas, peatlands, and rarely in open wet woodlands. It also occurs at moderate to low elevations and is not shade tolerant.

=== Distribution ===
Sphagnum contortum is frequent in northern and western parts of the British Isles but rare in southern and eastern parts.

It also occurs in various parts of the United States. Like in California, it occurs in the north-western parts of the state even in the Klamath Mountains. NatureServe lists it as critically imperiled in States like Washington, New Jersey, Pennsylvania, Virginia, North Carolina, and Montana (it only occurs in Flathead County).

In Canada, S. contortum is widely spread out through the province of Quebec where it is listed as apparently secure by NatureServe. But it is listed as vulnerable in other provinces like Alberta, British Columbia, and Ontario.

It also occurs in other countries like Bulgaria or Turkey, and the Czech Republic.

== Response to herbicide exposure ==
In a study of the effect of the herbicide Asulam on moss growth, Sphagnum contortum was shown to be the second most sensitive to the herbicide out of the 18 species tested. The study concluded that it was sensitive to Asulam exposure.
