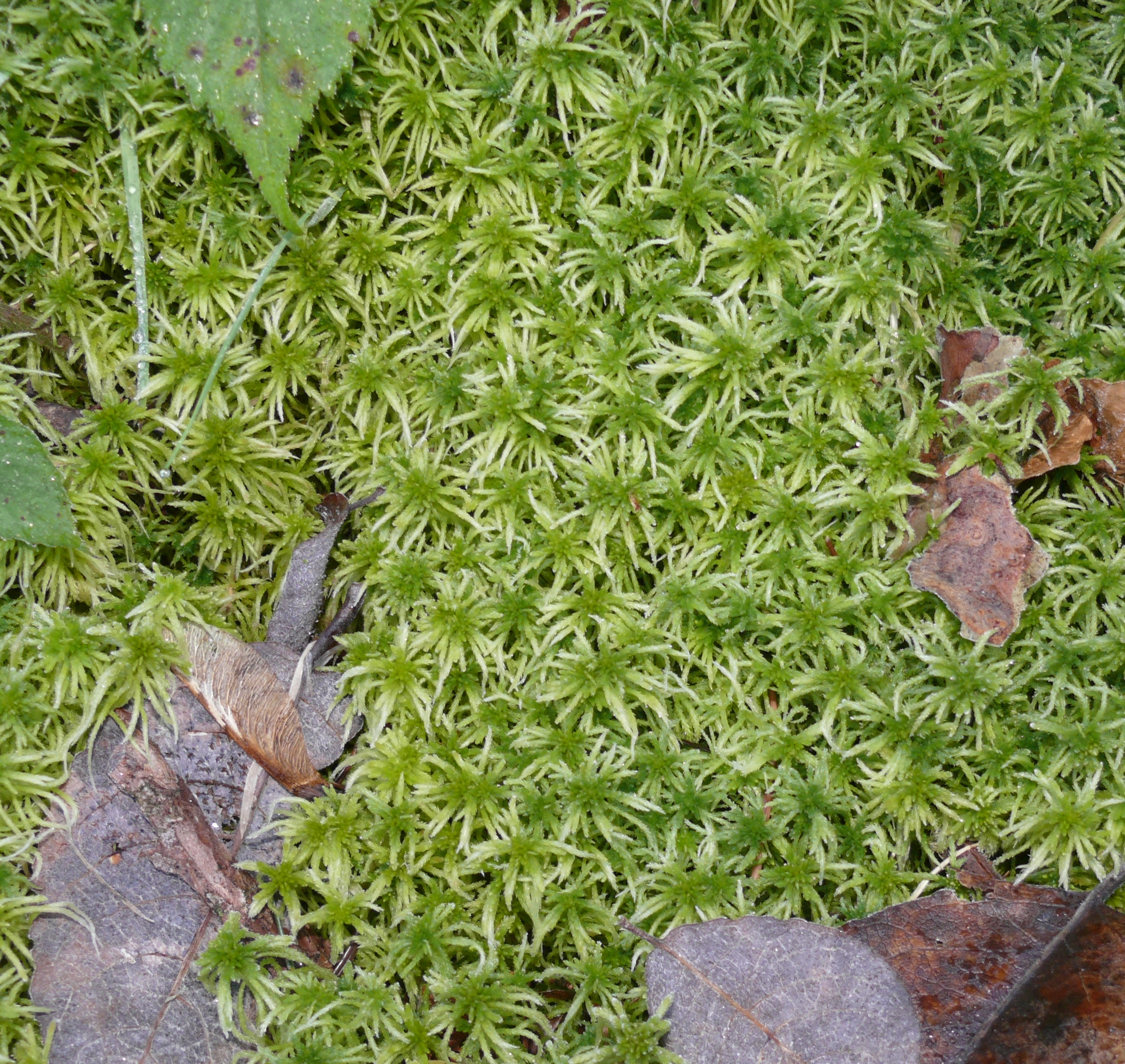

Conservation status
- Least Concern (IUCN 3.1) (Europe regional assessment)

- Secure (NatureServe)

Scientific classification
- Kingdom: Plantae
- Division: Bryophyta
- Class: Sphagnopsida
- Subclass: Sphagnidae
- Order: Sphagnales
- Family: Sphagnaceae
- Genus: Sphagnum
- Species: S. girgensohnii

Binomial name
- Sphagnum girgensohnii Russow

Synonyms
- List: Sphagnum acutifolium subsp. girgensohnii (Russow) Cardot; Sphagnum acutifolium var. laxifolium (Warnst.) Cardot; Sphagnum girgensohnii var. laxifolium Warnst.; Sphagnum girgensohnii var. squarrosulum Russow; Sphagnum girgensohnii var. subfibrosum (Röll) Cardot; Sphagnum godmanii Warnst.; Sphagnum hookeri Müll.Hal.; Sphagnum mehneri Warnst.; Sphagnum nemoreum subsp. girgensohnii (Russow) Bott.; Sphagnum veresczagini Semenov; Sphagnum warnstorfii var. subfibrosum Röll; Sphagnum strictum Lindb.; Sphagnum girgensohnii var. albescens Röll; Sphagnum girgensohnii var. brachycladum Bott.; Sphagnum girgensohnii f. capitatum Röll; Sphagnum girgensohnii var. commune Russow; Sphagnum girgensohnii var. compactum Röll; Sphagnum girgensohnii var. cristatum Russow; Sphagnum girgensohnii var. deflexum Schlieph.; Sphagnum girgensohnii var. densum Grav. ex Warnst.; Sphagnum girgensohnii var. dimorphum Röll; Sphagnum girgensohnii var. flagellare Schlieph. ex Bott.; Sphagnum girgensohnii var. flavolimbatum G.Roth; Sphagnum girgensohnii var. fragile Röll; Sphagnum girgensohnii var. gracilescens Grav. ex Warnst.; Sphagnum girgensohnii var. hydrophyllum Russow; Sphagnum girgensohnii var. hygrophilum Russow; Sphagnum girgensohnii var. immersum Warnst.; Sphagnum girgensohnii var. intricatum Röll; Sphagnum girgensohnii f. koryphaeum (Russow) Warnst.; Sphagnum girgensohnii var. laxum Röll; Sphagnum girgensohnii var. leptostachys Russow; Sphagnum girgensohnii var. microcephalum Warnst.; Sphagnum girgensohnii var. molle Grav. ex Warnst.; Sphagnum girgensohnii var. patulum Schlieph.; Sphagnum girgensohnii var. prageri Warnst.; Sphagnum girgensohnii var. pulchrum Grav. ex Warnst.; Sphagnum girgensohnii f. pumilum (Ångstr. ex Warnst.) Warnst.; Sphagnum girgensohnii f. speciosum (Limpr.) Warnst.; Sphagnum girgensohnii var. spectabile Russow; Sphagnum girgensohnii f. sphaerocephalum (Warnst.) Warnst.; Sphagnum girgensohnii var. stachyodes Russow; Sphagnum girgensohnii var. strictiforme Röll; Sphagnum girgensohnii var. strictum Russow; Sphagnum girgensohnii var. subglaucum Péterfi; Sphagnum girgensohnii var. tenellum Röll; Sphagnum girgensohnii var. tenue Röll; Sphagnum girgensohnii f. teretiusculum (Warnst.) Warnst.; Sphagnum girgensohnii var. xerophilum Russow ex C.E.O.Jensen; Sphagnum strictum var. majus Lesq. & James; Sphagnum strictum var. squarrosulum (Russow) Braithw.; Sphagnum veresczaginii var. squarrosum Semenov; Sphagnum warnstorfii var. pseudopallens Röll; Sphagnum warnstorfii var. pulchrum Röll; Sphagnum acutifolium var. deflexum (Schlieph.) Cardot; Sphagnum acutifolium var. densum (Grav. ex Warnst.) Cardot; Sphagnum acutifolium var. gracilescens (Grav. ex Warnst.) Cardot; Sphagnum acutifolium var. speciosum (Limpr.) Hérib.; Sphagnum acutifolium var. squarrosulum (Russow) Cardot; Sphagnum acutifolium var. strictum (Russow) Cardot; Sphagnum girgensohnii var. capitatum (Röll) Röll; Sphagnum girgensohnii var. koryphaeum Russow; Sphagnum girgensohnii f. laxifolium (Warnst.) Warnst.; Sphagnum girgensohnii var. molle Russow ex Warnst.; Sphagnum girgensohnii var. pumilum Ångstr. ex Warnst.; Sphagnum girgensohnii var. speciosum Limpr.; Sphagnum girgensohnii var. sphaerocephalum Warnst.; Sphagnum girgensohnii var. teretiusculum Warnst.; Sphagnum molle f. squarrosulum Warnst.

= Sphagnum girgensohnii =

Species of moss

Sphagnum girgensohnii, commonly known as Girgensohn's bogmoss, Girgensohn's sphagnum or common green peat moss, is a species of peat moss with a Holarctic and Indo-Malesian distribution. First described by Edmund Russow in 1865, it is a relatively robust moss species characterised by its green to straw-coloured appearance and distinctive branching pattern. The species typically grows in shaded, damp woodlands and on the edges of mires, forming loose mats particularly under birch and willow trees, and can be found from sea level to elevations of 2,200 m (7,200 ft). While it shows a mainly northern distribution pattern and is especially abundant in subarctic regions, it occurs throughout Europe from Portugal to Russia, being more common in upland areas. Despite facing threats from habitat degradation and land-use changes, S. girgensohnii is assessed by the IUCN as Least Concern due to its extensive range and stable populations, though it receives legal protection under various national and international frameworks, including the EU Habitats Directive.

== Taxonomy ==
Sphagnum girgensohnii was first described by the German botanist Edmund Russow in 1865, with the original description appearing on page 46 of his publication, accompanied by illustrations in table II. Many taxonomic synonyms have been recorded for this species, including:

- Sphagnum girgensohnii var. strictum Russow (1865)
- Sphagnum strictum S.O.Lindberg (1872), nom. illeg. (not S. strictum Sull. 1845)

== Description ==
Sphagnum girgensohnii is a relatively robust species of peat moss. The plant typically appears in shades of green to straw-coloured, with stems ranging from pale green to light brown. Unlike some related species, it never develops red colouration. At the top of each plant is a cluster of branches (known as the capitulum) that often takes on a yellowish-brown hue. The plant's stem is fairly thick, measuring between 0.6 and 1.0 mm in diameter. It is protected by an outer layer (cortex) made up of 2–3 layers of transparent cells, each containing a distinctive large pore that can be observed even under basic magnification.

The branches grow in clusters of three (occasionally four) at intervals along the stem. Each cluster typically contains two spreading branches that can grow exceptionally long—often exceeding 25 mm—and one or two hanging branches that appear pale and cylindrical. Near the plant's top, these spreading branches become shorter and slightly club-shaped.

The leaves found on the stem are upright and pressed close to it, measuring 0.8–1.3 mm in length. They have a distinctive shape that is roughly rectangular or tongue-like, often appearing slightly pinched in the middle (described technically as 'lyrate'). The stem leaves have a wide, torn apex and are bordered by elongated cells that become distinctly broader at the leaf's base.

The branch leaves, which are never arranged in five distinct rows, are fairly large for this type of peat moss (1.4–1.8 mm long). They have a broadly lance-like shape with strongly curved edges, giving them a somewhat pointed appearance. These leaves contain two types of cells: small living cells that contain chlorophyll for photosynthesis, and larger, empty cells (hyaline cells) that help the plant store water. The hyaline cells feature numerous pores, particularly on their outer surface, which are crucial for water absorption and movement within the plant.

Sphagnum girgensohnii is dioecious, meaning male and female reproductive structures occur on separate plants. The male plants tend to be smaller than female ones, with shorter branches and distinctive brown reproductive structures. While the species can produce spore capsules, these are rarely seen. When present, the spores are yellowish-brown, slightly textured, and measure 23–27 micrometres (μm) in diameter.

Morphology
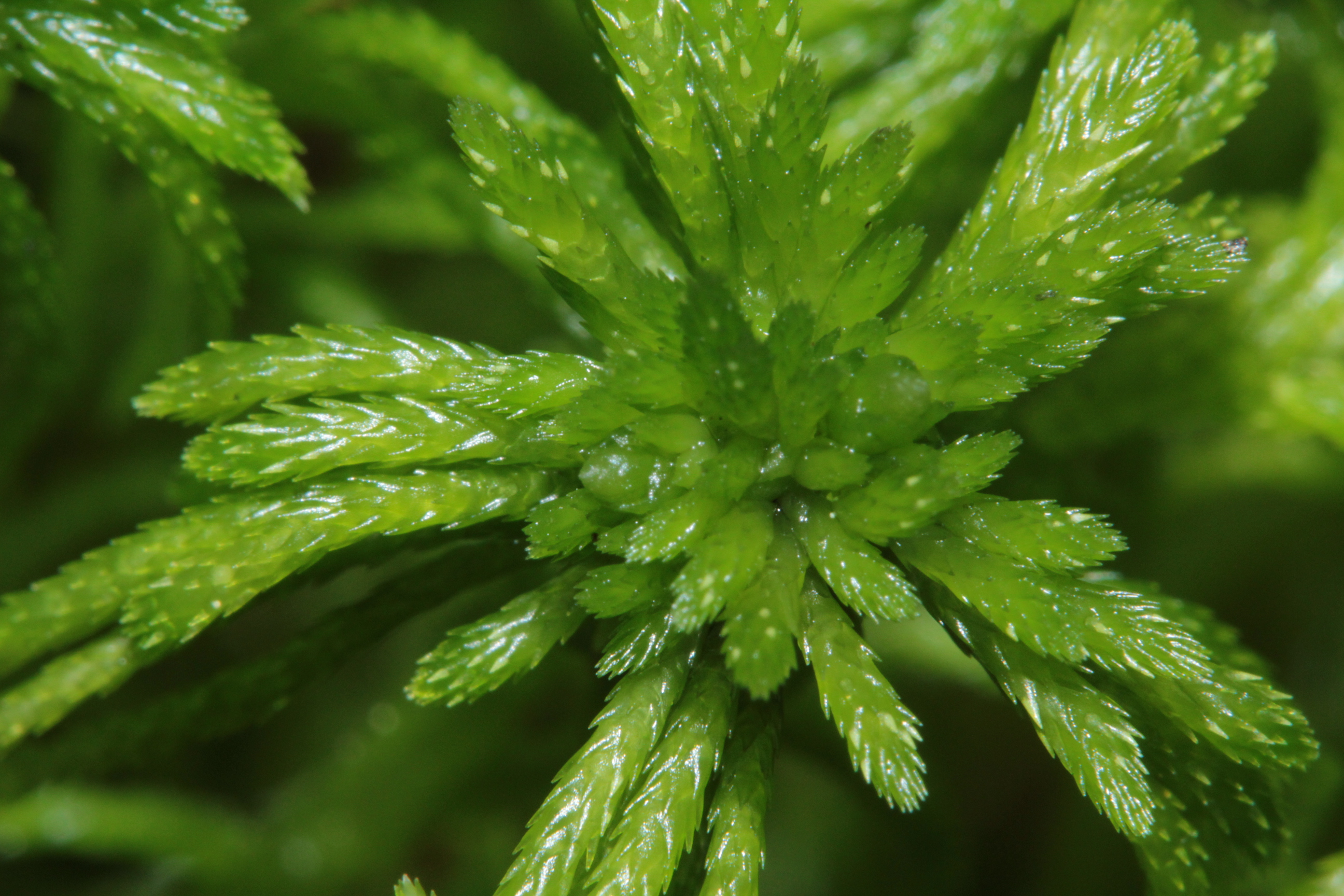
Close-up view of the capitulum (branch cluster) showing its characteristic green colouration and spreading branch arrangement

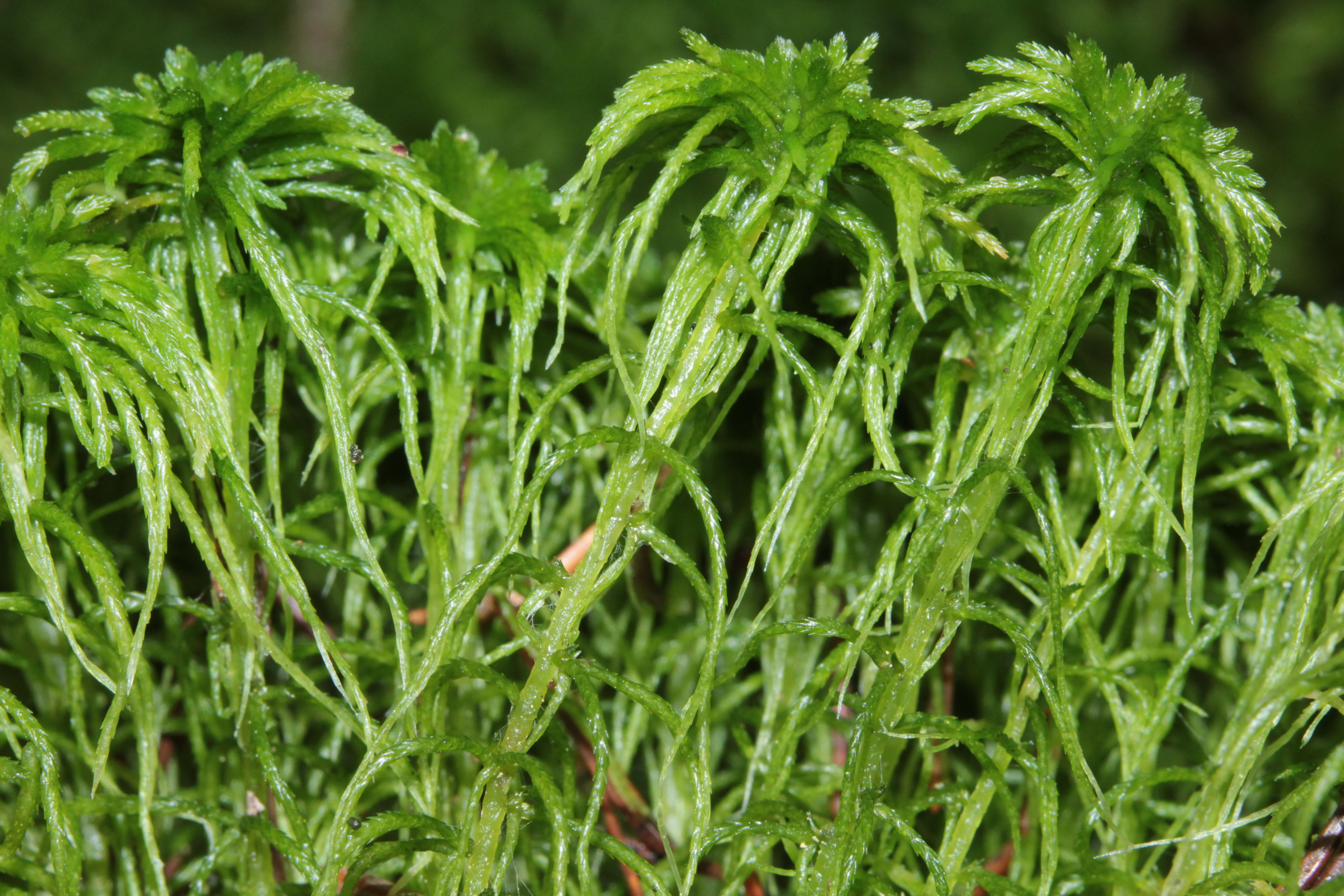
Growth habit, showing multiple stems with characteristic spreading branches

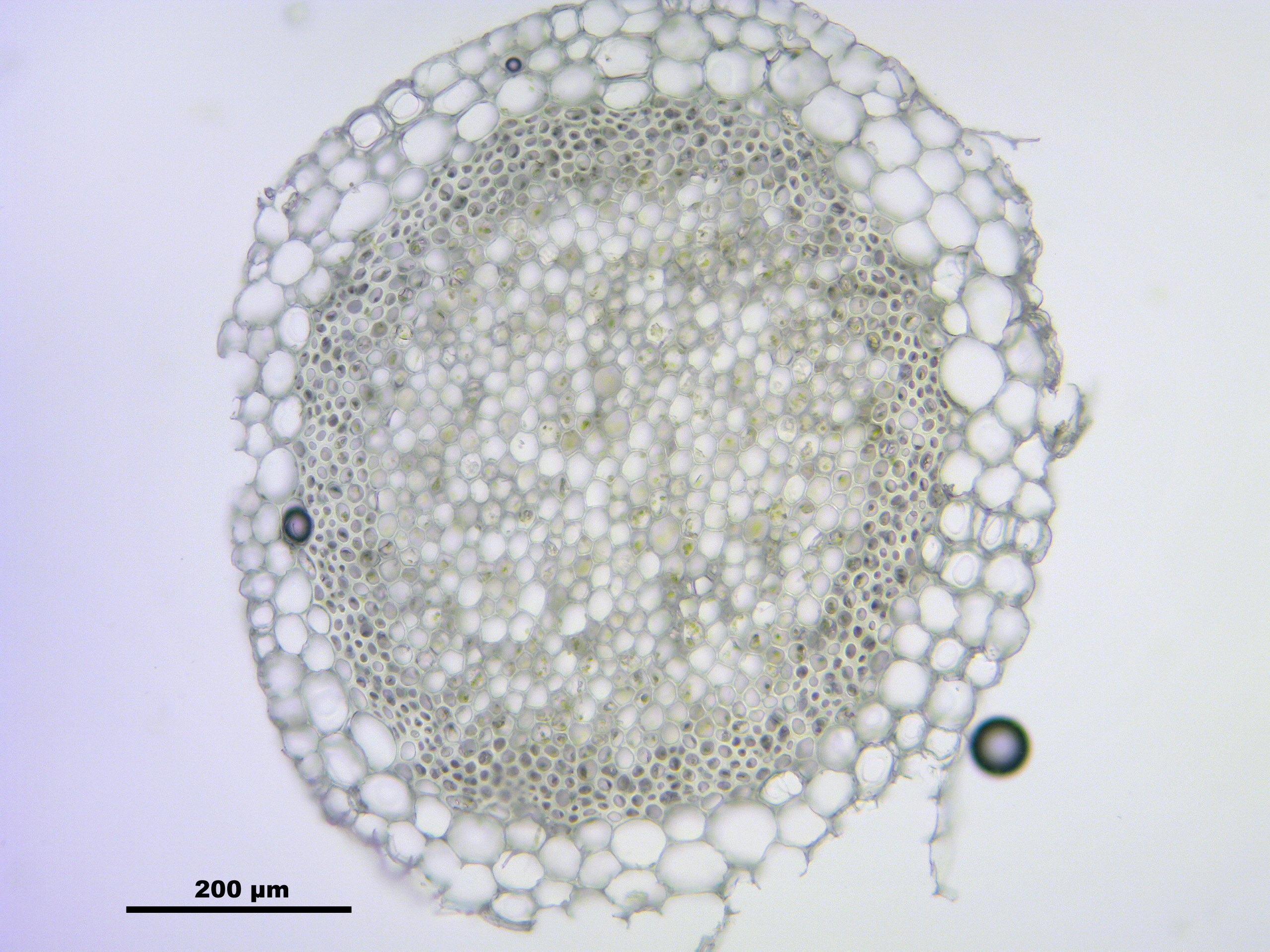
Cross section of stem showing the characteristic anatomy: large hyaline cells of the cortex (outer layers) surrounding the internal cylinder.
Scale bar = 200 μm

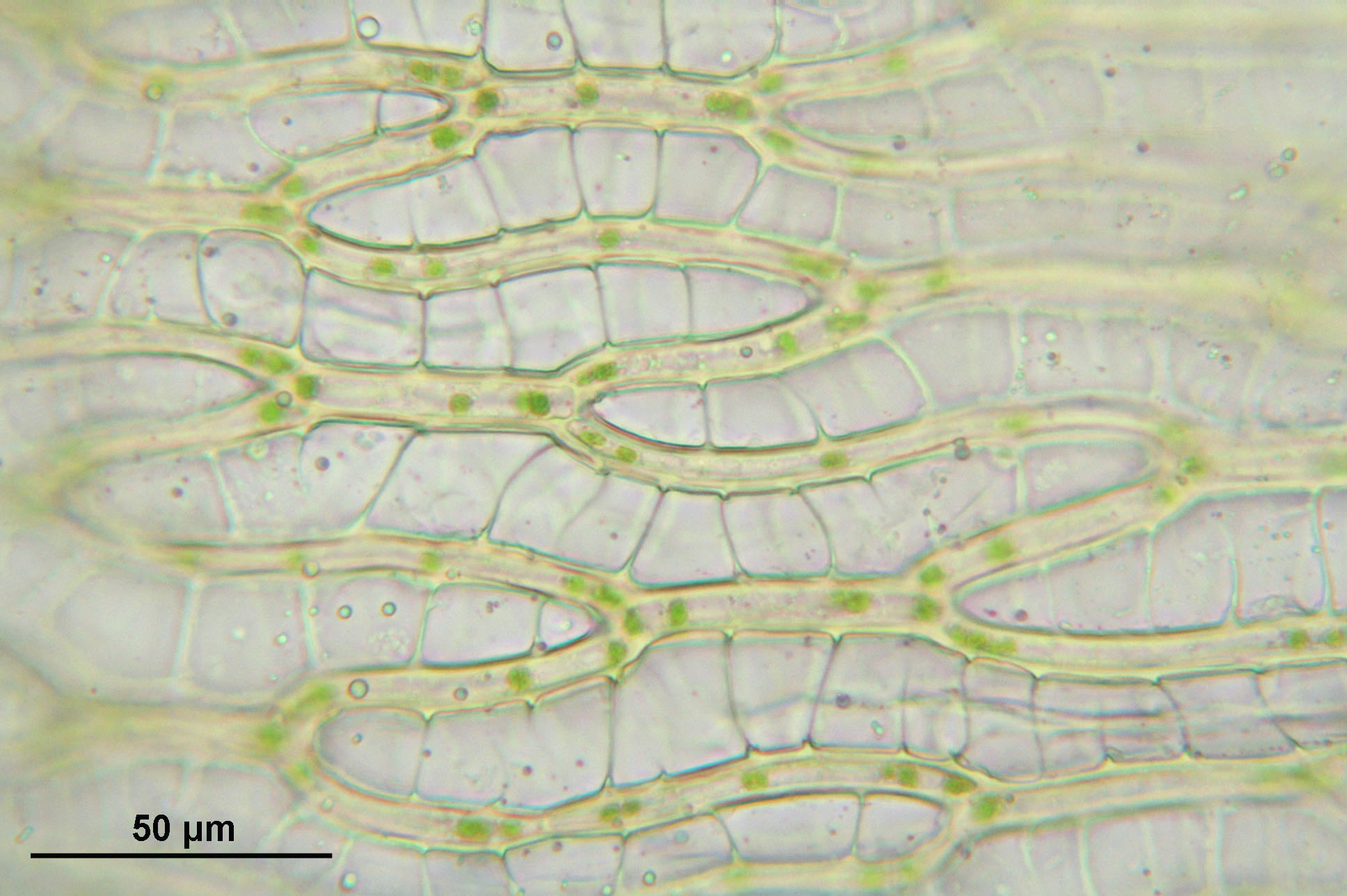
Side view (longitudinal section) leaf cells showing elongated hyaline cells with small chlorophyllose cells between them.
Scale bar = 50 μm

== Distribution and habitat ==
Sphagnum girgensohnii typically inhabits shaded environments where the peat layer is relatively thin and where there is notable influence from mineral-rich water. Rather than occurring in deep peat bogs, it favours damp woodland settings, grassy hillsides, and the edges of ditches. The species is particularly common along the margins of mires, especially in areas where fen woodland has developed. It characteristically grows above the water table, forming loose, scattered clumps or mats, often beneath birch (Betula) or willow (Salix) trees. The species shows considerable habitat flexibility, being found in wet depressions in swamps and dwarf shrub heaths, in addition to its typical woodland habitats.

In its northernmost range, the species shows greater habitat flexibility, extending into more open mire environments. It becomes particularly abundant in subarctic peatlands dominated by cotton grass (Eriophorum), where it frequently grows alongside another peat moss species, Sphagnum russowii. While primarily considered a subalpine species, it can be found from sea level to well above the tree line, reaching elevations of up to 2,200 m (7,200 ft) above sea level.

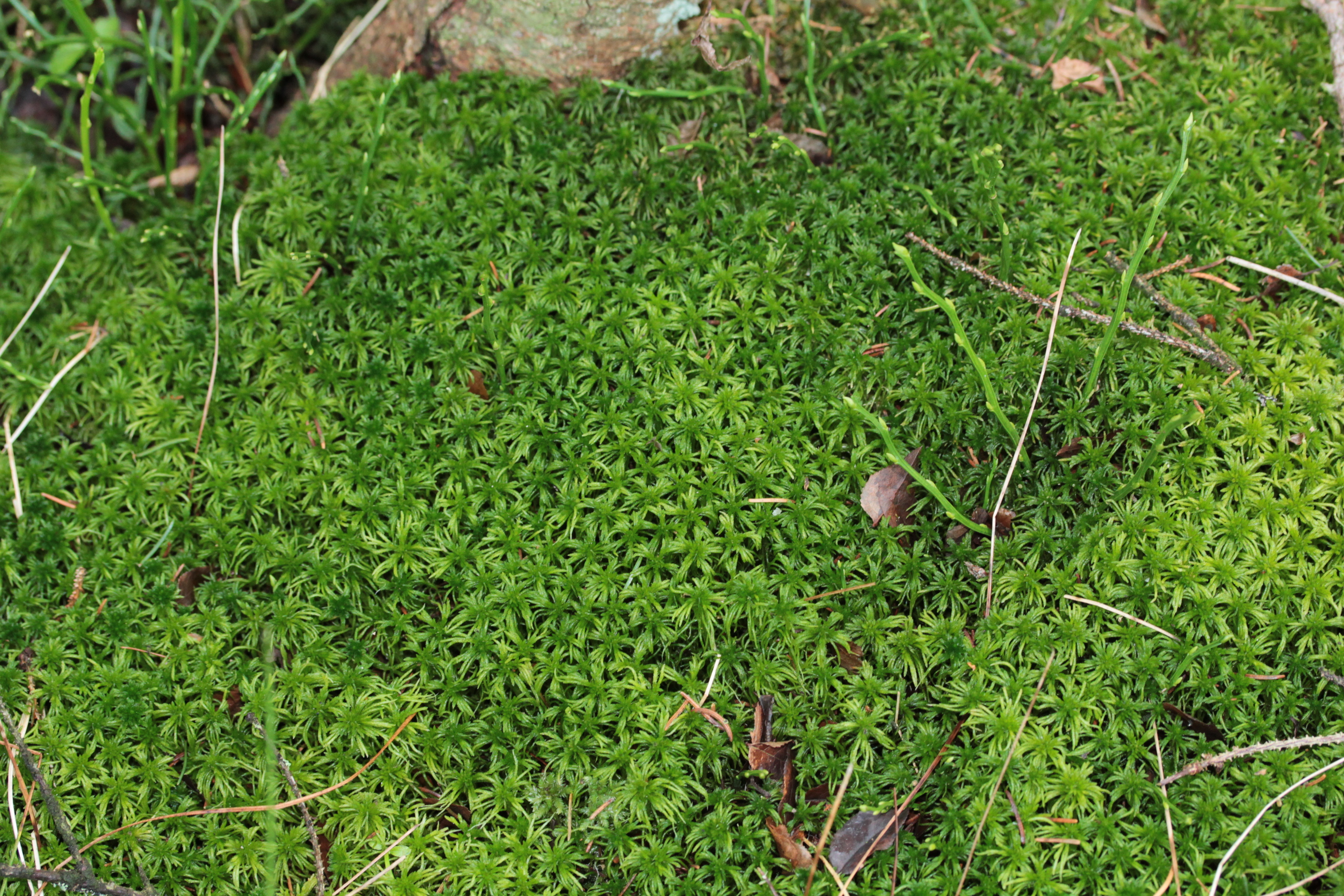
Typical growth habit of Sphagnum girgensohnii forming a dense green mat on woodland floor

The species has a wide distribution across the Northern Hemisphere. In Europe, it occurs from Portugal to Russia, and from Svalbard to Italy and Spain, being absent only from Moldova, Greece, and some smaller Mediterranean countries and territories. While it can be found sporadically throughout lowland regions, it becomes notably more prevalent in upland and subarctic zones. It is particularly abundant in northern Iceland and across northern Scandinavia, where it ranks among the most common Sphagnum species. In the British Isles, there is a clear north-south gradient to its distribution: the species is rare in southern Britain but becomes increasingly common as one moves northward through Wales and northern England, reaching its greatest abundance in Scotland. It is also widely distributed across Ireland, showing a similar preference for northern regions.

== Conservation ==
Sphagnum girgensohnii is assessed as Least Concern (LC) both across Europe as a whole and within the European Union specifically. This classification reflects the species' extensive range and stable population trends throughout most of its distribution area. Despite its favourable conservation status, the species faces several anthropogenic threats. Like many wetland species, it is particularly sensitive to habitat degradation caused by drainage, eutrophication, and pollution. Changes in land use and increasing urbanisation also pose challenges to its survival in some areas.

While generally stable across its range, conservation concern varies regionally. The species appears on several national Red Lists, with varying levels of threat assessment. It is classified as Endangered in Hungary, Vulnerable in Luxembourg and Serbia, and Near Threatened in Ireland. In the Netherlands, it is considered 'highly endangered'. In the majority of countries where it occurs, it is listed as Least Concern.

Legal protection for S. girgensohnii exists at both national and international levels. As with all Sphagnum species, it is included in Annex V of the European Union's Habitats Directive, which regulates the collection of wild specimens. Some countries have implemented additional protective measures; for example, in Switzerland, all Sphagnum species, including S. girgensohnii, are protected under the "Ordinance on the Protection of Nature and Cultural Heritage".

The species is present in numerous protected areas throughout its range, including Portugal's Serra da Estrela Natural Park. While the species itself is not specifically harvested or traded commercially, it may occasionally be collected along with other Sphagnum species for use in horticultural applications or floral arrangements. Given its stable population trends and widespread distribution, conservation efforts focus primarily on habitat protection rather than species-specific interventions. Continued monitoring is important, however, particularly in regions where the species is considered threatened or where habitat degradation is ongoing.

== See also ==
- List of Sphagnum species
