= List of clubmosses and mosses of Montana =

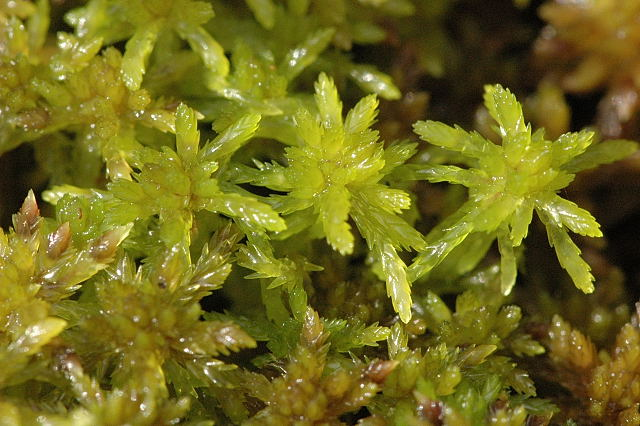
sphagnum moss (Sphagnum flexuosum)

There are at least 23 species of clubmosses and 153 species of mosses found in the state of Montana in the United States. The Montana Natural Heritage Program has identified a number of clubmoss and moss species as species of concern.

== Clubmosses ==
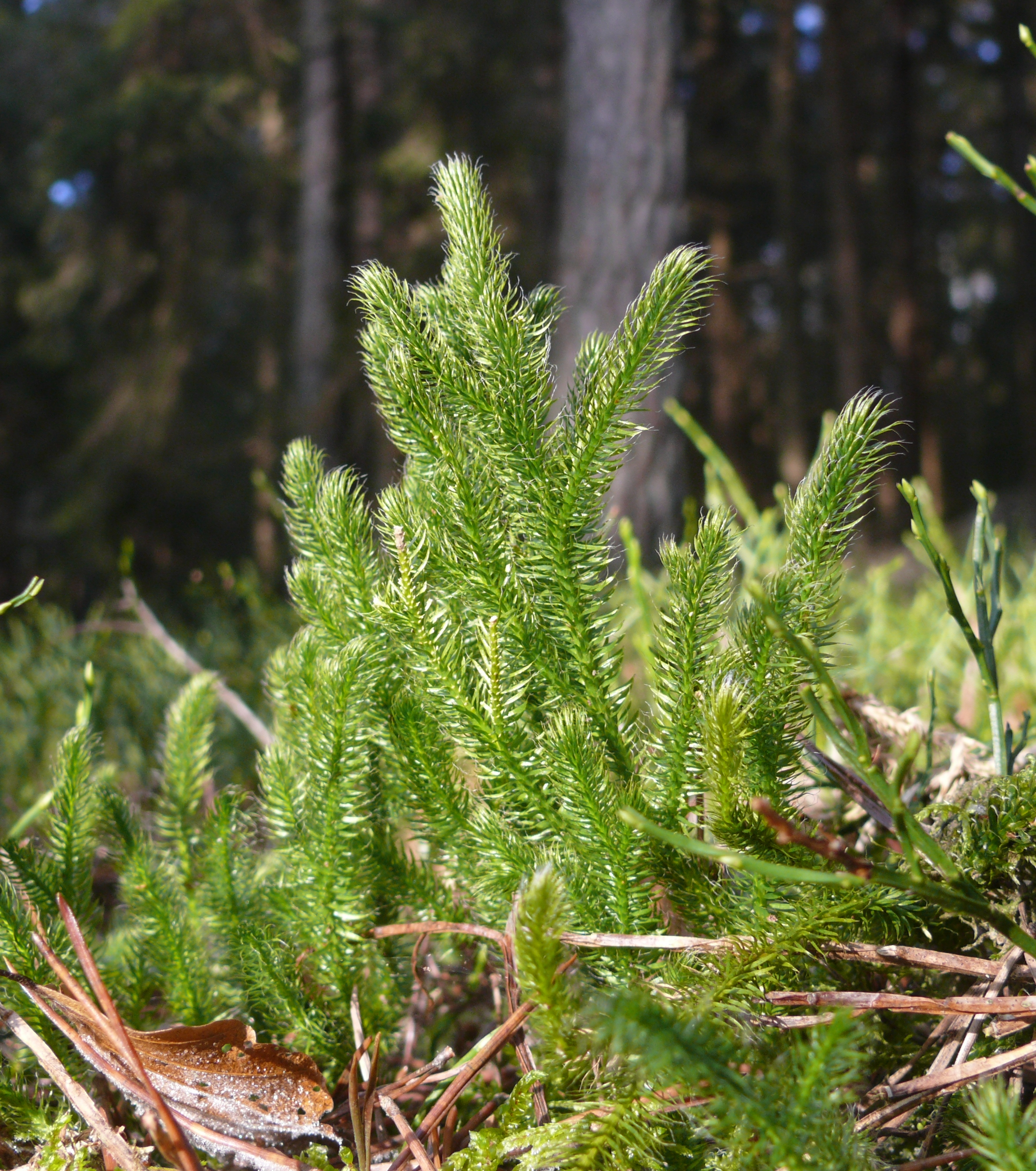
Common clubmoss (Lycopodium clavatum)

=== Clubmosses ===
Class: Lycopodiopsida Order: Lycopodiales Family: Lycopodiaceae

- Alpine clubmoss, Diphasiastrum alpinum
- Chinese clubmoss, Huperzia chinensis
- Common clubmoss, Lycopodium clavatum
- Northern bog clubmoss, Lycopodiella inundata
- One-cone clubmoss, Lycopodium lagopus
- Pacific clubmoss, Huperzia haleakalae
- Sitka clubmoss, Diphasiastrum sitchense
- Stiff clubmoss, Spinulum annotinum
- Trailing clubmoss, Diphasiastrum complanatum
- Tree groundpine, Dendrolycopodium dendroideum
- Western clubmoss, Huperzia occidentalis

=== Quillworts ===
Class: Isoetopsida Order: Isoetales, Family: Isoetaceae

- Bolander's quillwort, Isoetes bolanderi
- Howell's quillwort, Isoetes howellii
- Nuttall's quillwort, Isoetes nuttallii
- Spiny-spored quillwort, Isoetes echinospora
- Western quillwort, Isoetes occidentalis

=== Spike-mosses ===
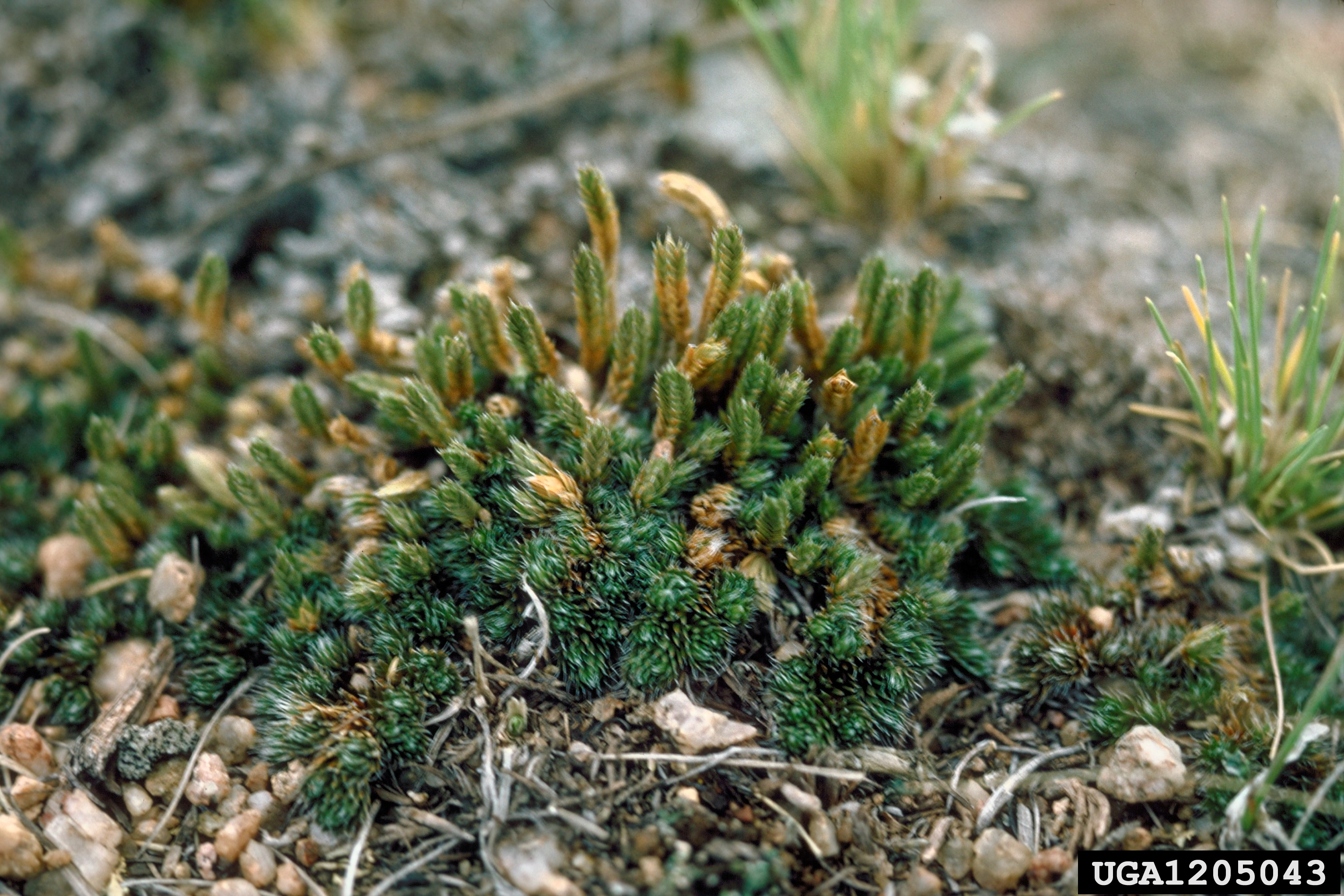
Lesser spikemoss (Selaginella densa)

Class: Isoetopsida Order: Selaginellales, Family: Selaginellaceae

- Lesser spikemoss, Selaginella densa
- Low spikemoss, Selaginella selaginoides
- Wallace's spikemoss, Selaginella wallacei
- Watson's spikemoss, Selaginella watsonii

== Mosses ==
=== Granite mosses ===
Class: Andreaeopsida Order: Andreaeales, Family: Andreaeaceae

- Blytt's andreaea moss, Andreaea blyttii

=== Peat mosses ===
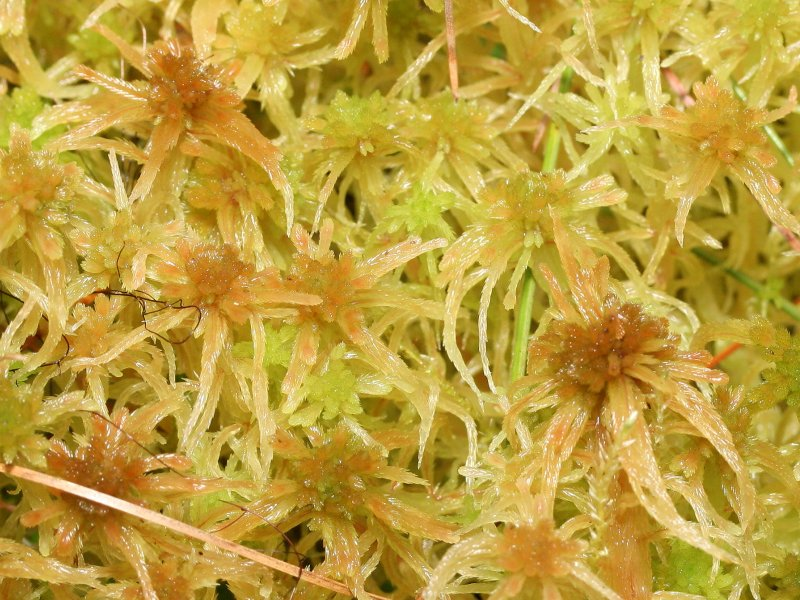
Narrowleaf peat moss (Sphagnum angustifolium)

Class: Sphagnopsida Order: Sphagnales, Family: Sphagnaceae

- Contorted sphagnum, Sphagnum contortum
- Flat-leaved bogmoss, Sphagnum platyphyllum
- Flat-topped bogmoss, Sphagnum fallax
- Fringed bogmoss, Sphagnum fimbriatum
- Girgensohn's sphagnum, Sphagnum girgensohnii
- Low sphagnum, Sphagnum compactum
- Magellan's peat moss, Sphagnum magellanicum
- Mendocino peat moss, Sphagnum mendocinum
- Barrowleaf peat moss, Sphagnum angustifolium
- Rusty peat moss, Sphagnum fuscum
- Sphagnum moss, Sphagnum centrale
- Streamside sphagnum moss, Sphagnum riparium
- Wulf's peat moss, Sphagnum wulfianum

=== Haircap mosses ===
Class: Polytrichopsida Order: Polytrichales, Family: Polytrichaceae

- Lyall's polytrichum moss, Meiotrichum lyallii
- Northern haircap, Polytrichum sexangulare
- Oligotrichum moss, Oligotrichum aligerum

=== True mosses ===
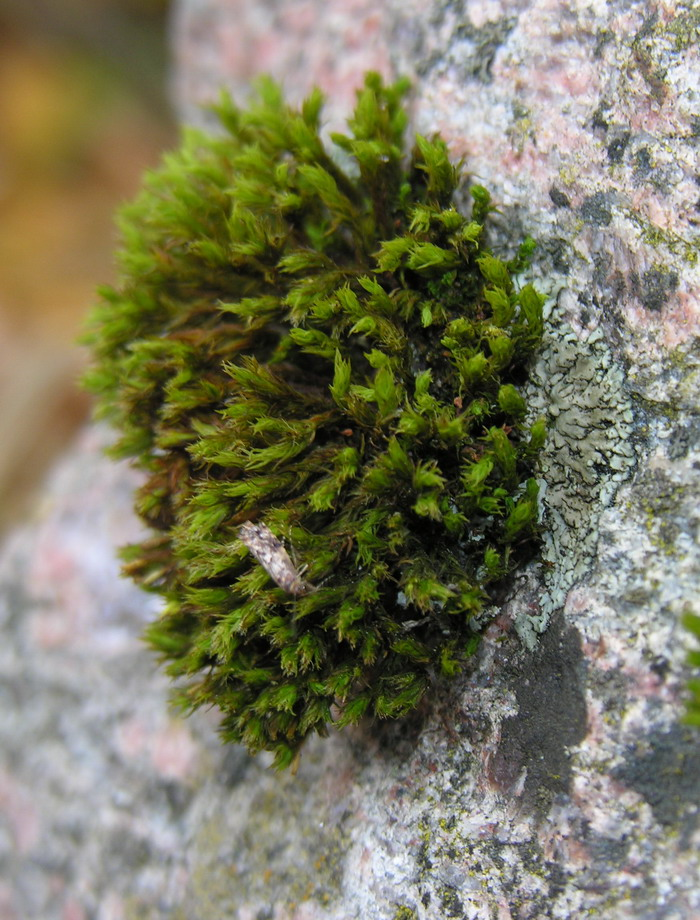
a moss of genus Orthotrichum

Class: Bryopsida

- Order: Hypnales, Family: Amblystegiaceae
  - Campylium moss, Campylium polygamum
  - Cardot's campylium moss, Campylium cardotii
  - Hygroamblystegium moss, Hygroamblystegium noterophilum
  - Hygrohypnum moss, Hygrohypnum cochlearifolium
  - Hygrohypnum moss, Hygrohypnum duriusculum
  - Limprichtia moss, Limprichtia revolvens
  - Pointed spear-moss, Calliergonella cuspidata
  - Pseudocalliergon moss, Pseudocalliergon turgescens
  - Richardson's calliergon moss, Calliergon richardsonii
  - Sarmenthypnum moss, Sarmenthypnum sarmentosum
  - Scorpidium moss, Scorpidium scorpioides
  - Smith's hygrohypnum moss, Hygrohypnum smithii
  - Three-ranked spear-moss, Pseudocalliergon trifarium
  - Varnished hook-moss, Hamatocaulis vernicosus
  - Warnstorfia moss, Warnstorfia exannulata
- Order: Hypnales, Family: Brachytheciaceae
  - Barnes' eurhynchium moss, Eurhynchium pulchellum var. barnesii
  - Cedar moss, Sciuro-hypnum oedipodium
  - Leiberg's brachythecium moss, Brachythecium leibergii
  - Long-beaked water feathermoss, Platyhypnidium riparioides
  - Matted feather moss, Brachythecium populeum
  - Nelson's brachythecium moss, Brachythecium nelsonii
  - Sharp point moss, Brachythecium oxycladon
  - Steerecleus moss, Steerecleus serrulatus
  - Stiff brachythecium moss, Brachythecium turgidum
  - Trachybryum moss, Trachybryum megaptilum
- Order: Bryales, Family: Bryaceae

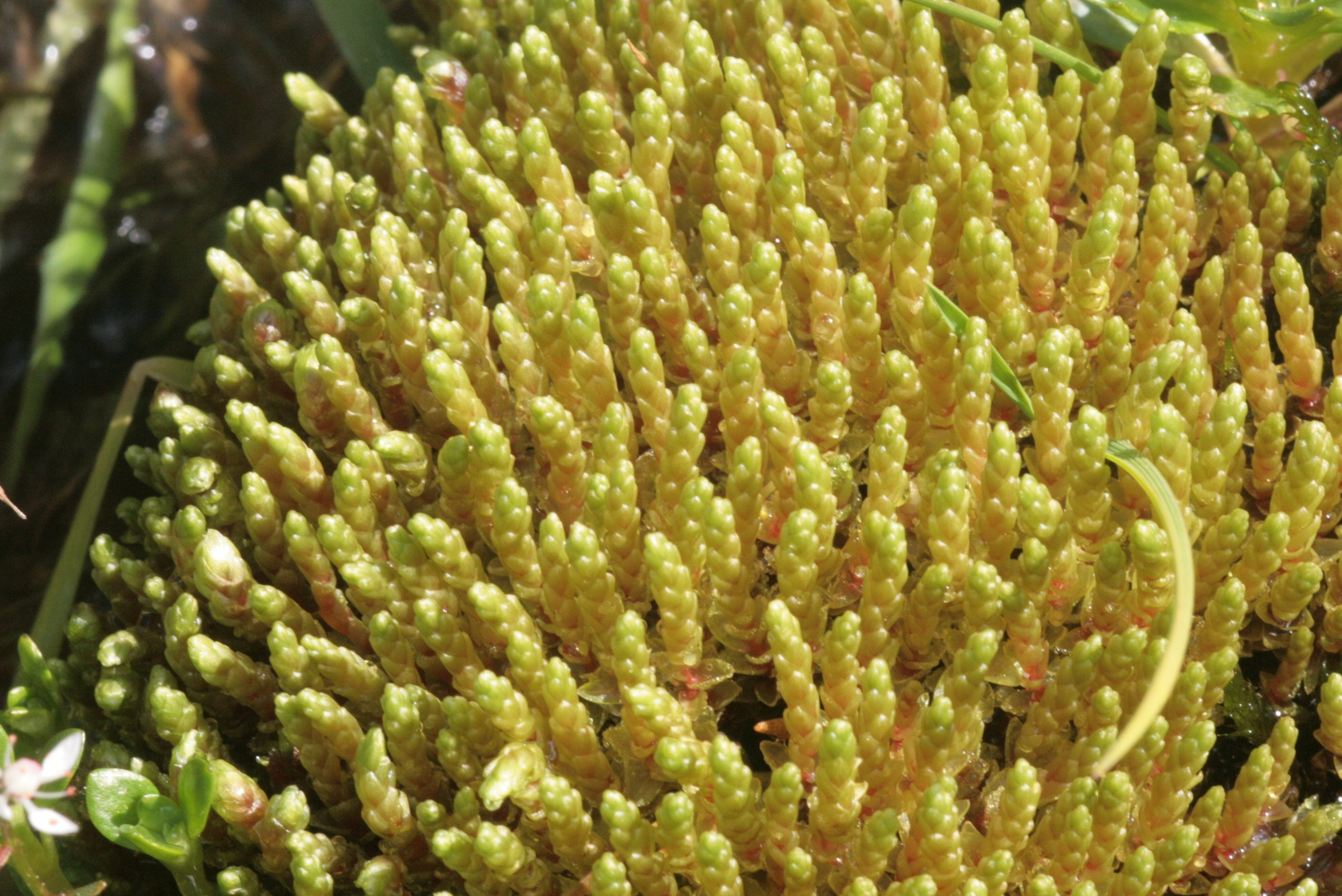
Schleicher's bryum moss (Bryum schleicheri)

  - Alpine bryum moss, Bryum alpinum
  - Arctic bryum moss, Bryum arcticum
  - Bryum moss, Bryum calobryoides
  - Bryum moss, Bryum calophyllum
  - Round-leaved bryum moss, Bryum cyclophyllum
  - Bryum moss, Bryum dichotomum
  - Bryum moss, Bryum lonchocaulon
  - Bryum moss, Bryum pallens
  - Drummond's pohlia moss, Pohlia drummondii
  - Obtuseleaf pohlia moss, Pohlia obtusifolia
  - Lagiobryum moss, Plagiobryum demissum
  - Pohlia moss, Pohlia vexans
  - Schleicher's bryum moss, Bryum schleicheri
  - Waterfall copper moss, Haplodontium macrocarpum
  - Zierian hump-moss, Plagiobryum zieri
- Order: Bryales, Family: Catoscopiaceae
  - Black golf club moss, Catoscopium nigritum
- Order: Dicranales, Family: Dicranaceae
  - Acuteleaf dicranum moss, Dicranum acutifolium
  - Blytt's kiaeria moss, Kiaeria blyttii
  - Cynodontium moss, Cynodontium tenellum
  - Dicranella moss, Dicranella palustris
  - Dicranella moss, Dicranella subulata
  - Dicranoweisia moss, Dicranoweisia cirrata
  - Dicranum moss, Dicranum angustum
  - Dicranum moss, Dicranum spadiceum
  - Fragile leaf dicranum moss, Dicranum fragilifolium
  - Greville's dicranella moss, Dicranella grevilleana
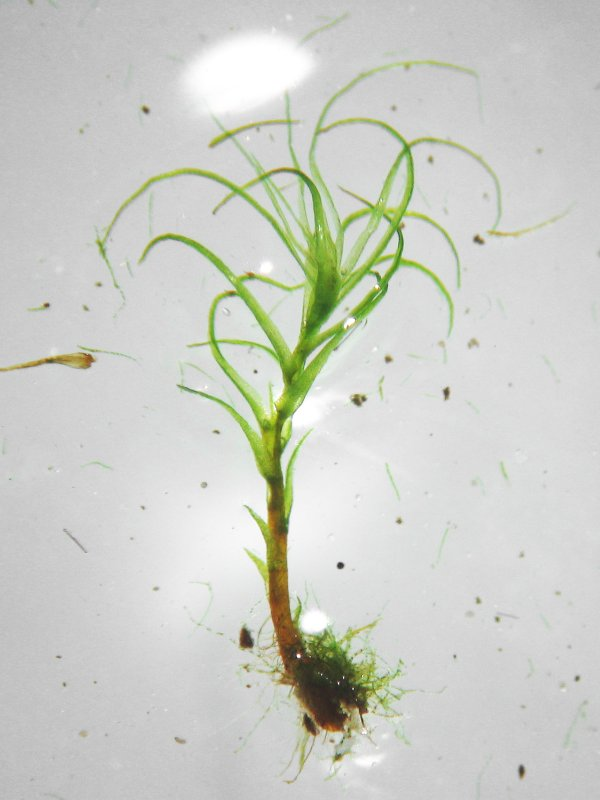
    silky forklet moss (Dicranella heteromalla)
  - Longleaf paraleucobryum moss, Paraleucobryum longifolium
  - Olympic dichodontium moss, Dichodontium olympicum
  - Paraleucobryum moss, Paraleucobryum enerve
  - Schreber's dicranella moss, Dicranella schreberiana
  - Sickle kiaeria moss, Kiaeria falcata
  - Silky forklet moss, Dicranella heteromalla
  - Starke's kiaeria moss, Kiaeria starkei
- Order: Dicranales, Family: Ditrichaceae
  - Ambiguous ditrichum moss, Ditrichum ambiguum
  - Cylindrical trichodon, Trichodon cylindricus
  - Incline distichium moss, Distichium inclinatum
- Order: Hypnales, Family: Fabroniaceae
  - Silver hair moss, Fabronia pusilla
- Order: Fissidentales, Family: Fissidentaceae
  - phoenix moss, Fissidens fontanus
- Order: Leucodontales, Family: Fontinalaceae
  - antifever fontinalis moss, Fontinalis antipyretica
- Order: Funariales, Family: Funariaceae
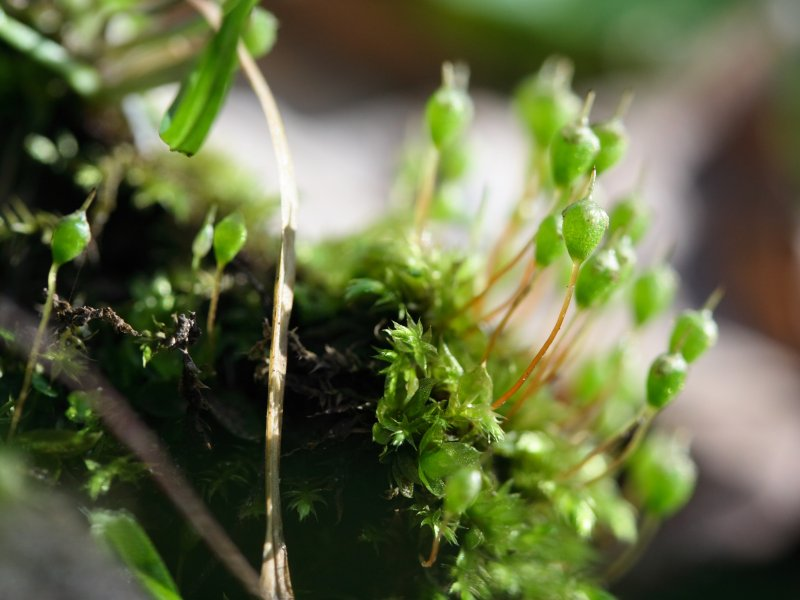
  common bladder moss (Physcomitrium pyriforme)
  - American funaria moss, Funaria americana
  - common bladder moss, Physcomitrium pyriforme
  - Hooker's physcomitrium moss, Physcomitrium hookeri
  - rusty cord-moss, Entosthodon rubiginosus
- Order: Grimmiales, Family: Grimmiaceae
  - Agassiz's schistidium moss, Schistidium agassizii
  - aquatic racomitrium moss, Racomitrium aquaticum
  - Britton's dry rock moss, Grimmia brittoniae
  - curved dry rock moss, Grimmia incurva
  - fascicled racomitrium moss, Racomitrium fasciculare
  - grimmia dry rock moss, Grimmia laevigata
  - grimmia dry rock moss, Grimmia mollis
  - pygmy racomitrium moss, Niphotrichum pygmaeum
  - racomitrium moss, Bucklandiella brevipes
  - racomitrium moss, Racomitrium heterostichum
  - varied racomitrium moss, Racomitrium varium
  - western racomitrium moss, Racomitrium occidentale
- Order: Hypnales, Family: Hypnaceae
  - Callicladium moss, Callicladium haldanianum
  - herzogiella moss, Herzogiella striatella
  - herzogiella moss, Herzogiella turfacea
  - hypnum moss, Hypnum callichroum
  - hypnum moss, Hypnum procerrimum
  - platygyrium moss, Platygyrium repens
  - recurved hypnum moss, Hypnum recurvatum
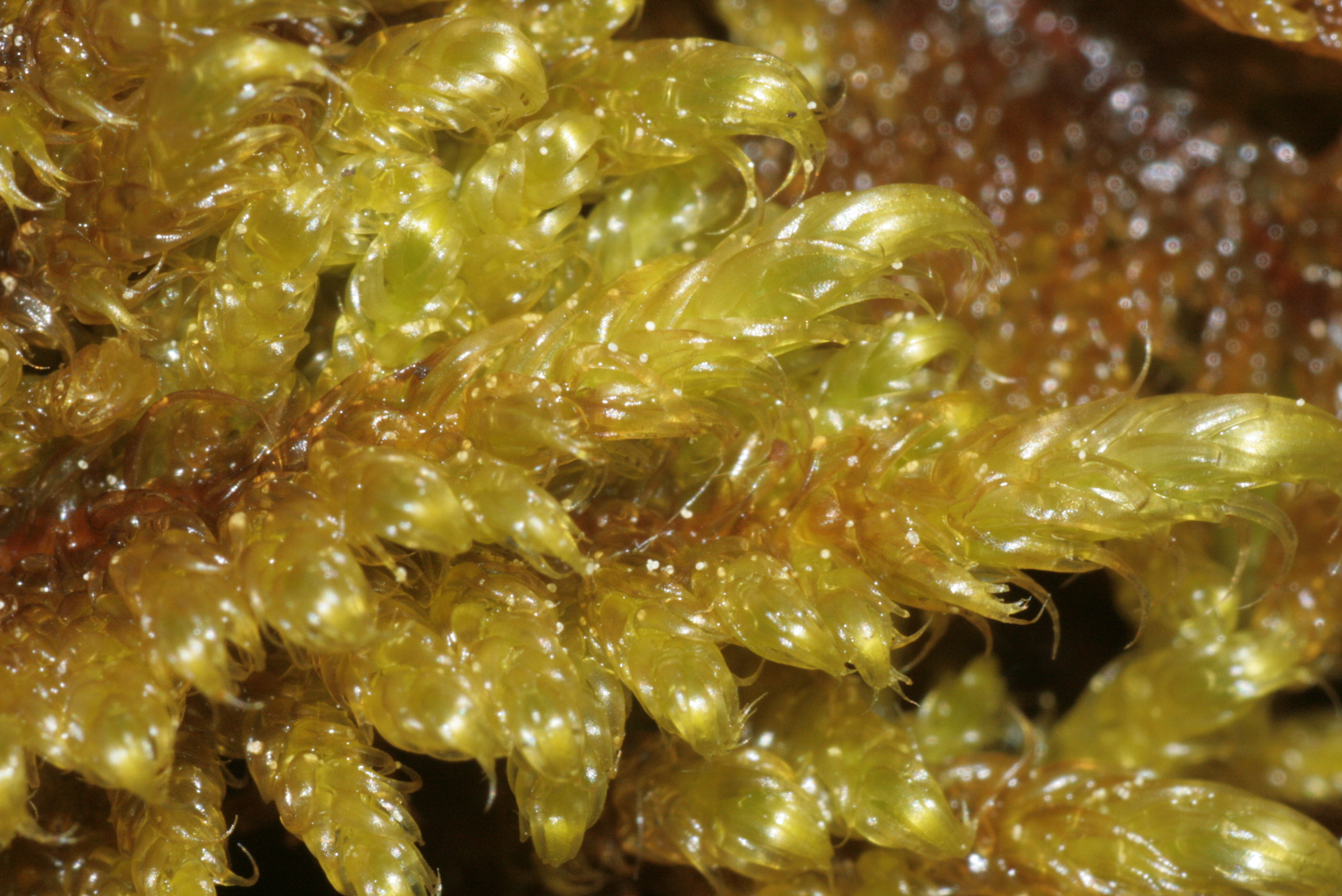
    hypnum moss (Hypnum procerrimum)
- Order: Hypnales, Family: Leskeaceae
  - Claopodium moss, Claopodium crispifolium
- Order: Leucodontales, Family: Leucodontaceae
  - Dendroalsia moss, Dendroalsia abietina
- Order: Bryales, Family: Meesiaceae
  - Short-tooth hump-moss, Amblyodon dealbatus
  - Angled paludella moss, Paludella squarrosa
  - Meesia moss, Meesia longiseta
  - Three-ranked hump-moss, Meesia triquetra
  - Broad-nerved hump-moss, Meesia uliginosa
- Order: Bryales, Family: Mniaceae
  - cinclidium moss, Cinclidium stygium
  - Leucolepis umbrella moss, Leucolepis acanthoneuron
- Order: Leucodontales, Family: Neckeraceae
  - Douglas' neckera moss, Neckera douglasii
- Order: Orthotrichales, Family: Orthotrichaceae
  - Mougeot's amphidium moss, Amphidium mougeotii
  - orthotrichum moss, Orthotrichum praemorsum
- Order: Pottiales, Family: Pottiaceae
  - Bartram's tortula moss, Syntrichia bartramii
  - convoluted barbula moss, Barbula convoluta
  - didymodon moss, Didymodon brachyphyllus
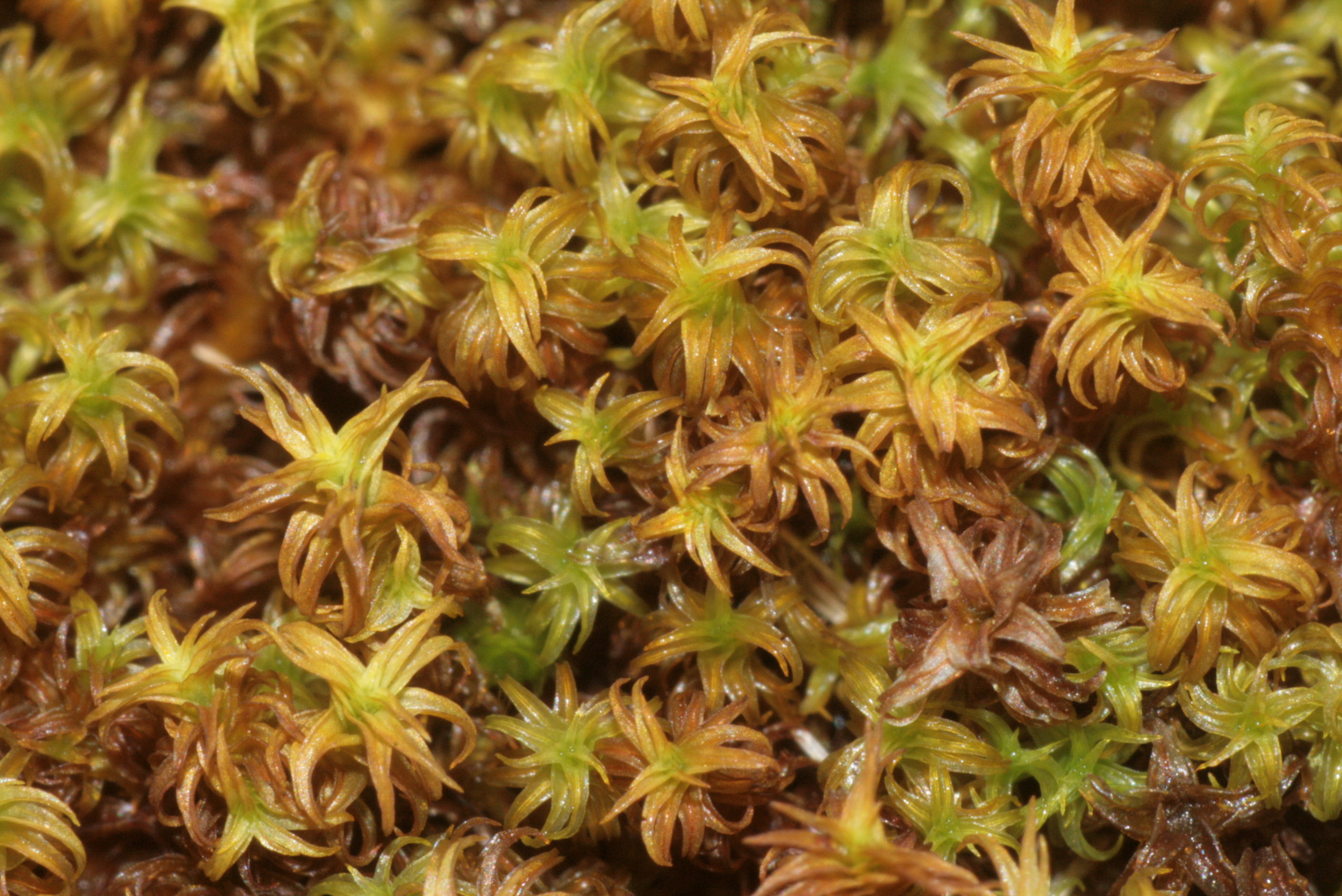
    didymodon moss (Didymodon ferrugineus)
  - didymodon moss, Didymodon ferrugineus
  - Heim's desmatodon moss, Hennediella heimii
  - flamingo moss, Tortula cernua
  - lamella pterygoneurum moss, Pterygoneurum lamellatum
  - lime-seep eucladium moss, Eucladium verticillatum
  - Norwegian tortula moss, Tortula norvegica
  - obtuseleaf desmatodon moss, Desmatodon obtusifolius
  - oxystegus moss, Trichostomum tenuirostre
  - pseudocrossidium moss, Pseudocrossidium obtusulum
  - rigid didymodon moss, Didymodon rigidulus var. gracilis
  - sessile pterygoneurum moss, Pterygoneurum subsessile
  - short-beaked aloe-moss (Aloina brevirostris)
  - toothed phascum moss, Phascum cuspidatum
  - tortella moss, Tortella inclinata
  - tortula moss (Syntrichia papillosissima)
  - tortula moss, Tortula caninervis
  - tortula moss, Tortula muralis
  - twisted tortella moss, Tortella tortuosa
  - wideleaf crumia moss, Crumia latifolia
  - wideleaf stegonia moss, Stegonia latifolia
- Order: Hypnales, Family: Pterigynandraceae
  - myurella moss, Myurella tenerrima
- Order: Grimmiales, Family: Ptychomitraceae
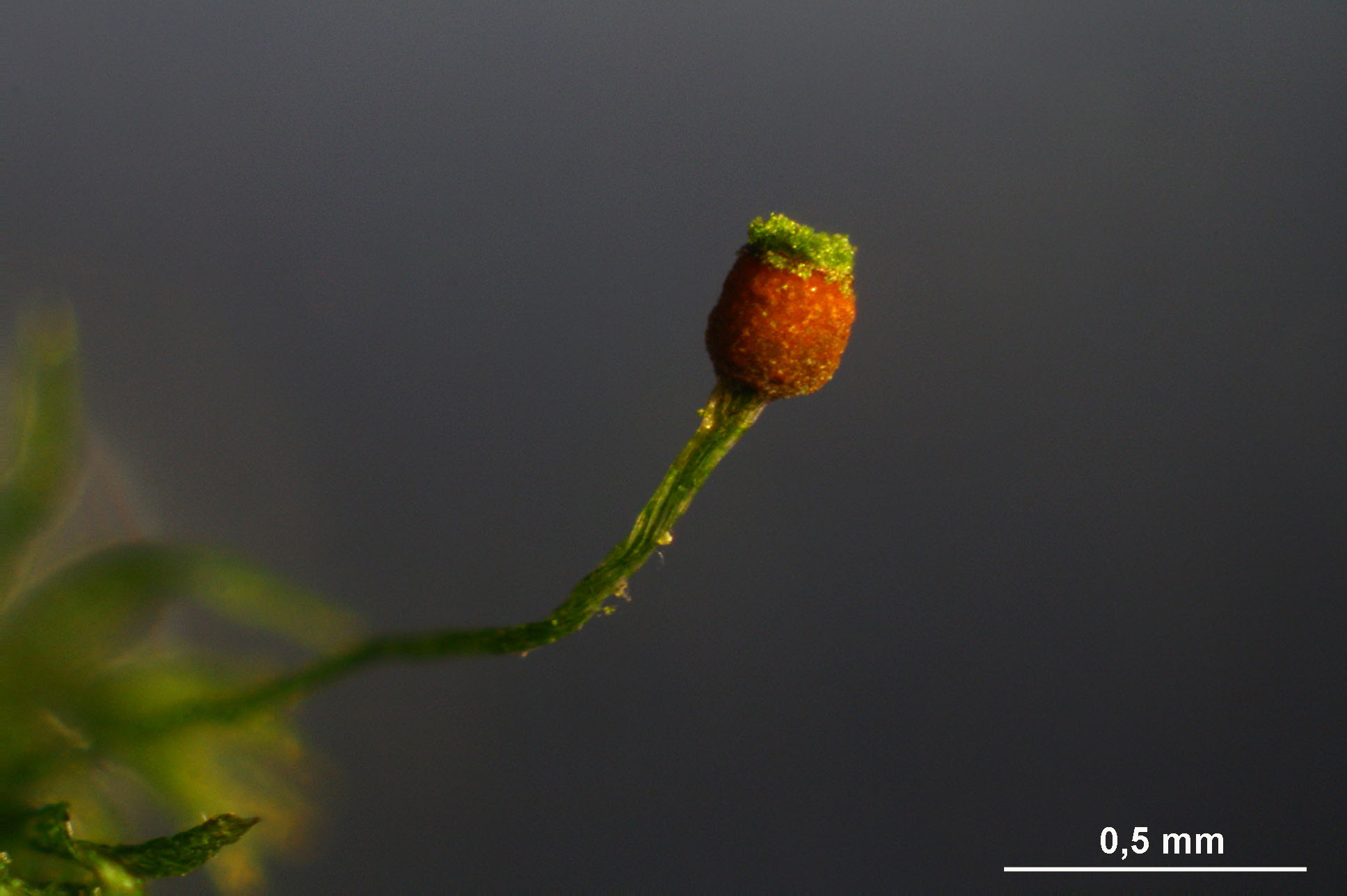
  luminous moss (Schistostega pennata)
  - Gardner's ptychomitrium moss, Ptychomitrium gardneri
- Order: Schistostegales, Family: Schistostegaceae
  - luminous moss, Schistostega pennata
- Order: Seligeriales, Family: Seligeraceae
  - acute blindia moss, Blindia acuta
  - Donn's small limestone moss, Seligeria donniana
- Order: Funariales, Family: Splachnaceae
  - acuminate dung moss, Tayloria acuminata
  - entire-leaf nitrogen moss, Tetraplodon mnioides
  - lingulate dung moss, Tayloria lingulata
  - pinkstink dung moss, Splachnum sphaericum
  - serrate dung moss, Tayloria serrata
  - toothed-leaf nitrogen moss, Tetraplodon angustatus
- Order: Hypnales, Family: Thamnobryaceae
  - Bigelow's porotrichum moss, Porotrichum bigelovii
  - Necker's thamnobryum moss, Thamnobryum neckeroides
- Order: Bryales, Family: Timmiaceae
  - Norwegian timmia moss, Timmia norvegica

== See also ==
- Coniferous plants of Montana
- Lichens of Montana
- Monocotyledons of Montana
