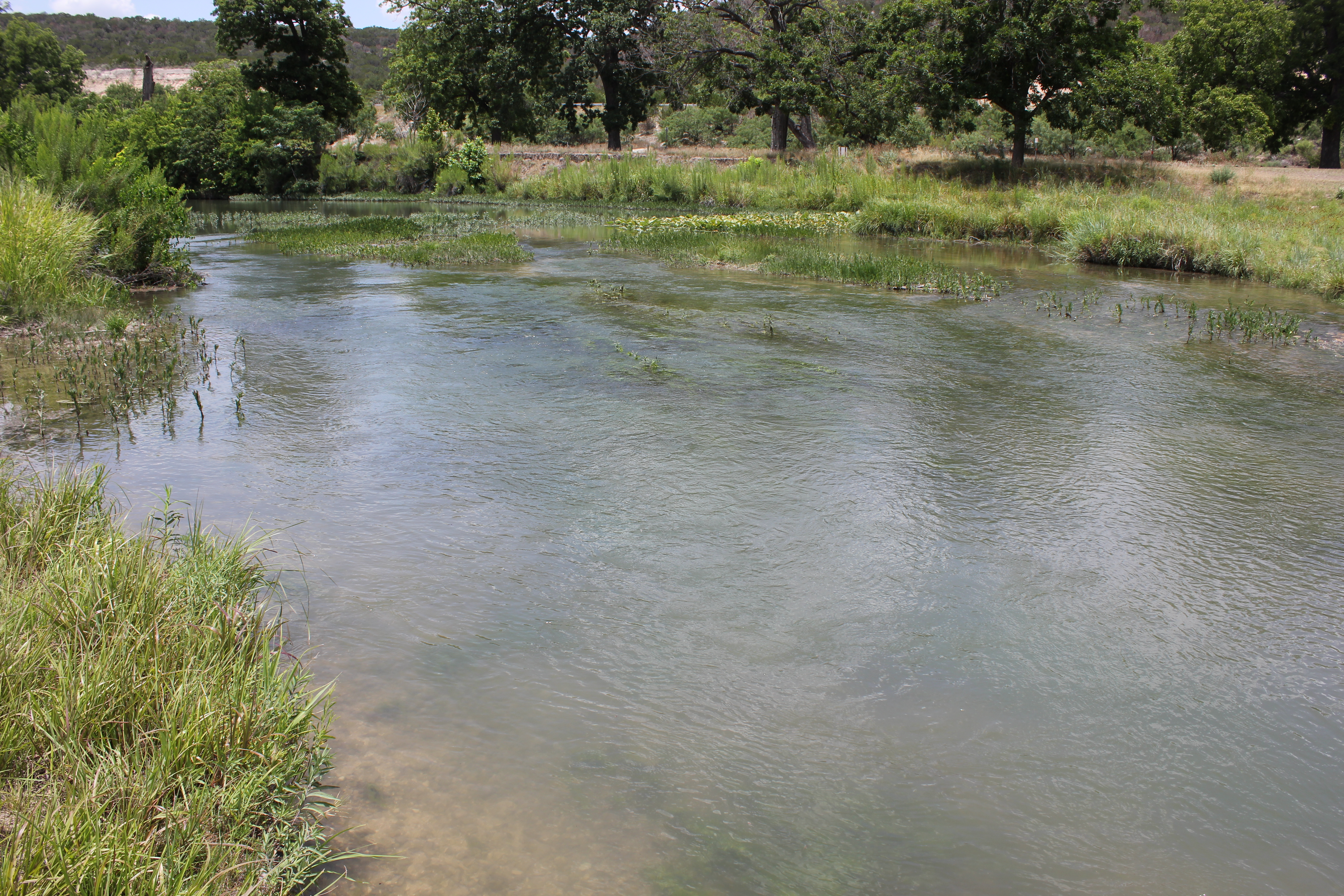
- South Llano River State Park

Conservation status
- Vulnerable (IUCN 3.1)

- Critically Imperiled (NatureServe)

Scientific classification
- Kingdom: Plantae
- Division: Bryophyta
- Class: Bryopsida
- Subclass: Bryidae
- Order: Hypnales
- Family: Brachytheciaceae
- Genus: Donrichardsia
- Species: D. macroneuron

Binomial name
- Donrichardsia macroneuron (Grout) H.A.Crum & L.E.Anderson

Synonyms
- Eurhynchium macroneuron (Grout) H.A.Crum; Hygroamblystegium macroneuron Grout; Oxyrrhynchium macroneuron (Grout) J.T.Wynns

= Donrichardsia macroneuron =

Species of moss

Donrichardsia macroneuron, also known as the South Llano springs moss, is an aquatic moss found in Texas. It is listed as a vulnerable species by the IUCN Red List. The moss is found in a relatively small area, only in the South Llano River, with two general locations being in the counties of Kimble and Edwards.

== Description ==
The South Llano springs moss color is mainly determined by sun exposure, being yellow-green in the sun and a range of black-brown or blue-green on shaded rocks. The stems of the moss are 3–14 cm (1.2–5.5 in) in length, with branchings extending as far as 10 mm (0.39 in).

== Habitat ==
The moss grows most often on rocks that are in the water of the South Llano River.

== Taxonomy ==
The South Llano springs moss was first identified by A.J. Grout and L.E. Anderson in 1933, after being collected in 1932. It was later described slightly differently due to its characteristics by H.A. Crum in 1969, but became a distinct species after further investigations in 1979. Originally thought to have gone extinct due to a nearby dam being erected in 1954, Donrichardsia macroneuron was found to have bounced back in March 1978.

== Conservation ==
The moss was first proposed as an endangered species in September 2021, but was not officially listed until May 2023. Specific habitat protections were originally presented, but were scraped due to concerns from private land owners. Since then, pumping and further development of the surrounding areas have affected the aquifer the moss relies on, aiding to its decline in numbers over the last few years. A history of droughts, particularly in the 1950s, have also threatened the continuation of the species due to habitat degradation. At present, there are no known sexually reproducing populations of the moss, all current groupings are thought to be asexually replicated from a single plant.
