= William Land =

William Land may refer to:

- William Land (athlete), English track and field athlete
- William Jesse Goad Land, American botanist, inventor, and professor
- Bill Land, American Negro league outfielder
- William Land (philanthropist), also mayor of Sacramento 1898 to 1899.

== See also ==
- William E.M. Lands, American nutritional biochemist
