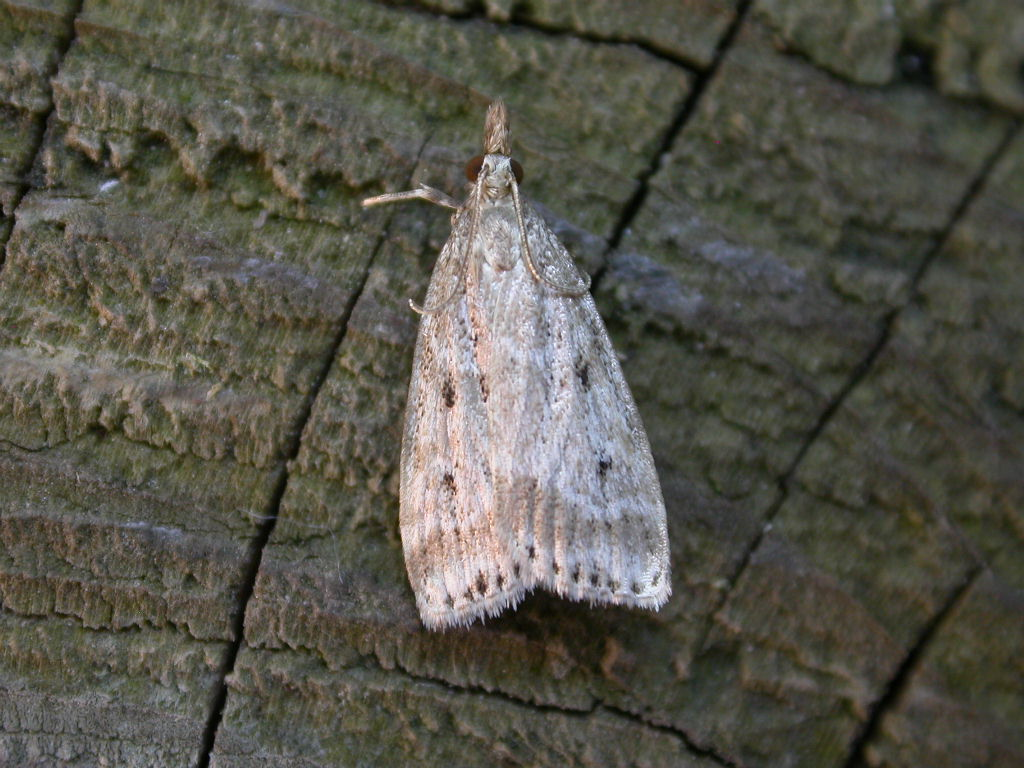

Scientific classification
- Kingdom: Animalia
- Phylum: Arthropoda
- Class: Insecta
- Order: Lepidoptera
- Family: Crambidae
- Genus: Eudonia
- Species: E. pallida

Binomial name
- Eudonia pallida (J. Curtis, 1827)

Synonyms
- Witlesia pallida; Eudorea pallida J. Curtis, 1827; Witlesia denigrata Costantini, 1923; Eudorea oertzeniella Herrich-Schäffer, [1848]; Eudorea oertziella Heydenreich, 1851

= Eudonia pallida =

Species of moth

Eudonia pallida is a species of moth of the family Crambidae. It was described by John Curtis in 1827 and is known from most of Europe. Its alternative English name is the Marsh Grey.

The wingspan is about 18 mm. The forewings are a very pale brownish ochreous color or just brownish, mixed with pale shades of white, and sprinkled with dark brown. The lines are white, the first nearly obsolete, the second slightly sinuate. It is the palest of all of the Scopariinae subfamily

Adults are on wing in April to late September in one generation per year.

The larvae feed on mosses and lichens at ground level. It has been reared from larvae found amongst the moss Calliergonella cuspidata.
