= Ruth M. Addoms =

American botanist

- Born: Ruth Margery Addoms; May 23, 1896; Haworth, New Jersey, U.S.
- Died: August 29, 1951 (aged 54 or 55); Brooklyn, New York, U.S.
- Education: Packer Collegiate Institute; Wellesley College; University of Wisconsin
- Scientific career
- Fields: Botany
- Workplaces: Duke University

Ruth Margery Addoms (May 23, 1896 – August 29, 1951) was an American botanist at Duke University specializing in the study of plant anatomy and plant physiology. She contributed to the study of growth-promoting substances in plants.

== Early life and education ==
Addoms was born in Haworth, New Jersey, to Lucy M. (Copeland) Addoms and William Henry Addoms, who was an exporter in Brooklyn, New York. Her younger sister, Elizabeth, became director of the physical therapy program at New York University.

Addoms attended Packer Collegiate Institute, in Brooklyn. She received her A.B. degree from Wellesley College in 1918. In 1921, she received her master's degree in botany from Wellesley. In 1926, Addoms earned her Doctorate from the University of Wisconsin.

== Scientific career ==
After earning her PhD, Addoms taught at Wellesley College and the University of Wisconsin. In 1930, she became a professor at Duke University, playing a crucial role in the development of Duke's Department of Botany and the Women's College. She was an active teacher and researcher for twenty years until her sudden death in 1951 at age 54 or 55. During her two decades at Duke, Addoms, with the help of her colleague Lewis Edward Anderson, built the institution's first general botany course.

Addoms was one of the eight original members of Duke's Botany department, which split from the Biology Department in 1935. In that time, she trained one PhD and helped the chair, Dr. Hugo L. Blomquist, to build and promote the fledgling department.

She contributed to several fields of plant anatomy and physiology. Most notably, Addoms was interested in promoting plant growth promotion. She contributed to several textbooks on growth-promoting chemicals, as well as a general textbook on botany.

== Death ==
Addoms was visiting her sister Elizabeth in Brooklyn when she was stricken suddenly. She died at Methodist Hospital on August 29, 1951. She was survived by her mother, sister, and two brothers.

== Honors and legacy ==
Addoms was active both in civil and academic life. During World War II, she was the chairman of the Durham, North Carolina chapter of the British War Relief Society and a member of the city's Civil Defense organization during World War II. She served as an active member of the local Girl Scout Council since its formation.

Professionally, she was a member and leader of many professional organization, such as Phi Beta Kappa, Sigma Xi, Sigma Delta Epsilon, the Botanical Society of America, and was a charter member of the American Society of Plant Physiologists.

In 1956, Duke Women's College would build a new dormitory partly in her name, the Gilbert-Addoms Residence Hall commemorating her service the college, to the Duke department of Botany, and her contributions to the field.

== Selected publications ==
- Avery, George S.; Johnson, Elizabeth Bindloss; Addoms, Ruth M. (1947) [1947]. Hormones and Horticulture: The Use of Special Chemicals in the Control of Plant Growth. New York: McGraw-Hill Book Co.
- Emma L., Fisk; Addoms, Ruth M. (1930) [1928]. A Laboratory Manual of General Botany. New York: Macmillan. OCLC 01057945.
- Addoms, Ruth M. (March 1927). "The Effect of the Hydrogen Ion on the Protoplasm of the Root Hairs of Wheat". American Journal of Botany. 10 (4): 211–220. doi:10.2307/2435334. JSTOR 2435334.

== See also ==
- American Society of Plant Physiologists
- Botany
- Duke University
- Women in science
