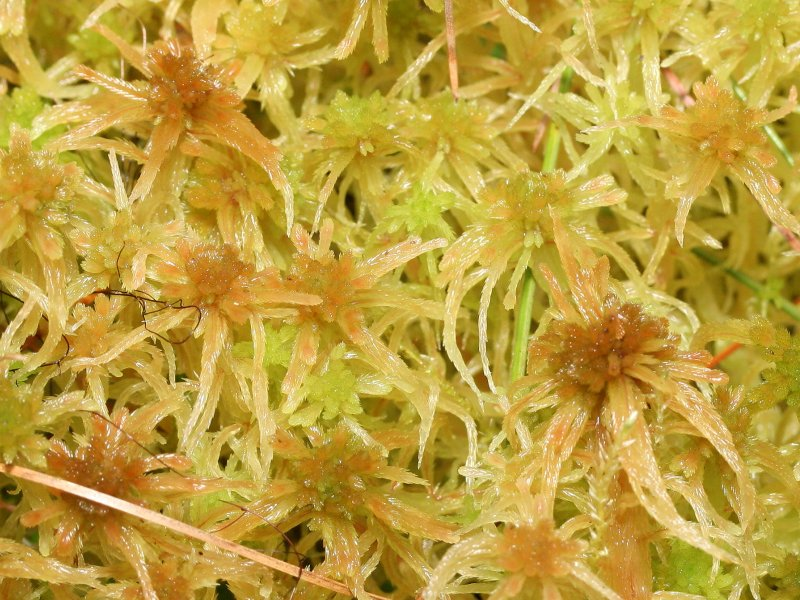

Scientific classification
- Kingdom: Plantae
- Division: Bryophyta
- Class: Sphagnopsida
- Order: Sphagnales
- Family: Sphagnaceae
- Genus: Sphagnum
- Species: S. angustifolium

Binomial name
- Sphagnum angustifolium (C.E.O.Jensen ex Russow) C.E.O.Jensen

Synonyms
- List: Sphagnum amblyphyllum var. parvifolium (Sendtn. ex Warnst.) Warnst.; Sphagnum angustifolium var. warnstorfii (C.E.O.Jensen) C.E.O.Jensen; Sphagnum apiculatum var. tenue (H.Klinggr.) C.E.O.Jensen; Sphagnum brevifolium var. angustifolium (Russow) Röll; Sphagnum brevifolium var. roellii (Schlieph.) Röll; Sphagnum brevifolium var. tenue (H.Klinggr.) Röll; Sphagnum brevifolium var. warnstorfii (C.E.O.Jensen) Röll; Sphagnum cuspidatum var. tenue (H.Klinggr.) Hérib.; Sphagnum elenkini Semenov; Sphagnum fallax var. angustifolium (Russow) Nyholm; Sphagnum flexuosum var. tenue (H.Klinggr.) Pilous; Sphagnum parvifolium (Sendtn. ex Warnst.) Warnst.; Sphagnum parvifolium var. tenue (H.Klinggr.) Warnst.; Sphagnum recurvum subsp. angustifolium Russow; Sphagnum recurvum var. angustifolium (Russow) Warnst.; Sphagnum recurvum var. parvifolium Sendtn. ex Warnst.; Sphagnum recurvum var. roellii Schlieph.; Sphagnum recurvum var. tenue H.Klinggr.; Sphagnum recurvum var. warnstorfii C.E.O.Jensen; Sphagnum amblyphyllum f. warnstorfii (C.E.O.Jensen) Warnst.; Sphagnum angustifolium var. squamosum (Ångstr.) C.E.O.Jensen; Sphagnum brevifolium var. squamosum (Ångstr.) Röll; Sphagnum intermedium var. broeckii Cardot; Sphagnum intermedium var. roellii Schlieph.; Sphagnum intermedium var. parvifolium (Sendtn. ex Warnst.) Guim.; Sphagnum intermedium var. rubricaule Warnst.; Sphagnum intermedium var. tenue (H.Klinggr.) Husn.; Sphagnum limprichtii var. parvifolium (Sendtn. ex Warnst.) Röll; Sphagnum parvifolium var. warnstorfii (C.E.O.Jensen) Zick.; Sphagnum recurvum var. broeckii (Cardot) Warnst.; Sphagnum recurvum var. rubricaule (Warnst.) Cardot; Sphagnum recurvum var. squamosum (Ångstr.) Warnst.; Sphagnum recurvum var. venustum C.E.O.Jensen; Sphagnum variabile f. squamosum Ångstr.; Sphagnum variabile var. tenue (H.Klinggr.) Warnst.; Sphagnum recurvum subsp. parvifolium (Sendtn. ex Warnst.) Bom. & Broth.; Sphagnum recurvum f. warnstorfii (C.E.O.Jensen) Warnst.

= Sphagnum angustifolium =

Fine bogmoss

Species of moss

Sphagnum angustifolium, the fine bogmoss, is a species of peat moss with a Holarctic distribution. A member of the S. recurvum species complex within Sphagnum section Cuspidata, it is a relatively small, green to yellowish moss that grows in wet, moderately nutrient-rich mires, typically forming carpets or growing intermixed with other peat moss species. The species can be distinguished from its close relatives by having no more than four branches per fascicle and distinctive large pores on its hanging branch leaves, though identification becomes more challenging in southern populations where morphological characteristics are less distinct.

An important ecosystem engineer in peatlands, S. angustifolium influences carbon cycling through its decay-resistant tissues and shows considerable resilience to climate change, maintaining stable growth patterns even under warmer and drier conditions. The species is dioicous, producing spore capsules in late summer, and invests significantly in chemical defences to protect its reproductive structures. It plays a key role in the ecological succession of peatlands, particularly in areas recovering from permafrost thaw, where it forms intermediate "lawn communities" that mark the transition from wet post-thaw conditions to drier hummock vegetation. Its genome of 395 megabases shows unique adaptations for bog environments, including specialised pathways to manage pH stress through hormone expression and cell transport mechanisms.

== Taxonomy ==
The plant was first described by Edmund Russow in 1890 as a subspecies of Sphagnum recurvum. Christian E.O. Jensen elevated it to the status of species in 1896. It has acquired many synonyms in its taxonomic history. Sphagnum angustifolium belongs to Sphagnum section Cuspidata and is part of the S. recurvum species complex, a taxonomically challenging group of morphologically similar species. The taxonomic status of S. angustifolium has been subject to varying interpretations over time.

The treatment of this species and its relatives has varied considerably among bryologists. In 1966, Pekka Isoviita recognised four distinct species within the complex: S. angustifolium, S. fallax, S. flexuosum, and S. recurvum. Under this treatment, what some authors recognised as S. brevifolium and S. isoviitae were included within a broader concept of S. fallax.

A more conservative approach was taken by Daniels and Eddy in 1985, who recognised only three species: S. angustifolium, S. flexuosum, and S. recurvum, with S. fallax and S. brevifolium treated as varieties of S. recurvum. At the other extreme, Kjell Ivar Flatberg (1991–1992) recognised six separate species within the complex. The most dramatic departure came from Howard Alvin Crum (1984, 1997), who considered all these taxa to be morphological variations of a single species.

More recent taxonomic treatments, as reflected in the European moss checklist, and the European Sphagnum checklist, recognise three distinct species: S. angustifolium, S. flexuosum, and S. fallax (with S. brevifolium and S. isoviitae included within S. fallax).

Modern molecular studies using microsatellite markers have supported this three-species treatment by demonstrating that S. angustifolium represents a distinct genetic entity, though it shows some genetic overlap with its close relative S. flexuosum. The species is particularly notable for showing increasing morphological variability in southern parts of its range, where identification becomes more challenging due to less distinct morphological characteristics. Genetic studies have shown that approximately 8–13% of specimens display intermediate or ambiguous morphological features, particularly in southern populations, though this variation does not correspond to genetic intermediacy between species.

Within the S. recurvum complex, S. angustifolium is most closely related to S. flexuosum, with which it shares some morphological and genetic similarities. However, molecular evidence confirms they are distinct species despite their morphological overlap. S. fallax, another member of the complex, is more distantly related and shows clearer genetic differentiation from both S. angustifolium and S. flexuosum.

Genomic analysis of S. angustifolium has revealed a chromosome-scale genome of 395 megabases organised into 20 chromosomes. The genome shows high collinearity (shared gene order) with its close relative S. divinum but displays no gene collinearity with any other sequenced land plants, demonstrating that Sphagnum represents a unique and previously unsampled lineage of land plant evolution. The species shows an unusually high recombination rate compared to vascular plants, with an average of 10–30 centimorgans per megabase, about ten times higher than most vascular plants. This high recombination rate may help facilitate adaptation to environmental stresses and aid in purging deleterious alleles.

== Description ==
=== General appearance ===
Sphagnum angustifolium is a relatively small peat moss that grows in either compact clusters or elongated forms. In natural conditions, whole plant length typically ranges from 47–140 mm (1 7/8–5 1/2 in), with a green (living) portion of 20–51 mm (13/16–2 in) and a brown (decaying) portion of 17–105 mm (11/16–4 1/8 in). The plant typically appears green or yellowish in colour, and to the untrained eye may resemble its close relatives S. recurvum, S. fimbriatum, or S. capillifolium. At the tips of each plant are well-developed head-like structures (capitula) with diameters typically ranging from 6.2–21.2 mm (1/4–13/16 in).

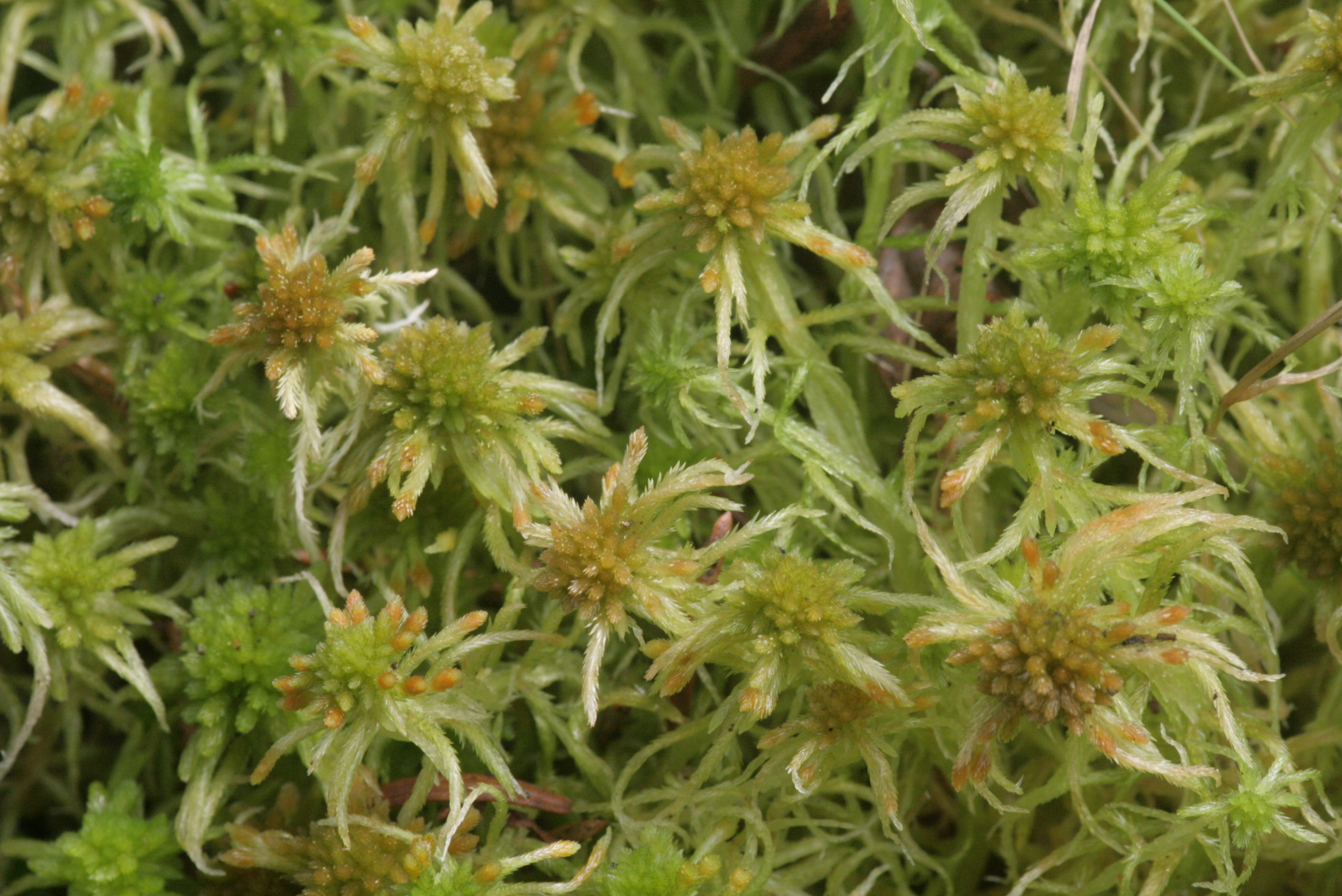
View of several characteristic star-shaped capitula showing their yellowish-green colouration

=== Stem and branch structure ===
The stem is slender, measuring 0.4–0.8 mm in diameter, and appears green, pale yellow, or faintly pink near the head. Along the stem are small triangular leaves, 0.7–1.0 mm long, that hang downward, featuring blunt tips that often appear worn and a distinctive broad border at their base.

The plant's branches grow in distinct clusters (fascicles) spaced along its stem. Each cluster contains exactly four branches—a key identifying feature that distinguishes it from similar species which may have up to five branches per cluster. Within each cluster, two branches spread outward whilst two hang downward (pendant branches). The spreading branches can be either short (in open, exposed areas) or long and tapering (in shaded areas), measuring 6–10 mm (1/4–3/8 in), occasionally reaching 17 mm (11/16 in). The pendant branches are typically longer, measuring 8–18 mm (5/16–11/16 in).

=== Leaf characteristics ===
The branch leaves are relatively small (1.1–1.6 mm long and 0.3–0.5 mm wide) and lance-shaped (lanceolate). They typically overlap each other closely, except in plants growing in shade, and may appear in five distinct rows. These leaves contain two types of cells: small green photosynthetic cells and larger clear cells (hyaline cells). When viewed in cross-section, the photosynthetic cells appear triangular and are partially enclosed by the larger hyaline cells, which feature various pores and gaps that help the plant absorb and retain water.

The most reliable microscopic feature for identifying S. angustifolium (except when comparing it with S. balticum) is the structure of its hanging branch leaves, which have distinctive large pores on their outer surface near the leaf tips. While some botanists consider the presence of translucent pink (sometimes described as red) colouration in the internal branch tissue to be a distinguishing feature of S. angustifolium, this characteristic can also appear in S. recurvum and, less commonly, in S. flexuosum and S. cuspidatum, making it an unreliable diagnostic feature.

Microscopic characteristics
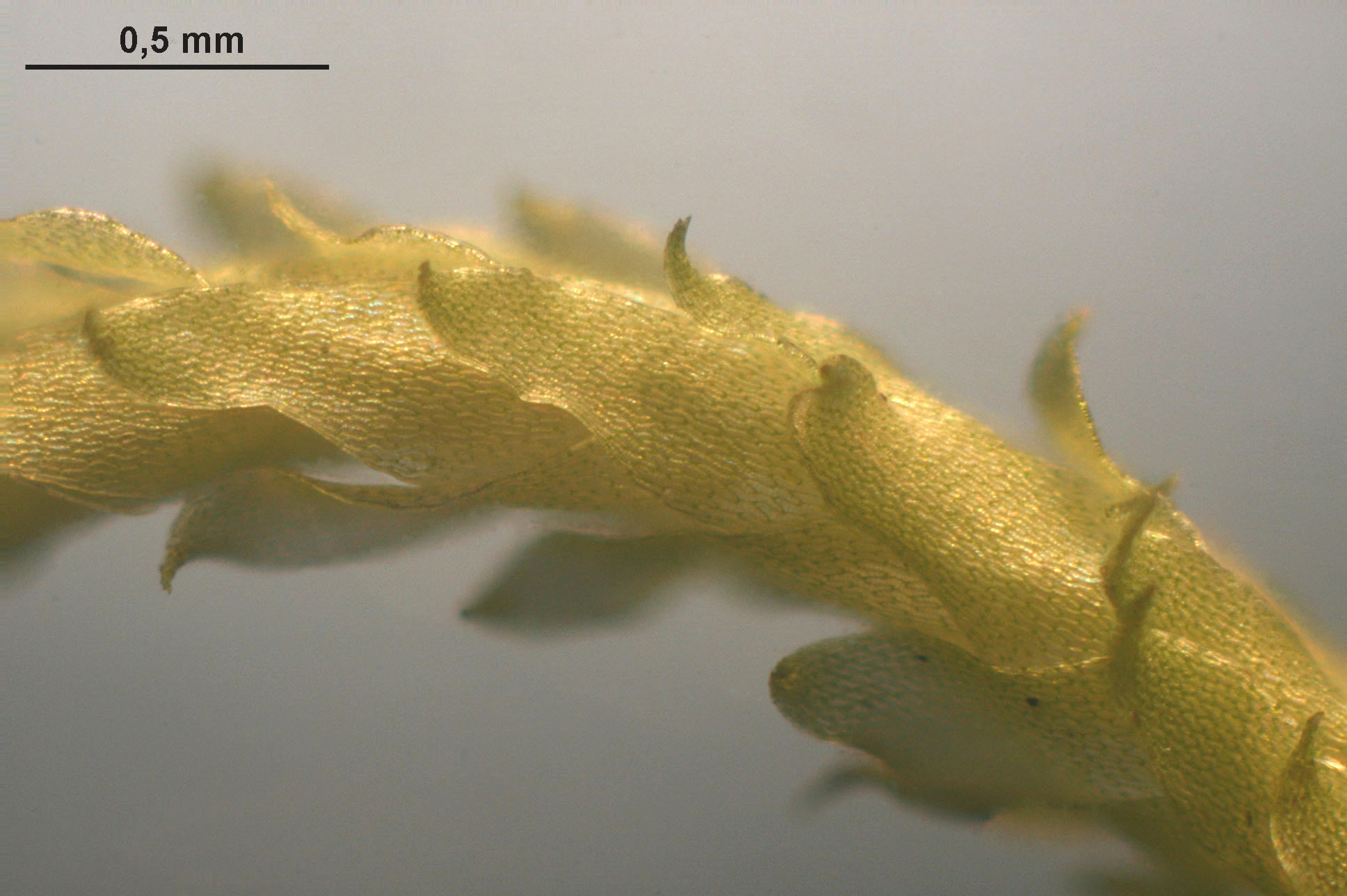
Branch leaf showing the characteristic arrangement of hyaline cells and leaf margins; scale bar 0.5 mm

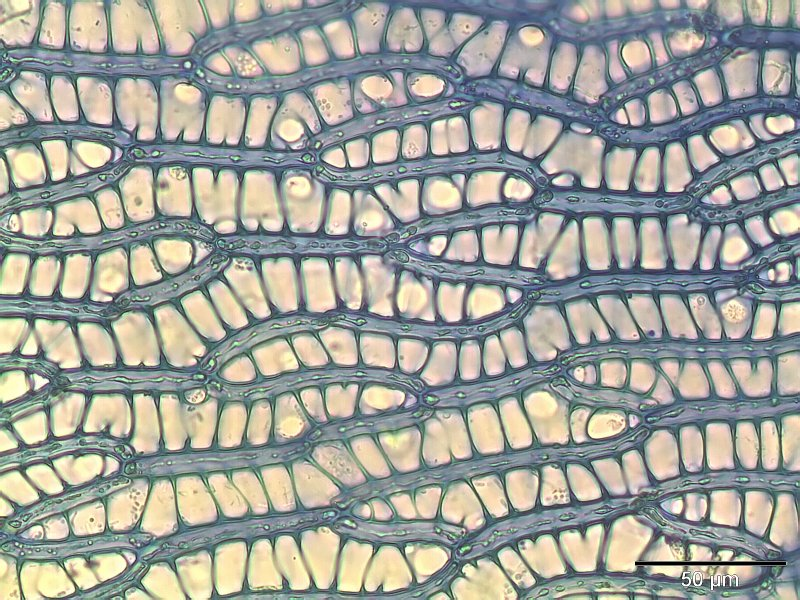
Leaf cross-section showing the characteristic arrangement of photosynthetic cells (narrow, blue-stained) between larger hyaline cells, scale bar 50 μm; 400X magnification

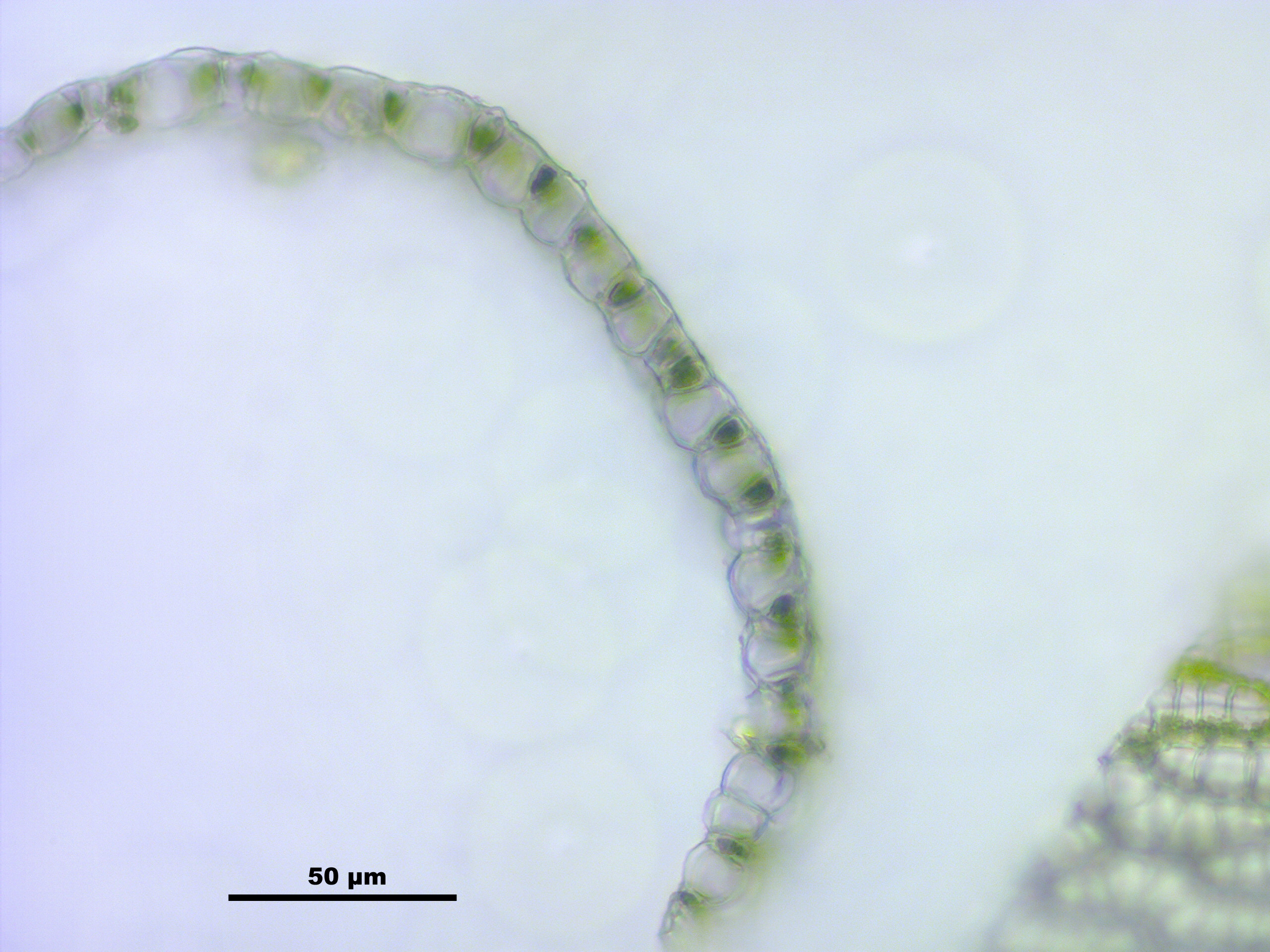
Cross-section of leaf margin with visible chloroplasts; scale bar 50 μm

=== Growth patterns ===
The species shows rapid growth in both lateral and vertical directions compared to many other Sphagnum species. While some members of the genus are restricted to specific microforms (surface height positions within a bog), S. angustifolium displays considerable adaptability, growing across a range of conditions from hollows to intermediate-height positions. This microform flexibility sets it apart from more niche-restricted Sphagnum species. The moss's vigorous lateral spread capability is particularly evident under favourable conditions, where it can significantly expand its coverage area through vegetative growth.

== Similar species ==
Sphagnum angustifolium shows considerable morphological variation, particularly in southern parts of its range where identification becomes more challenging due to less distinct characteristics. Although the species maintains consistent microscopic features, its overall appearance can vary considerably, making field identification difficult.

=== Key identifying features ===
The most reliable features for identifying S. angustifolium are:

- rounded stem leaves (distinguishing it from S. fallax which has pointed stem leaves with a sharp mucro)
- no more than four branches per fascicle (compared to up to five in S. recurvum and S. flexuosum)
- distinctive large pores on hanging branch leaves near the leaf tips (visible under microscope)

While some botanists cite translucent pink (sometimes described as red) coloration in the internal branch tissue as a distinguishing feature, this characteristic can also appear in S. recurvum and, less commonly, in S. flexuosum and S. cuspidatum, making it an unreliable diagnostic feature.

Comparison of capitula with similar species
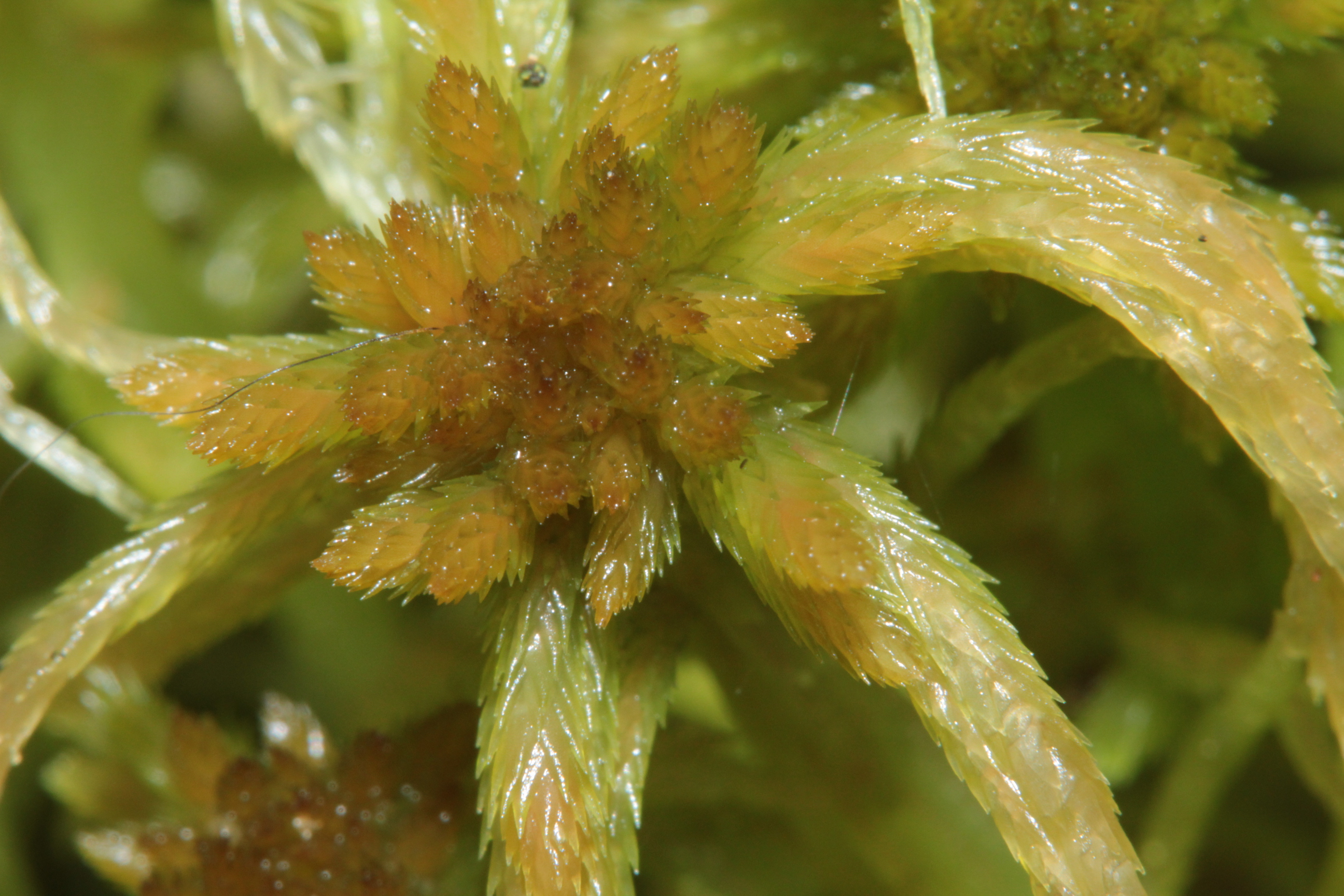
S. angustifolium

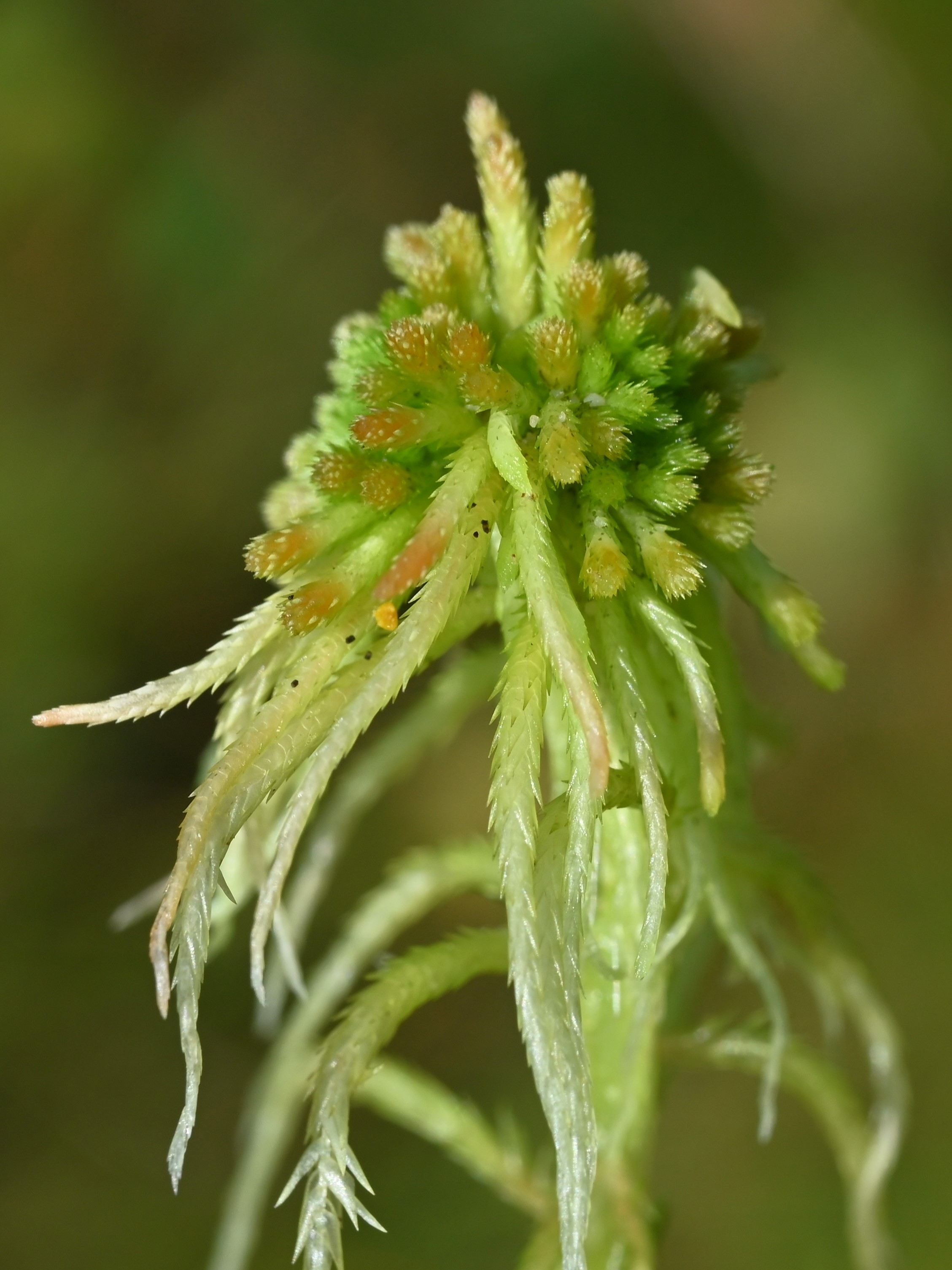
S. fallax

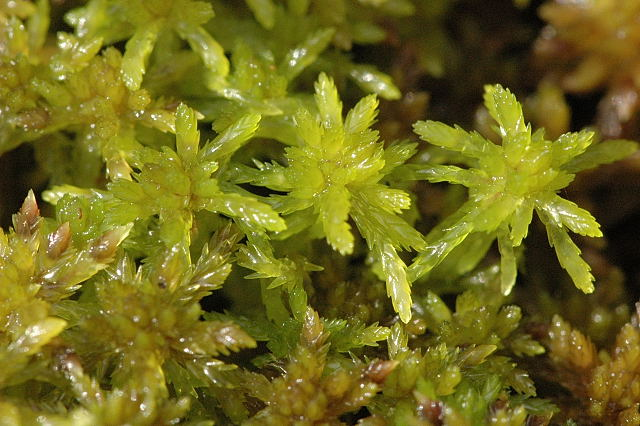
S. flexuosum

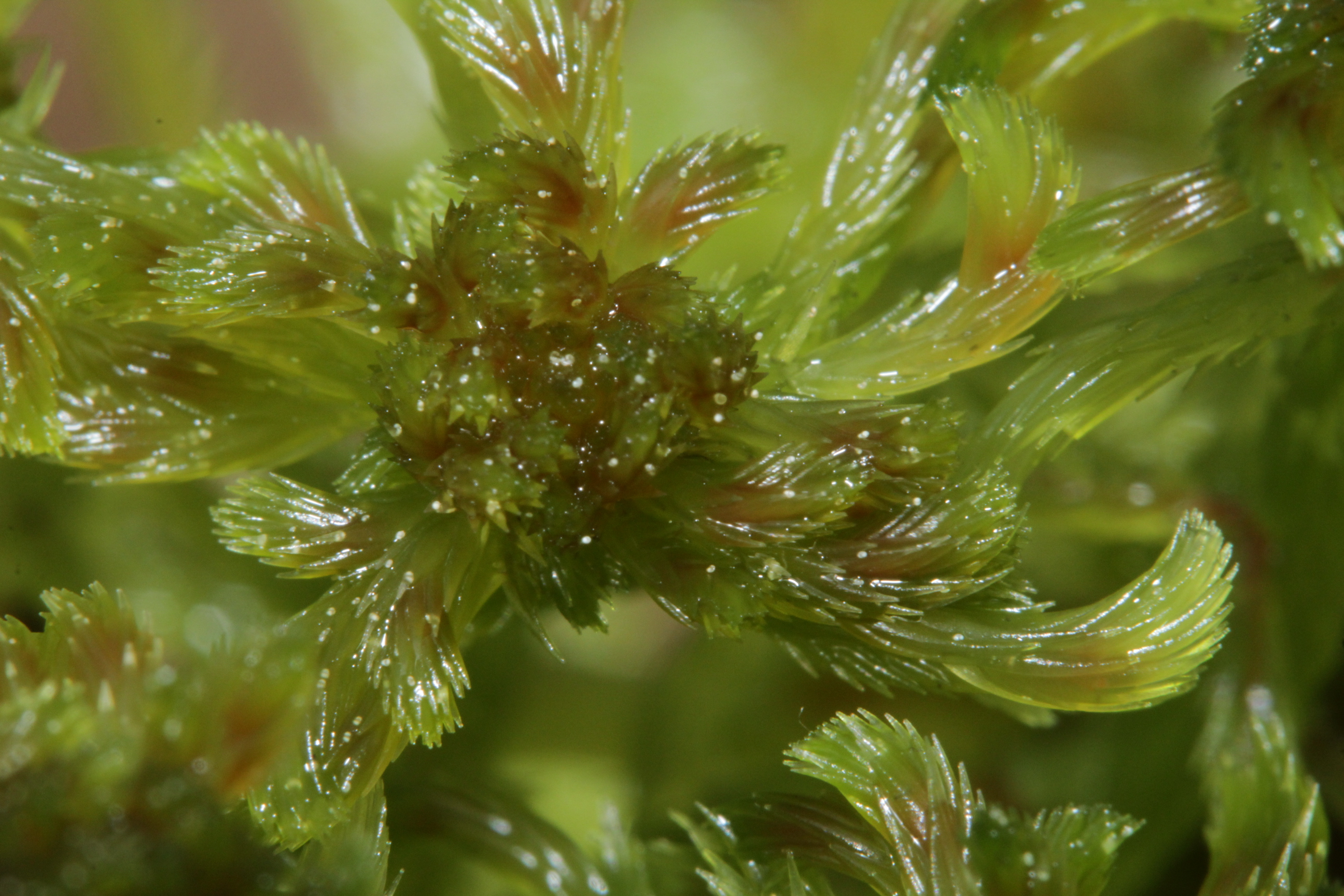
S. cuspidatum

=== Confusion with similar species ===
The most significant taxonomic confusion occurs within the S. recurvum complex, particularly between S. angustifolium and S. flexuosum, which show some genetic overlap despite being distinct species. Genetic studies have revealed that about 8–13% of specimens display intermediate or ambiguous morphological features, though this morphological ambiguity does not correspond to genetic intermediacy between species.

The species may superficially resemble both S. recurvum and S. flexuosum, but can usually be distinguished by its smaller size and proportionally narrower branch leaves. The four-branch fascicle characteristic remains consistent even when other morphological features are ambiguous.

In exposed, wet areas, particularly in the upland regions of northern and western Britain, S. angustifolium might be confused with ground-growing forms of S. cuspidatum. However, S. angustifolium can be distinguished by two key features: it has small-leaved hanging branches and lacks the linear leaves at the tips of its spreading branches that are characteristic of S. cuspidatum.

== Habitat and distribution ==
Globally, S. angustifolium has a circumboreal distribution (occurring throughout the northern regions of Europe, Asia, and North America) with a distinct preference for continental rather than coastal areas. It is particularly significant as the only member of the S. recurvum species complex (which includes S. recurvum itself and S. flexuosum) found in the continental interior of North America. In Europe, the species is widely distributed from lowland to subalpine regions, though it becomes less common near coastal areas. Studies have documented its presence across numerous European countries, including Bulgaria, Croatia, Czech Republic, Denmark, Estonia, Finland, France, Germany, Greece, Hungary, Latvia, Lithuania, Montenegro, Norway, Poland, Romania, Serbia, Slovakia, Slovenia, Spain, Sweden, and the United Kingdom. The species shows substantive morphological variation across this range, with populations in southern Europe often displaying less distinct morphological characteristics than their northern counterparts, making identification more challenging in these regions. Within Britain, it is considered relatively uncommon and sparsely distributed, though researchers note that its full distribution pattern has not yet been completely documented. In the British Isles, S. angustifolium is most frequently encountered in locations where there is a distinct flow of mineral-enriched water, favouring the more nutrient-rich end of its ecological tolerance range.

In permafrost regions, S. angustifolium shows distinct patterns of occurrence related to permafrost conditions. It is particularly associated with boreal regions and discontinuous permafrost zones, being absent from the continuous permafrost zone of the Low Subarctic. This distribution pattern suggests the species may be less well-adapted to the more extreme conditions of high-latitude permafrost environments.

The species commonly occurs in collapse scars—areas where permafrost has thawed, causing ground subsidence. In these environments, it typically occupies positions with intermediate water table depths, forming extensive lawn communities. These communities represent a transitional stage between very wet, recently thawed areas and drier, more mature peatland vegetation. The species shows particular success in boreal collapse scars where it often becomes a dominant species during intermediate stages of ecosystem recovery.

Unlike some Sphagnum species that are restricted to specific microhabitat conditions, S. angustifolium shows considerable flexibility in its habitat requirements within collapse scar environments. This adaptability allows it to persist across a range of moisture conditions, though it tends to be most abundant in areas with moderate water tables that have had time to stabilise after initial permafrost thaw.

== Reproduction ==
=== Reproductive structures and timing ===
Sphagnum angustifolium is dioicous, meaning male and female reproductive structures occur on separate plants. In its native range, such as the Changbai Mountains of China, reproductive maturity typically occurs in late July to early August. Female plants first show swollen archegonia (reproductive organs), which then develop into light yellow-brown spore capsules. The male structures are often conspicuous, surrounded by brightly coloured yellow or pale orange modified leaves that contrast sharply with the plant's normal green foliage. Spore capsules are frequently found in some areas, producing yellow, slightly rough-surfaced spores measuring 22–24 micrometres in diameter. The male structures are often conspicuous, surrounded by brightly coloured yellow or pale orange modified leaves that contrast sharply with the plant's normal green foliage.

Female plants develop swollen archegonia (reproductive organs), which then mature into light yellow-brown spore capsules supported by a stalk (seta). The capsules produce yellow, slightly rough-surfaced spores measuring 22–24 micrometres (μm) in diameter. The species produces relatively small spores (approximately 25 μm in diameter) with sparse surface protrusions on their outer layer (perispore).

=== Spore germination and establishment ===
When spores successfully germinate, they first develop into a filamentous structure called a protonema before growing into mature moss plants. The species shows distinct patterns in spore germination that reflect its habitat preferences. When exposed to alternating dry and wet conditions, which commonly occur in peatland environments, the species' spores show reduced germination success and viability compared to consistently wet conditions. Although S. angustifolium can grow in both hollow and hummock microhabitats, its spores show characteristics more typical of hollow-dwelling species. In experimental conditions, spores maintain higher germination percentages under consistently wet conditions compared to dry conditions, reflecting adaptation to the wetter microhabitats where the species is commonly found. This pattern of spore germination may help explain the species' distribution patterns and habitat preferences in peatland ecosystems.

=== Chemical defenses and reproductive success ===
Sphagnum angustifolium invests heavily in safeguarding its reproductive structures. Reproductive shoots contain higher concentrations of defensive compounds, particularly phenolics, compared to non-reproductive shoots. These chemical defenses protect developing spores from herbivores and other threats.

Environmental conditions experienced by parent plants influence reproductive success through a maternal effect. For instance, spores from plants exposed to herbivores show germination rates up to 46% lower than those from undisturbed plants. Despite this, herbivory does not significantly affect the number, size, or weight of spore capsules.

=== Environmental influences ===
The germination and reproductive development of Sphagnum angustifolium are highly dependent on environmental conditions. Germination studies indicate that its spores are particularly sensitive to moisture, with stable and consistently wet conditions proving essential for successful germination and establishment.

The species shows flexibility in its reproductive timing and success under varying environmental conditions. However, reproduction is most effective in habitats resembling its preferred mesotrophic mires. This adaptability supports its capacity to sustain populations across a wide geographic range.

== Ecology ==
Sphagnum angustifolium is an important ecosystem engineer in peatlands, meaning it significantly modifies its environment and influences how the ecosystem functions. The species plays a particularly important role in northern ecosystems such as peatlands. The species is particularly well-adapted to open areas in peatlands, where it can maintain stable growth even under variable environmental conditions.

=== Habitat and microhabitat preferences ===
Sphagnum angustifolium adapts well to various growing conditions but is most common in wet, moderately nutrient-rich (mesotrophic) mires. It either forms pure carpets or grows alongside other peat moss species, such as Sphagnum riparium, S. flexuosum, S. fusbum, S. subnitens, S. recurvum var. mucronatum, S. russowii, and S. magellanicum. Sphagnum angustifolium generally occupies a middle ground between raised hummocks (mounds) and waterlogged hollows in bogs. It also grows in partially submerged areas with S. riparium or S. jensenii and in drier elevated regions with S. magellanicum. Its tolerance for moderate shade enables dominance in some wooded mires and frequent presence in sedge-dominated wetlands.

Sphagnum angustifolium responds distinctly to varying light conditions. It achieves peak photosynthetic performance under moderate shade (30% light reduction), with rates up to 42% higher than in deep shade (90% reduction). In deep shade, it shows thin, spindly growth (etiolation). Growth patterns differ across microhabitats: in hollows, growth decreases steadily with increased shading, while on hummocks, it shows a more complex relationship. Its lack of growth in full sunlight on hummocks suggests high light may inhibit growth. The species is most photosynthetically active during cloudy or rainy periods, reflecting its adaptation to moist, partially shaded environments.

Sphagnum angustifolium has genomic and physiological adaptations for bog environments. Its 395 Mb genome includes specialised pathways to manage pH stress through hormone expression and cell transport mechanisms, supporting stable growth across diverse bog pH conditions.

=== Ecological interactions ===
Sphagnum angustifolium supports various invertebrates (animals without backbones) in peatland ecosystems, including ants, ground beetles (Carabidae), and non-biting midges (Chironomidae). Some of these organisms may use the moss as a food source.

The species has developed effective chemical defenses against plant-eating animals. It produces defensive compounds called polyphenols, which serve multiple functions: they can deter animals from eating the plant, protect against bacterial infection, and influence how quickly plant material decomposes.

When growing in favourable conditions with consistent moisture and adequate nutrients, S. angustifolium shows remarkable resilience to damage from herbivores. It can increase its growth rate to compensate for such damage. The species can maintain this growth while simultaneously producing defensive chemicals, helping ensure its survival in peatland ecosystems. This resilience is further demonstrated by the species' ability to maintain higher chlorophyll concentrations compared to related species under stressed conditions, suggesting robust physiological adaptations to environmental challenges.

=== Ecosystem functions ===
Sphagnum angustifolium plays a critical role in peatland ecosystem processes. Its decay-resistant plant material, enriched with polyphenols, supports carbon storage by slowing decomposition. This characteristic enhances the species' contribution to carbon cycling and storage in peatlands. Additionally, its growth and decomposition influence nutrient availability and movement within these ecosystems The species shows adaptability in carbon exchange, actively releasing or absorbing carbon dioxide depending on environmental conditions. This flexibility positions it as a key regulator of carbon cycling in peatlands. Even under environmental stress, such as warming or reduced precipitation, S. angustifolium maintains its biomass production and decay-resistant properties, ensuring the continuity of its ecosystem functions.

=== Succession and disturbance response ===
Sphagnum angustifolium contributes to peatland succession, particularly in regions recovering from permafrost thaw. In boreal peatlands, it forms intermediate "lawn communities" following the floating mat stage dominated by species such as S. riparium. These communities mark a transition from wet post-thaw conditions to drier hummock communities featuring S. fuscum or Mylia anomala. S. angustifolium communities show rapid ecological turnover; for example, studies in northwestern Canada report a 30% change in composition over a decade, highlighting its transitional role in succession.

Sphagnum angustifolium responds distinctly to post-fire conditions, influencing its recovery and establishment. It establishes more successfully in severely burnt areas than in lightly burnt ones, likely due to differences in peat hydrophobicity. When transplanted, S. angustifolium shows vigorous lateral growth in severely burnt areas, achieving some of the highest rates of surface area expansion among Sphagnum species. Its success depends on transplant size, with larger plugs (10–15 cm in diameter) showing better survival and growth, likely due to improved moisture retention. Under optimal conditions, S. angustifolium can expand its surface area by over 900% in severely burnt areas within two growing seasons. However, its establishment is strongly affected by local moisture conditions.

=== Environmental responses ===
Sphagnum angustifolium demonstrates resilience to climate change, maintaining stable morphology and growth under experimental warming and reduced precipitation. Studies in Polish peatlands show that the species retained its typical plant length, capitulum size, and biomass production under these conditions, unlike S. fallax, which experiences substantial reductions in size and growth.

Moisture conditions play a central role in its ecology. Sphagnum angustifolium shows a strong spectral response to desiccation, particularly in shortwave infrared wavelengths, while maintaining stable spectral properties for up to 48 hours after rewetting. As an oligo-ombrotrophic species, it loses about 10% of its moisture content over a week of drying, compared to 40% in mesotrophic species, supporting its colonisation of diverse bog microhabitats.

The species adapts effectively to drier conditions. Even with a 37% reduction in nighttime precipitation, it maintains growth patterns and chlorophyll concentrations, reflecting efficient water retention and sustained photosynthesis. Higher chlorophyll concentrations under these conditions indicate strong physiological resilience.

Responses to climate stress vary by life stage and environmental context. Mature stands are more vulnerable to drought, showing bleaching and reduced growth during extended periods of low water tables. In contrast, younger plants display greater resilience, particularly when supported by companion plants or artificial shading.

Experimental studies reveal specific physiological adaptations to warming and elevated CO_{2}. S. angustifolium exhibits reduced carbon concentration and increased nitrogen in its leaves but maintains stable lipid chemistry. Unlike vascular plants, it allocates resources to osmotic compounds that enhance water retention, albeit at the cost of reduced carbon allocation to other processes. Under elevated CO_{2}, the species shows reduced atmospheric carbon uptake and relies more on CO_{2} released by degrading peat. This indicates complex interactions between S. angustifolium and peatland carbon cycling under climate change.

The species adapts to water level drawdown with relatively stable biomass production, even under lower water tables. It often produces more biomass during warmer seasons, provided minimum water requirements are met. This flexibility supports its growth across various peatland microhabitats, from wetter hollows to drier hummocks. Nutrient status influences its response to hydrological changes. In nutrient-poor peatlands, it maintains stable production after water level changes, sometimes increasing biomass during warmer growing seasons. This suggests S. angustifolium may expand its range in boreal peatlands as warming and water table changes occur. With its adaptability to warming and drying, S. angustifolium could become more dominant in northern peatlands, potentially replacing more sensitive species.
