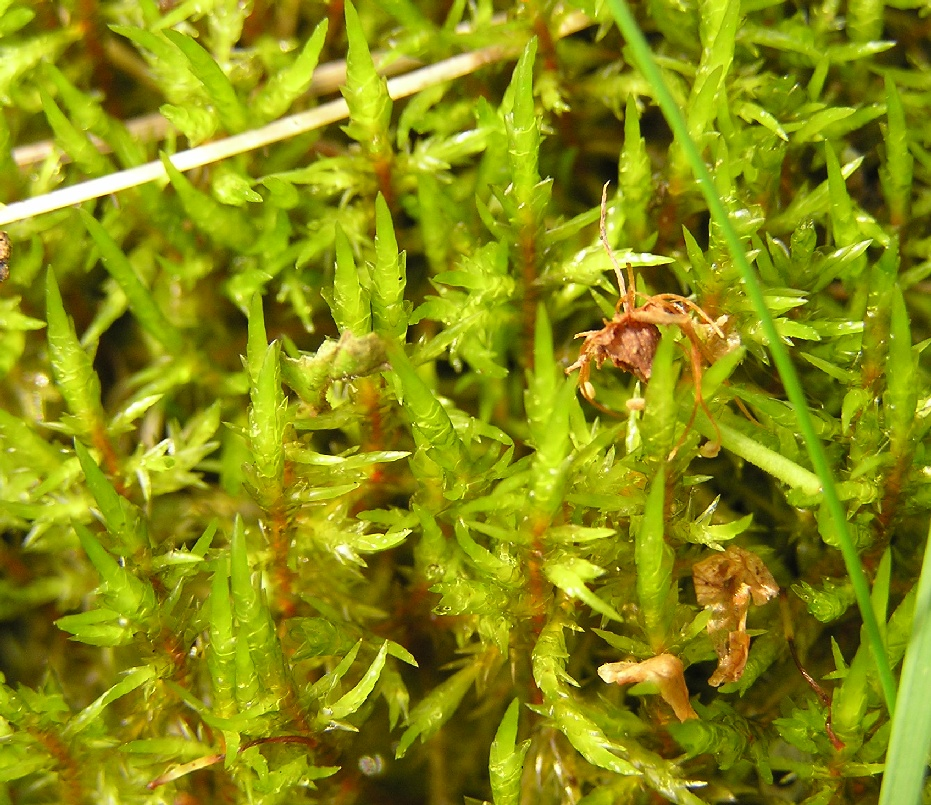
- Calliergonella cuspidata

Scientific classification
- Kingdom: Plantae
- Division: Bryophyta
- Class: Bryopsida
- Subclass: Bryidae
- Order: Hypnales
- Family: Pylaisiaceae
- Genus: Calliergonella; Loeske

= Calliergonella =

Genus of mosses

Calliergonella is a genus of mosses belonging to the family Pylaisiaceae.

The genus was first described by Loeske.

The genus has cosmopolitan distribution.

Species:

- Calliergonella cuspidata
- Calliergonella lindbergii
