= Lewis Edward Anderson =

American bryologist (1912–2007)

Lewis E. Anderson
- Born: June 16, 1912; Batesville, Mississippi, U.S.
- Died: February 1, 2007 (aged 94)
- Education: Mississippi State University; Duke University; University of Pennsylvania
- Known for: Bryology
- Scientific career
- Fields: Botany
- Doctoral students: Harold E. Robinson
- Author abbrev. (botany): L.E.Anderson

Lewis Edward Anderson (June 16, 1912 – February 1, 2007) was an American botanist dedicated to the study of mosses, and was an expert on the North American bryoflora.

== Early life ==
Anderson was born to a farming family in a rural area of Batesville, Mississippi. He began his education in a small school that convened first grade only every other year, so he started at age 5 and was more or less moved along as teachers recognized comprehension, so he left high school at 15 and graduated from Mississippi State University with a Bachelor of Science at 19. He undertook postgraduate studies in botany at Duke University and received a master's degree in 1933. It was here where Anderson became interested in mosses while studying under Hugo Leander Blomquist. At age 22, he earned his Ph.D. from the University of Pennsylvania.

== Career ==
In 1936, Anderson was added to the botany faculty at Duke University to specialize cytology, and he was given the responsibility of curating the moss herbarium. Anderson's research then began to shift from cellular cytology to the ecology and classification of mosses. He, with the help of his colleague Ruth Margery Addoms, built the institution's first general botany course.

Throughout his career, Anderson was assisted by his wife, Pat, whom he met while she was a nursing student at Duke. They married in 1941 and after having 5 children between 1942 and 1947, she accompanied him on field trips, marking topography maps with collection sites and managing specimen packets. She also helped prepare and distribute "The Bryologist", journal of The American Bryological Society.

During World War II, Anderson took leave from Duke to serve in the Navy and was intelligence officer from February through September, 1945 on the USS Hancock, an aircraft carrier in the Pacific. He was awarded a Bronze Star and was discharged as a lieutenant commander.

Anderson frequently collaborated with Howard A. Crum, and in 1981, the two published a two-volume flora on the mosses of eastern North America. With Crum he edited the exsiccata Mosses of North America. Anderson continued to expand the bryophyte herbarium at Duke, and he helped to develop a graduate program in bryology. He retired from Duke in 1982.

== Legacy ==
The moss genus Bryoandersonia was named after him by Harold E. Robinson. Some species, including Bryocrumia andersonii, also bear his name.

In 1998, the bryophyte herbarium at Duke University was officially named the L.E. Anderson Bryophyte Herbarium. It holds approximately 260,000 specimens.

== Selected publications ==
- Crum, Howard A.; Anderson, Lewis Edward (1981). Mosses of Eastern North America. Columbia University Press. ISBN 9780231045162.
- Anderson, Lewis Edward; Shaw, Arthur Jonathon; Shaw, Blanka (2009). Peat Mosses of the Southeastern United States. New York Botanical Garden. ISBN 9780893275051.
