= Elizabeth C. Addoms =

American physical therapist (1905–1983)

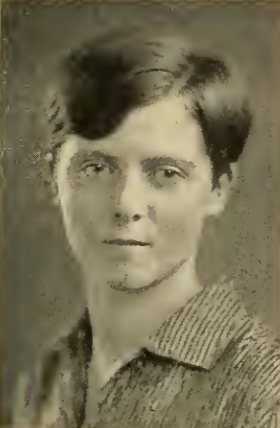
- Elizabeth C. Addoms, from the 1927 yearbook of Wellesley College
- Born: Elizabeth Copeland Addoms; February 28, 1905; Brooklyn, New York, U.S.
- Died: August 26, 1983 (aged 78)
- Occupations: Physical therapist, college professor
- Relatives: Ruth M. Addoms (sister)

Elizabeth Copeland Addoms (February 28, 1905 – August 26, 1983) was an American physical therapist who worked mainly on rehabilitation for children with cerebral palsy. She was director of the physical therapy program at New York University (NYU) from 1946 to 1970.

== Early life and education ==
Addoms was from Brooklyn, New York, the daughter of William Henry Addoms and Lucy M. Copeland Addoms. Her father was a businessman. Her older sister was botanist Ruth M. Addoms. She graduated from Wellesley College in 1927.

== Career ==
Addoms taught high school as a young woman. She worked as a therapist at the Neurological Institute of New York, and taught at New York University (NYU). In 1946 she was named director of the physical therapy program at NYU, and served in that leadership role until 1970. She held a long-term fellowship from the National Foundation for Infantile Paralysis.

Addoms served on the board of directors of the American Physical Therapy Association (APTA), and was president of the Physical Therapy Fund from 1961 to 1962. APTA gave Addoms the Lucy Blair Service Award in 1971.

== Publications ==
- "Treatment of Birth-Injured Children" (1934)
- "A Program for Birth-Injured Children" (1936)
- "The Day School as a Vital Factor in Rehabilitation of the Birth Injured" (1941)
- "Objectives of basic physical therapy education" (1961, with Mary E. Callahan and Beatrice F. Schulz)
- "Functions of the physical therapist" (1961, with Mary E. Callahan and Beatrice F. Schulz)
- A Manual of Electrotesting and Electrotherapy for Physical Therapy Students (1964, with Edna Wolf and Samuel S. Sverdlik )

== Personal life and legacy ==
Addoms died in 1983, at the age of 78. Her grave is in Brooklyn's Green-Wood Cemetery. Since 1975, NYU's physical therapy program has given the Elizabeth C. Addoms Award for Excellence in her honor.
