= Bryocrumia =

Scientific classification
- Kingdom: Plantae
- Division: Bryophyta
- Class: Bryopsida
- Subclass: Bryidae
- Order: Hypnales
- Family: Hypnaceae
- Genus: Bryocrumia; L.E.Anderson
- Species: B. vivicolor

Binomial name
- Bryocrumia vivicolor (Brotherus & Dixon) W.R.Buck

Synonyms
- Taxithelium vivicolor Brotherus & Dixon; Bryocrumia andersonii (E.B.Bartram) L.E.Anderson; Glossadelphus andersonii E.B.Bartram; Glossadelphus vivicolor (Brotherus & Dixon) Brotherus; Taxiphyllum andersonii (E. B. Bartram) H. A. Crum

Genus of mosses

Bryocrumia vivicolor is a rheophytic species of moss belonging to the family Hypnaceae, and is the sole representative of the genus Bryocrumia.

The genus has been found in moist, shady sites at moderate elevation in the United States, China, India, Sri Lanka, Kenya, Uganda, and Zaire. Sporophytes were first observed in 2016 on collections in Yunnan.

The genus was described by Lewis Edward Anderson in 1980. It was named for bryologist Howard Alvin Crum.
