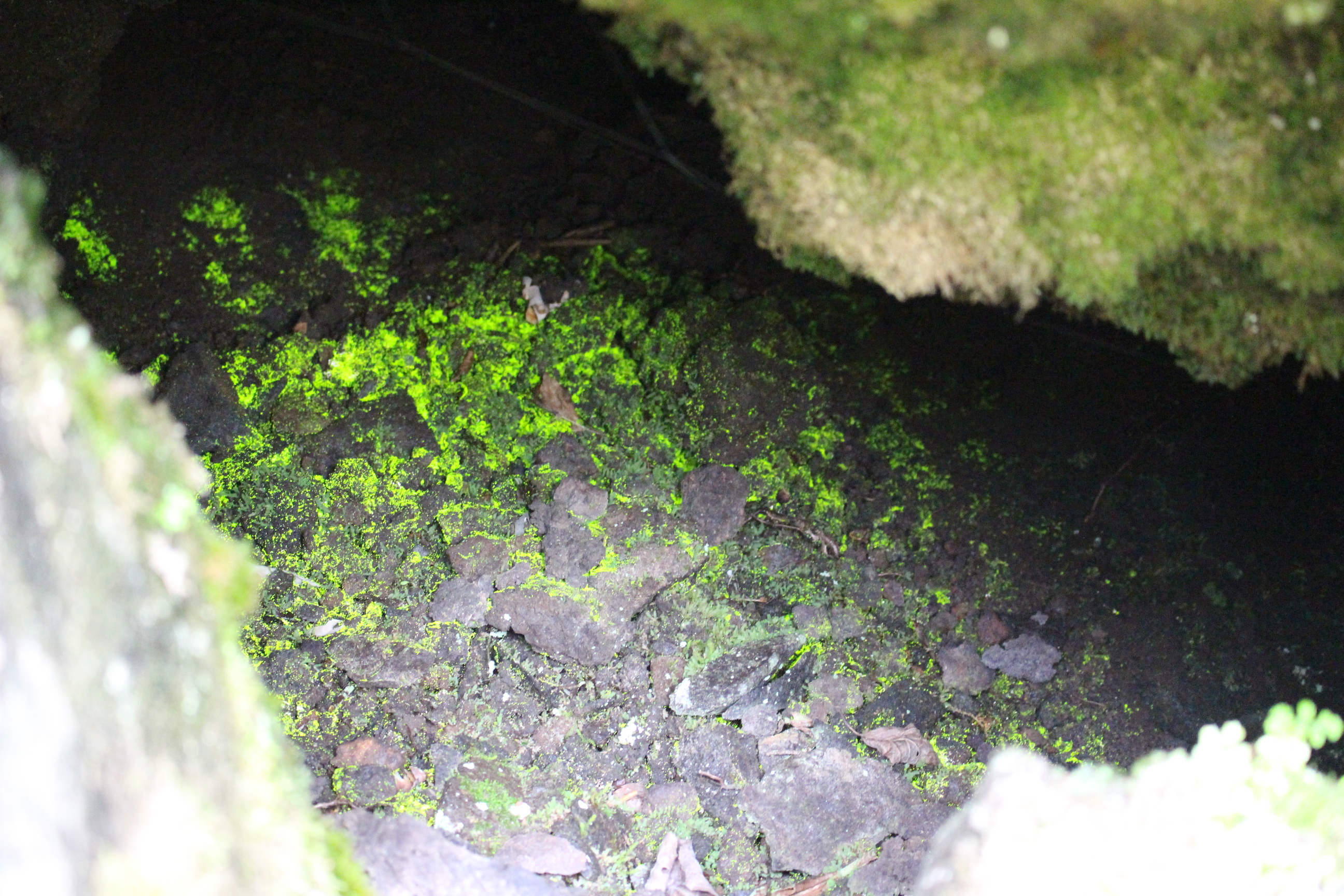
- Luminous moss photographed in Japan

Scientific classification
- Kingdom: Plantae
- Division: Bryophyta
- Class: Bryopsida
- Subclass: Dicranidae
- Order: Dicranales
- Family: Schistostegaceae; Schimp.
- Genus: Schistostega; D. Mohr
- Species: S. pennata

Binomial name
- Schistostega pennata (Hedw.) F.Weber & D.Mohr

= Schistostega =

Monotypic genus of haplolepideous mosses

Schistostega pennata, also called goblin gold, Dragon's gold, luminous moss or luminescent moss, is a haplolepidous moss (Dicranidae) known for its glowing appearance in dark places. It is the only member of the family Schistostegaceae.

== Description ==
The moss has adapted to grow in low light conditions by utilizing spherical cells in the protonema that act as lenses, collecting and concentrating even the faintest light. The chloroplasts absorb the useful wavelengths of the light and reflect back the remainder towards the light source, giving the moss a greenish-gold glow. The little lenses have the capability of turning towards the light source to maximise the collection of available light.

The fronds of shoots that develop from the persistent protonema are small (1.5 cm long) with opposing pairs of leaves. A long stalk holds the egg-shaped capsule aloft.

== Distribution ==
Schistostega pennata is found in China, Japan, Siberia, Europe, and North America.

It is easily outcompeted by other mosses and plant species in open, brighter areas, but its ability to concentrate the available light allows it to grow in shady places where other plants cannot survive. It prefers damp, but not too wet, mineral soils with a source of dim light, such as reflection from a pool of water, and so grows in habitats such as overturned tree roots, entrances to animal burrows and caves.

== Folklore ==
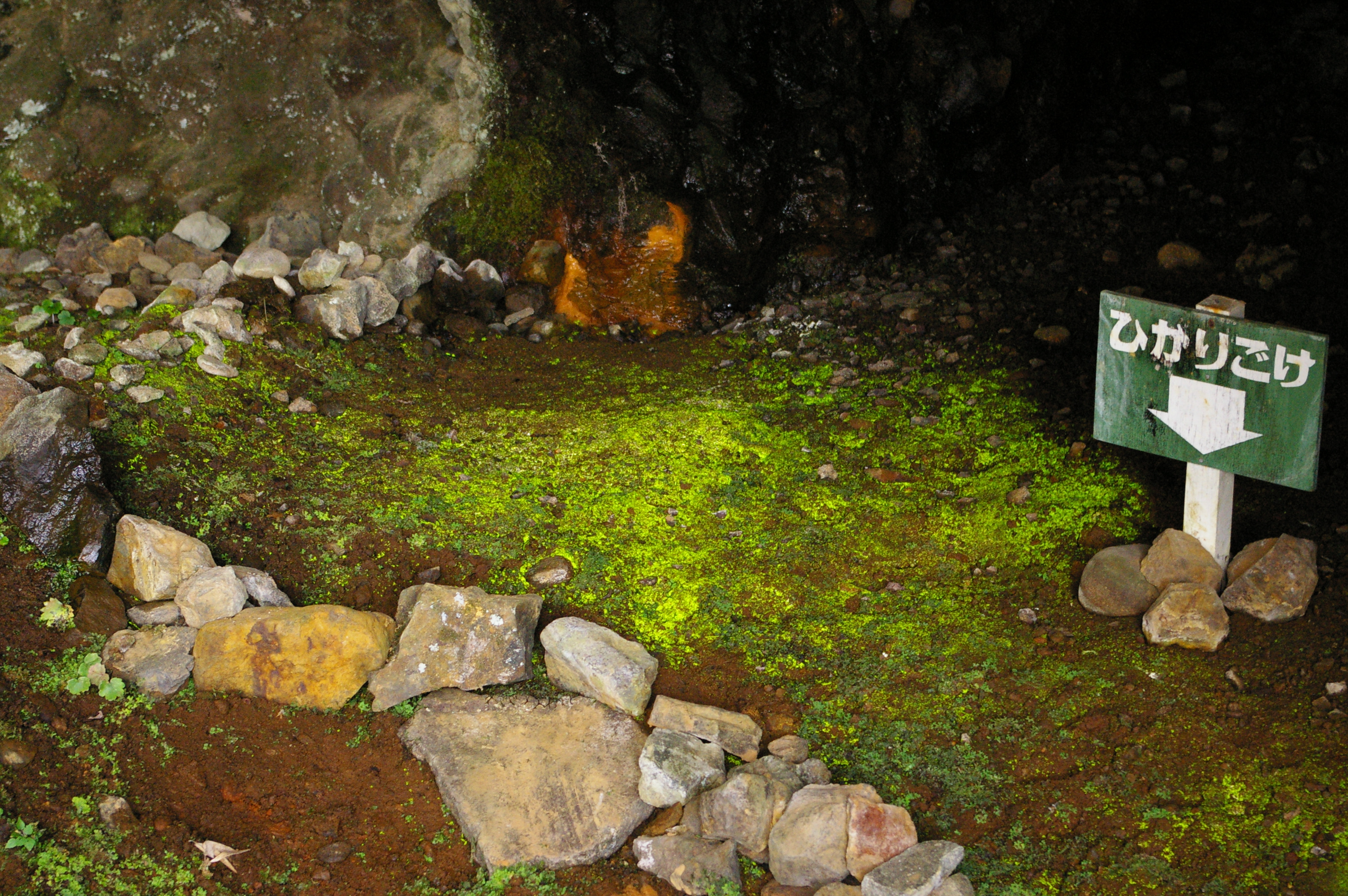
Makkausu Cave, Rausu, Hokkaido

Concerning the moss's common names, such as "goblin gold", Austrian botanist Anton Kerner von Marilaun wrote in Das Pflanzenleben der Donauländer in 1863:

On looking into the interior of the cave, the background appears quite dark, and an ill-defined twilight only appears to fall from the center on to the side walls; but on the level floor of the cave innumerable golden-green points of light sparkle and gleam, so that it might be imagined that small emeralds had been scattered over the ground. If we reach curiously into the depth of the grotto to snatch a specimen of the shining objects, and examine the prize in our hand under a bright light, we can scarcely believe our eyes, for there is nothing else but dull lusterless earth and damp, mouldering bits of stone of yellowish-grey color! Only on looking closer will it be noticed that the soil and stones are studded and spun over with dull green dots and delicate threads, and that, moreover, there appears a delicate filigree of tiny moss-plants, resembling a small arched feather stuck in the ground. This phenomenon, that an object should only shine in dark rocky clefts, and immediately lose its brilliance when it is brought into the bright daylight, is so surprising that one can easily understand how the legends have arisen of fantastic gnomes and cave-inhabiting goblins who allow the covetous sons of earth to gaze on the gold and precious stones, but prepare a bitter disappointment for the seeker of the enchanted treasure; that, when he empties out the treasure which he hastily raked together in the cave, he sees roll out of the sacks, not glittering jewels, but only common earth.

There is a monument to Schistostega in Hokkaido, Japan, where it grows in profusion in a tiny cave.
