= William Jesse Goad Land =

American botanist

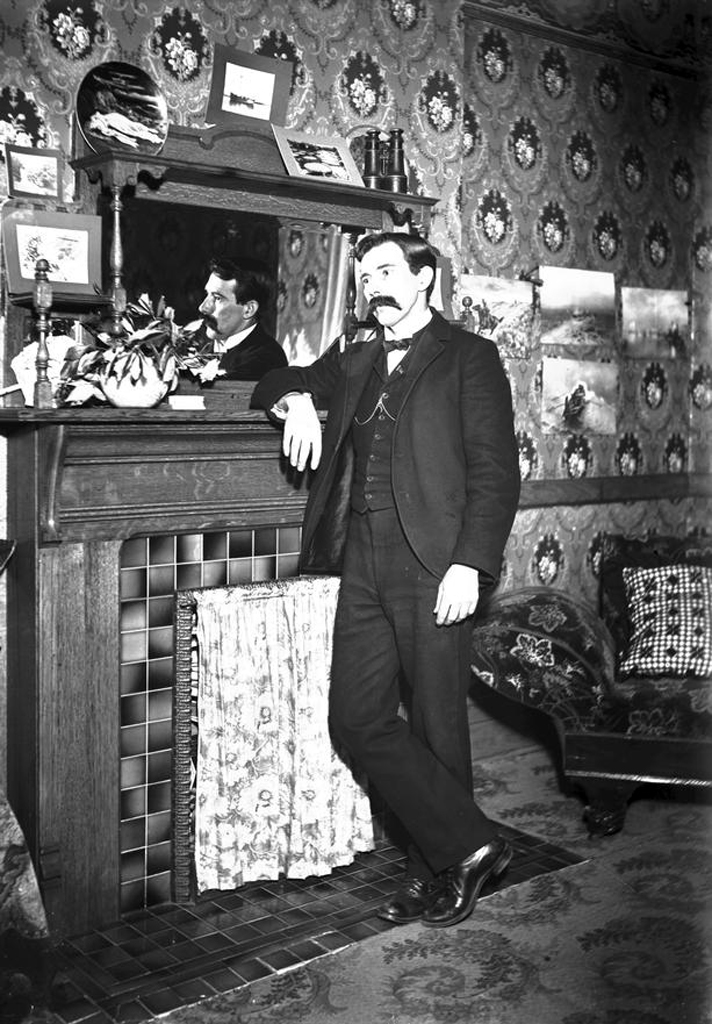
- W. J. G. Land between 1891 and 1915
- Born: December 7, 1865; Alton, Illinois
- Died: August 1, 1942 (aged 76); Brownsville, Texas
- Education: University of Chicago
- Scientific career
- Fields: Botany
- Workplaces: University of Chicago
- Doctoral students: Hugo Leander Blomquist

William Jesse Goad Land (December 7, 1865 – August 1, 1942) was an American botanist, inventor, and professor at the University of Chicago.

== Biography ==
Land started taking botany classes at the University of Chicago in 1898. He earned his B.S. from the school in 1902, and his Ph.D. in 1904. He started working at the university as an assistant in morphology in 1904 and was promoted to an instructor in botany in 1908. He became assistant professor in 1911, associate professor in 1915, and a full professor in 1928. His teaching focused more heavily on laboratory studies instead of traditional lectures. He retired in 1931, but remained as an emeritus.

Land was a Fellow of the American Association for the Advancement of Science, and a member of many other academic societies. Personally, he was a life member of the National Rifle Association and organized the University of Chicago Rifle Club.

Land was also an accomplished inventor. He created formalin-aceto-alcohol and formalic-acetic-waterfixing agents for his laboratory studies. He also invented a telescopic sight mount for sniper rifles used by the U.S. Army and U.S. Navy.

== Works ==
- "A Morphological Study of Thuja" (Ph.D. thesis), Botanical Gazette Vol. 36 (1902).
- "Spermatogenesis and Oögenesis in Ephedra trifurca", Botanical Gazette Vol. 38 (1904).
- "Gametophytes and Embryo of Torreya" (with John Merle Coulter), Botanical Gazette Vol. 39 (1905).
- "The origin of air chambers" (with Charles Reid Barnes), Botanical Gazette Vol. 44 (1907).
- "Fertilization and Embryogeny in Ephedra trifurca," Botanical Gazette Vol. 44 (1907).
- "The origin of the cupule of Marchantia" (with Charles Reid Barnes), Botanical Gazette Vol. 46 (1908).
- "An American Lepidostrobus" (with John Merle Coulter), Botanical Gazette Vol. 51 (1911).
- "An Electrical Constant Temperature Apparatus," Botanical Gazette Vol. 52 (1911).
- "A Protocorm of Ophioglossum," Botanical Gazette Vol. 52 (1911).
