= Edmund Russow =

Baltic German biologist

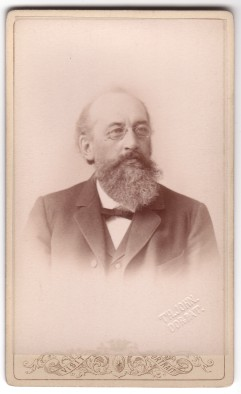
- Born: 24 February [O.S. 12] 1841; Reval, Governorate of Estonia, Russian Empire
- Died: 11 April [O.S. 30 March] 1897 (aged 56); Yuryev, Governorate of Livonia, Russian Empire
- Education: Imperial University of Dorpat; Friedrich-Wilhelm University of Berlin
- Scientific career
- Workplaces: Imperial University of Dorpat

Edmund August Friedrich Russow (Russian: Эдмунд Фридрихович Руссов, romanized: Edmund Fridrikhovich Russov; 24 February [O.S. 12] 1841 – 11 April [O.S. 30 March] 1897) was a biologist of Baltic German descent.

== Academic career ==
The son of a military engineer, Edmund Russow studied at the Universities of Dorpat (now Tartu, Tartu County, Estonia) and Berlin. In 1867, he became an associate professor at Dorpat, where from 1874 to 1897, he served as a full professor. In 1895–1897, he was president of the Estonian Naturalists' Society. Russow was at the forefront of nature conservation in Estonia, and associated with the work of Hugo Conwentz (1865–1922), a founder of nature conservation efforts throughout Europe.

== Botanical work ==
Russow was an authority on Sphagnaceae (sphagnum mosses) and remembered for his research in plant anatomy and histology, in particular studies of the plant family Marsileaceae (aquatic and semi-aquatic ferns). The plant genus Russowia is named in his honor, as is Sphagnum russowii (Russow's sphagnum).

== Written works ==
- Histologie und Entwicklungsgeschichte der Sporenfrucht von Marsilia. Dissertation. Dorpat (1871)
- Entwickelungsgeschichte der Sporenfrucht von Marsilia (1873). In: Mémoires de l'Académie Impériale des Sciences de Saint-Pétersbourg, série VII, tome XIX, p. 42
- Vergleichende Untersuchungen betreffend die Histiologie … der leitbundel Kryptogamen. In: Mémoires de l'Académie Impériale des Sciences de St.-Pétersbourg, 1872
- Betrachtungen über das leitbundel- und grundgewebe aus vergleichend morphologischem und phylogenetischem geschichtspunkt (1875).

== Sources ==
- "Руссов, Эдмунд" . Brockhaus and Efron Encyclopedic Dictionary (in Russian). 1906.
