= Crumia =

Scientific classification
- Kingdom: Plantae
- Division: Bryophyta
- Class: Bryopsida
- Subclass: Dicranidae
- Order: Pottiales
- Family: Pottiaceae
- Genus: Crumia; W.B.Schofield
- Species: C. latifolia

Binomial name
- Crumia latifolia W.B.Schofield

Synonyms
- Merceya latifolia Kindb.; Scopelophila latifolia (Kindb.) Renauld & Cardot

Genus of mosses

Crumia latifolia is a species of moss belonging to the family Pottiaceae, and is the sole representative of the genus Crumia.

The species is found in low to mid elevation sites throughout the western United States and Canada. Exposed individuals may turn a reddish-brown color. It was described by Wilfred Borden Schofield in 1966.

Tortula deciduidentata was once placed in this genus as Crumia deciduidentata. The genus is named for bryologist Howard Alvin Crum.
