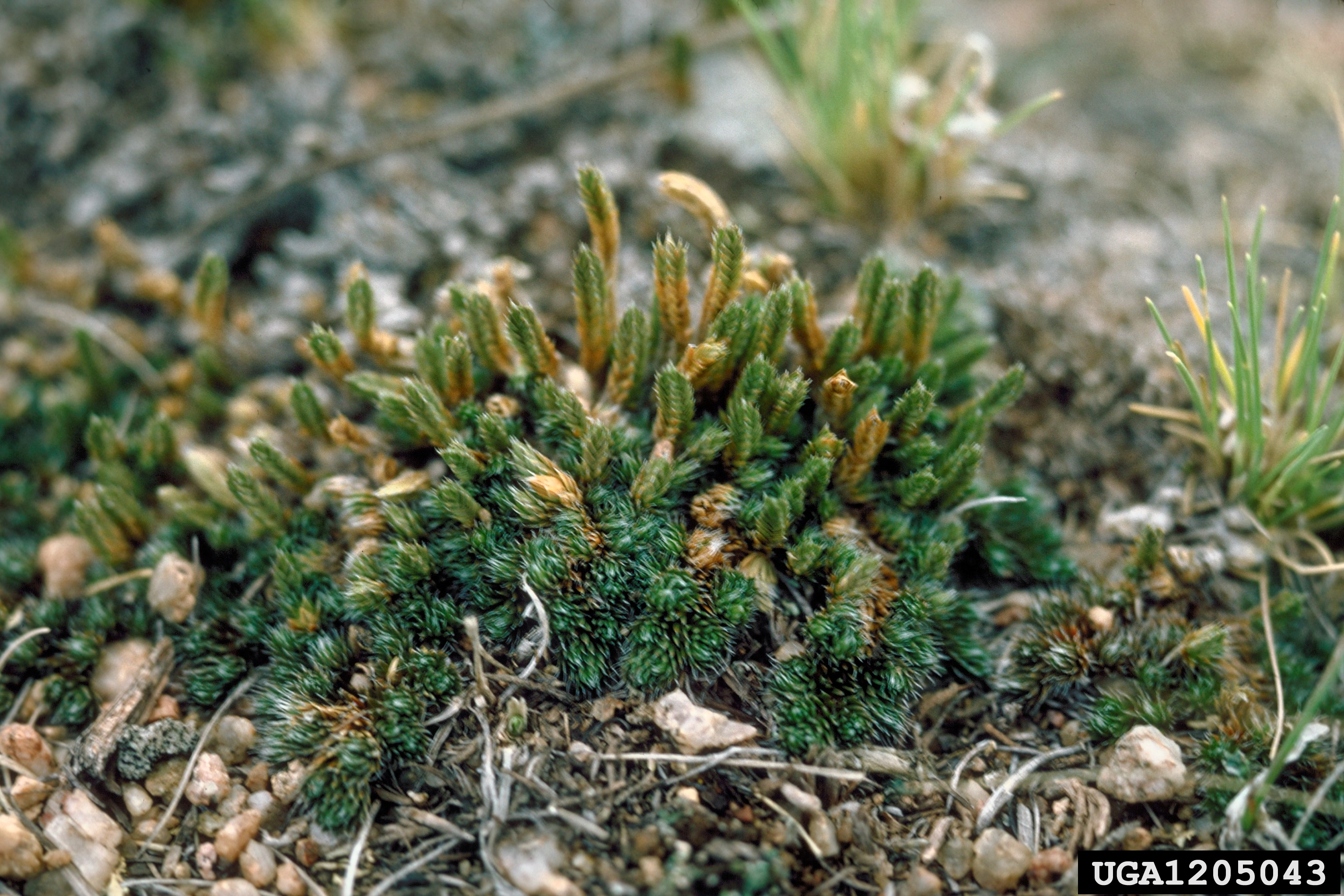

Conservation status
- Secure (NatureServe)

Scientific classification
- Kingdom: Plantae
- Clade: Tracheophytes
- Clade: Lycophytes
- Class: Lycopodiopsida
- Order: Selaginellales
- Family: Selaginellaceae
- Genus: Selaginella
- Species: S. densa

Binomial name
- Selaginella densa Rydb.

= Selaginella densa =

Species of spore-bearing plant

Selaginella densa is a species of spikemoss known by the common names lesser spikemoss, prairie spikemoss, and Rocky Mountains spikemoss. It is native to western North America, where it can be found from Alaska to Ontario, the Dakotas, Texas and far northern California.

It grows in many types of habitat, from grassland to the alpine climates of high mountains, in rocky and sandy areas. It is a dominant plant in many types of prairie on the Great Plains, especially shortgrass prairie, where it grows alongside dominant grasses. It grows in windy, exposed, snow-free rock outcrops on mountain peaks in several ranges, including the Cascade Range and the Front Range of the Rocky Mountains. It is most common on dry soils in open areas, tolerating desiccation relatively easily.

This lycophyte forms mats or cushions of creeping stems which fork into small, upright branches. The green, linear or lance-shaped leaves are up to 5 millimeters long including the short, soft bristles on the tips. They are flattened to the stem. The strobili at the ends of the stems can be up to 3 or 4 centimeters long.

This compact groundcover plant protects the soil from erosion and can be used in landscaping for that purpose.
