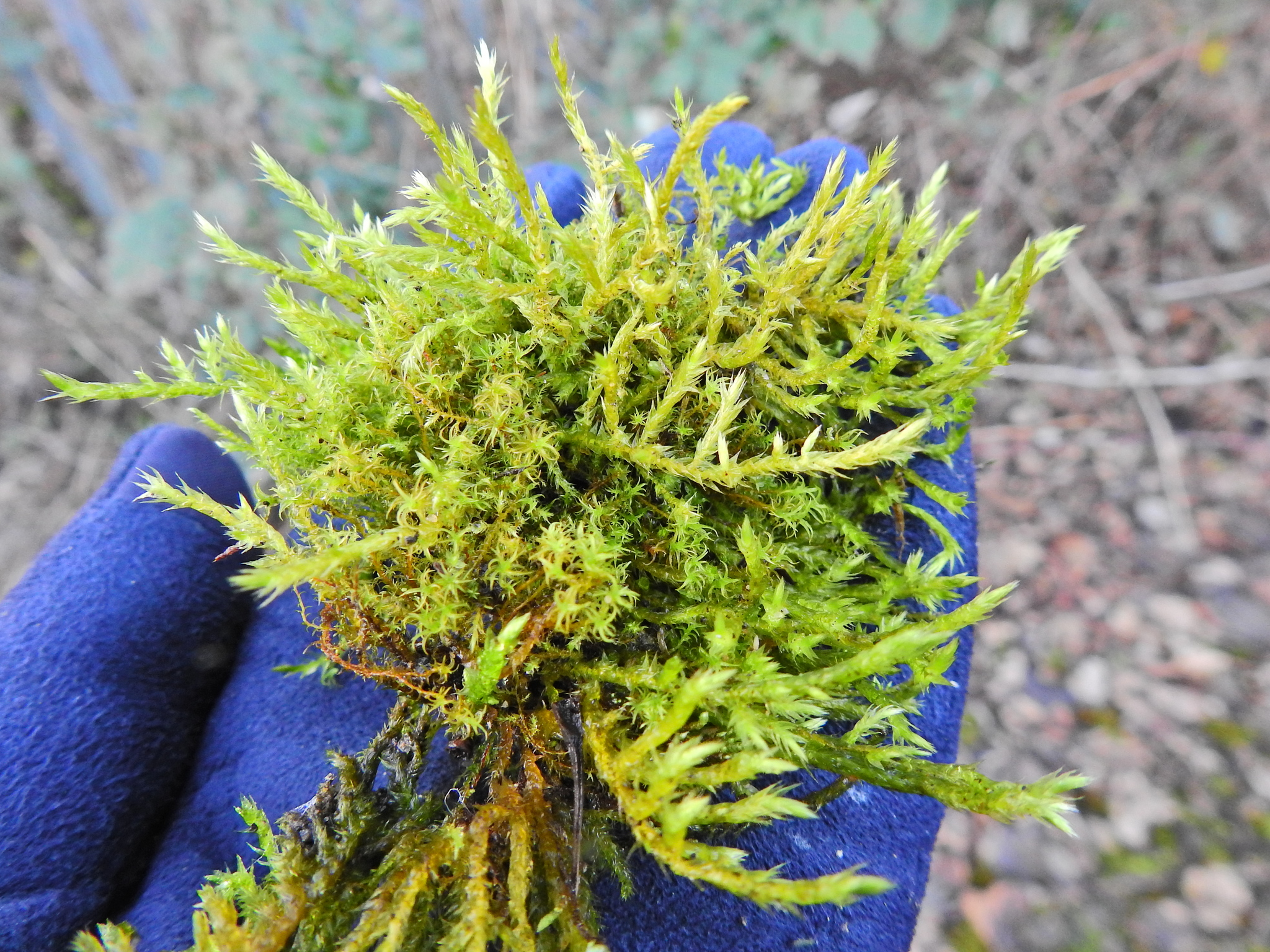

Scientific classification
- Kingdom: Plantae
- Division: Bryophyta
- Class: Bryopsida
- Subclass: Bryidae
- Order: Hypnales
- Family: Pylaisiaceae
- Genus: Calliergonella
- Species: C. cuspidata

Binomial name
- Calliergonella cuspidata Loeske, 1911

= Calliergonella cuspidata =

Species of moss

Calliergonella cuspidata is a species of moss belonging to the family Pylaisiaceae. It is widely distributed around the world.

In a study of the effect of the herbicide Asulam on moss growth, Calliergonella cuspidata was shown to have intermediate sensitivity to Asulam exposure.
