= Howard Alvin Crum =

American bryologist (1922–2002)

Howard A. Crum
- Born: July 14, 1922; Mishawaka, Indiana, U.S.
- Died: April 30, 2002 (aged 79); Ann Arbor, Michigan, U.S.
- Education: Western Michigan University; University of Michigan
- Known for: Bryology
- Scientific career
- Fields: Botany
- Doctoral advisor: Harley Harris Bartlett
- Doctoral students: Dale H. Vitt
- Author abbrev. (botany): H.A.Crum

Howard Alvin Crum (July 14, 1922 – April 30, 2002) was an American botanist dedicated to the study of mosses, and was a renowned expert on the North American bryoflora.

== Early life ==
Crum was born in Mishawaka, Indiana, and after he graduated high school, attended Western Michigan Teachers College (now Western Michigan University). Initially a German major, World War II interrupted his education. He joined the United States Army Air Force in 1942 and served in the Intelligence Division. He was stationed in North Africa and the Middle East working as a cryptographer.

After the war, Crum returned to Western Michigan and changed his major from German to botany. He received his B.S. in 1947. The fall after receiving his undergraduate degree, he began his graduate work at the University of Michigan. He completed his Ph.D. in 1951 under direction of Harley H. Bartlett. Upon finishing his degree, he went to Stanford University for a 2-year postdoc, working with William C. Steere to study moss specimens from Canada, Alaska, and Puerto Rico.

== Career ==
In 1953, Crum left California and accepted a position in the Department of Biology at the University of Kentucky at Louisville. After one year, he left to take up the Curator of Cryptogams position at the National Museum of Canada in Ottawa. Crum worked there for 11 years, and was instrumental in building up their bryological collection. In 1965, he accepted a position as Associate Professor of Botany at the University of Michigan.

He began to work closely with Lewis E. Anderson on a compendium of the mosses of eastern North America. Their research was published in 1981, and recognized about 750 species. With Anderson he edited the exsiccata Mosses of North America. Crum began to teach summer bryology classes at the University of Michigan Biological Station. Realizing that no adequate textbook was available, Crum wrote his own, entitled Mosses of the Great Lakes Forest.

Crum soon turned his attention to the genus Sphagnum. He went on to publish over 100 taxa new to science. Around this time, he and Aaron John Sharp produced the Moss Flora of Mexico. Crum gained much knowledge into the Mexican moss flora through his doctoral dissertation, which he used to help create this modern moss treatment for a tropical region, the first of its kind. In the meantime, he continued to publish his Sphagnum research.

He soon gained interest in the liverworts and hornworts, and continued his studies until his death from stomach cancer at age 79.

== Legacy ==
Crum is the namesake of three genera: Bryocrumia, Crumia, and Crumuscus; and eight species: Bellia crumii, Encalypta brevicollis subsp. crumiana, Fissidens crumii, Macromitrium crumianum, Ochrobryum crumii, Racomitrium crumianum, Schlotheimia crumii, and Sphagnum crumii.

== Selected publications ==
- Crum, Howard (1973). Mosses of the Great Lakes Forest. University Herbarium, University of Michigan.
- Crum, Howard A.; Anderson, Lewis E. (1981). Mosses of Eastern North America. Columbia University Press.
- Crum, Howard (1991). Liverworts and Hornworts of Southern Michigan. University Herbarium, University of Michigan.
- Sharp, Aaron John; Crum, Howard Alvin; Eckel, Patricia (1994). The Moss Flora of Mexico. New York Botanical Garden.

The standard author abbreviation H.A.Crum is used to indicate this person as the author when citing a botanical name.
