= Hugo Leander Blomquist =

Swedish bryologist

- Hugo L. Blomquist
- Born: June 5, 1888; Sorsele, Sweden
- Died: November 28, 1964 (aged 79); Durham, North Carolina
- Citizenship: United States
- Education: University of Chicago
- Scientific career
- Fields: Botany
- Workplaces: Duke University
- Doctoral advisor: William Jesse Goad Land
- Author abbrev. (botany): H.L.Blomq.

Hugo Leander Blomquist (June 5, 1888 – November 28, 1964) was a Swedish-born American botanist. His well rounded expertise encompassed fungi, bacteria, bryophytes, algae, grasses, and ferns. The standard author abbreviation H.L.Blomq. is used to indicate this person as the author when citing a botanical name.

== Early life ==
Although several sources state his birth year as 1885, Blomquist was actually born in 1888 in Sorsele, Sweden. In 1892, his family emigrated to Kulm, North Dakota. He earned his B.S. in botany from the University of Chicago in 1916. He enrolled in graduate school, but his studies were interrupted by World War I. From 1917 to 1919, Blomquist served as a musician first class in the U.S. Army. After the war, he briefly studied at Pasteur Institute before finishing his Ph.D. at the University of Chicago. He completed his doctorate in botany under William Jesse Goad Land in 1921.

== Career ==
Blomquist was hired as Assistant Professor of Biology at Trinity College, now Duke University, after his graduation in 1921. He was promoted to full professorship two years later, and in 1935, he became Chairman of Botany. Although retired in 1953, he remained as an emeritus professor. He was active in his field until a few years before his death. Blomquist started the herbarium at Duke after arranging the purchase of the collections of P. O. Schallert.

Throughout his career, Blomquist had a leading role in many botanical societies. He served as chairman of the Southeastern Section of the Botanical Society of America, president of the American Fern Society, president of the American Bryological and Lichenological Society, president of the Southern Appalachian Botanical Society, president of the North Carolina Academy of Science, and president/founding member of the Association of Southeastern Biologists. He was also a fellow of the American Association for the Advancement of Science and a member of several other groups.

== Legacy ==
About 3,500 of Blomquist's specimens are cataloged by the University of North Carolina Herbarium, and the Duke University Herbarium holds about 10,000 of his specimens. The H.L. Blomquist Garden of Southeastern Native Plants, part of the Sarah P. Duke Gardens at Duke University, is named for him.

The Hugo L. Blomquist Professor of Psychology & Neuroscience is a distinguished professorship at Duke University.

== Selected publications ==
- Blomquist, H.L. (1931) Genetics of mosses. Journ. Elisha Mitchell Sci. Soc. 46: 267-275. JSTOR 24332345
- Blomquist, H.L. (1934) Ferns of North Carolina. Durham, North Carolina: Duke University Press. [with an introduction by Donald C. Peattie].
- Blomquist, H.L. (1938) Peat mosses of the southeastern States. Jour. Elisha Mitchell Sci. Soc. 54: 1-21.
- Blomquist, H.L. (1939) Grasses new to North Carolina. Castanea 4 (4/5): 50-55. JSTOR 4031143
- Williams, Louis G. and H.L. Blomquist (1947) A collection of marine algae from Brazil. Bull. Torrey Bot. Club 74(5): 383-397. doi:10.2307/2482061
- Blomquist, H.L. (1948) The grasses of North Carolina. Durham, North Carolina: Duke University Press.
- Greene, Wilhelmina F. and Hugo L. Blomquist (1953) Flowers of the South, Native and Exotic. Chapel Hill North Carolina: University of North Carolina Press.
