= Hampstead Heath Woods =

Woodland in London, England

Coordinates: 51.5680°N 0.16709°W

- Site of Special Scientific Interest
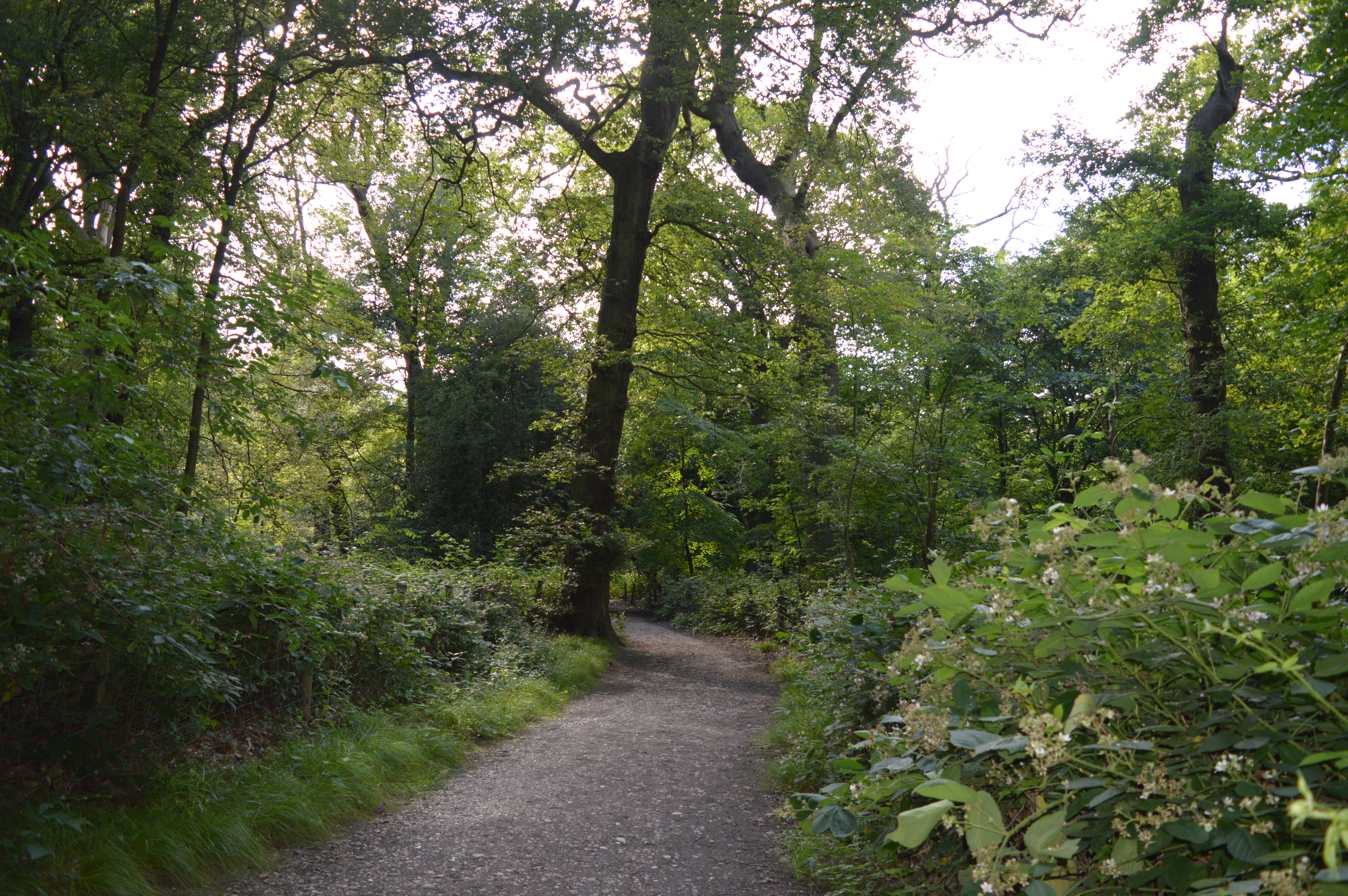
- Path in Ken Wood
- Location of Hampstead Heath Woods.
- Area of search: Greater London
- Grid reference: TQ270875; TQ271870
- Interest: Biological
- Area: 16.6 ha (41 acres)
- Notification date: 1990
- Location map: Magic Map

Hampstead Heath Woods is a 16.6-hectare (41-acre) biological Site of Special Scientific Interest in Hampstead in the London Borough of Camden. It is in two separate areas within Hampstead Heath, North Wood between Kenwood House and Hampstead Lane, and the larger Ken Wood, south of Kenwood House. It was designated as a Site of Special Scientific Interest in 1975. It is the only Site of Special Scientific Interest in Camden and is managed by English Heritage.

The site has many old and over-mature trees, and extensive dead wood which provides a habitat for fungi, nesting birds and invertebrates, including the nationally rare jewel beetle Agrilus pannonicus. This type of canopy is uncommon nationally and very scarce in Greater London. The main trees are sessile oak and beech, with a few pedunculate oaks and wild service trees. The shrub layer is dominated by holly and rowan. Many bat species have been found in the area, with the ancient hollow trees on the site thought to support these populations. Next to Ken Wood is a small valley which has soft-rush, six sphagnum species and water horsetail. Sphagnum is rare in London, with bog mosses in this protected area including sphagnum fimbriatum, sphagnum palustre and sphagnum squarrosum.

== See also ==
- List of Sites of Special Scientific Interest in Greater London
