= Laurel Farm Meadow =

Biological site in Suffolk, England

Coordinates: 52.381°N 1.41°E

- Site of Special Scientific Interest
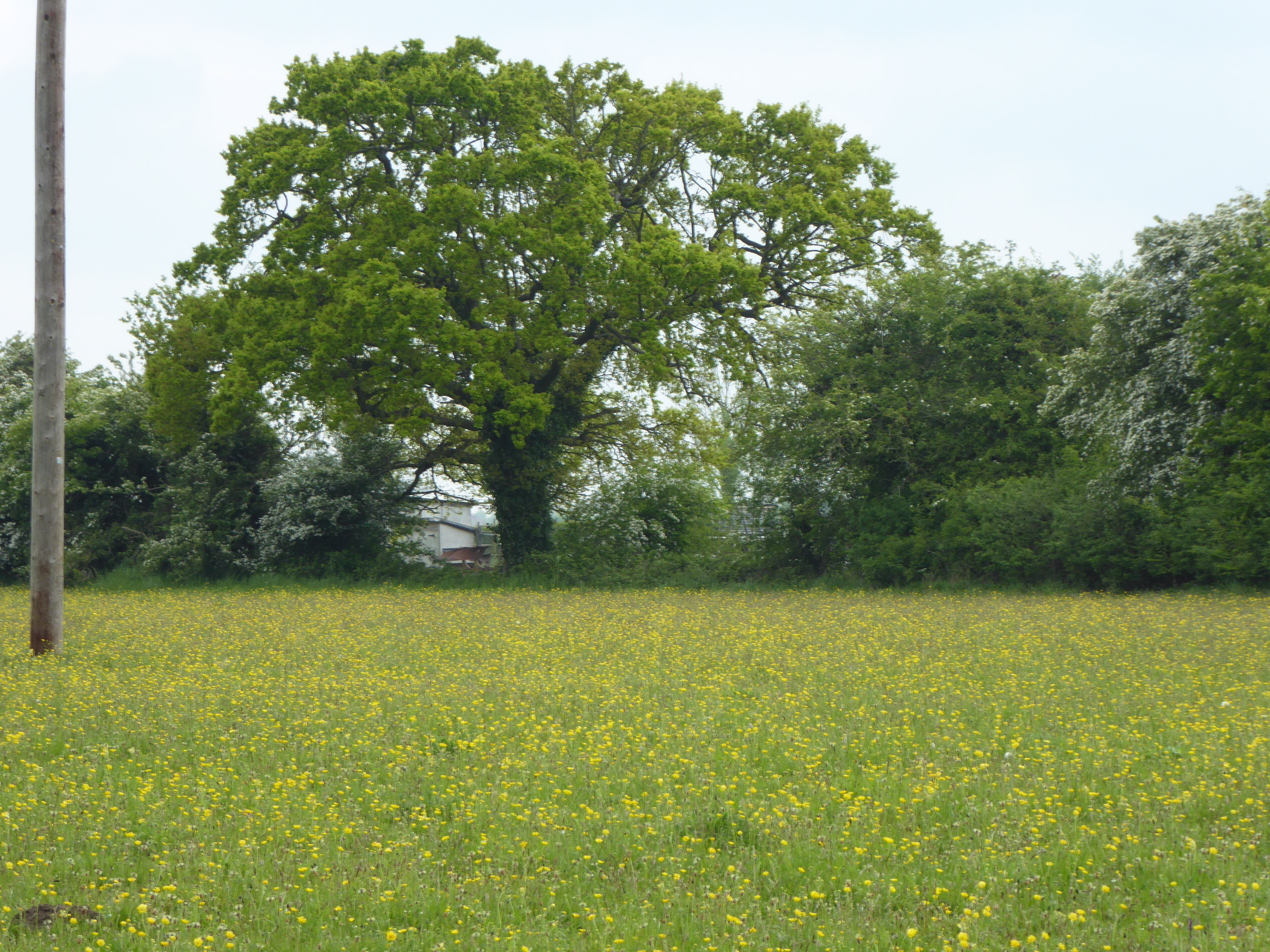
- Location of Laurel Farm Meadow.
- Area of search: Suffolk
- Grid reference: TM 322 814
- Interest: Biological
- Area: 1.6 hectares
- Notification date: 1995
- Location map: Magic Map

Laurel Farm Meadow is a 1.6-hectare (4.0-acre) biological Site of Special Scientific Interest north-west of Halesworth in Suffolk.

This mesotrophic grassland site has diverse flora, and it is a type of meadow which is rare in Britain and not found in mainland Europe. The soil is chalky clay which is seasonally waterlogged. There are eleven species of grass, herbs such as fairy flax and cowslip, and many green-winged orchids.

A public footpath from St James Road goes through the site.
