= Mesotrophic =

Mesotrophic may refer to:

- Mesotrophic lake
- Mesotrophic soil

== See also ==
- Oligotrophic
- Eutrophic
