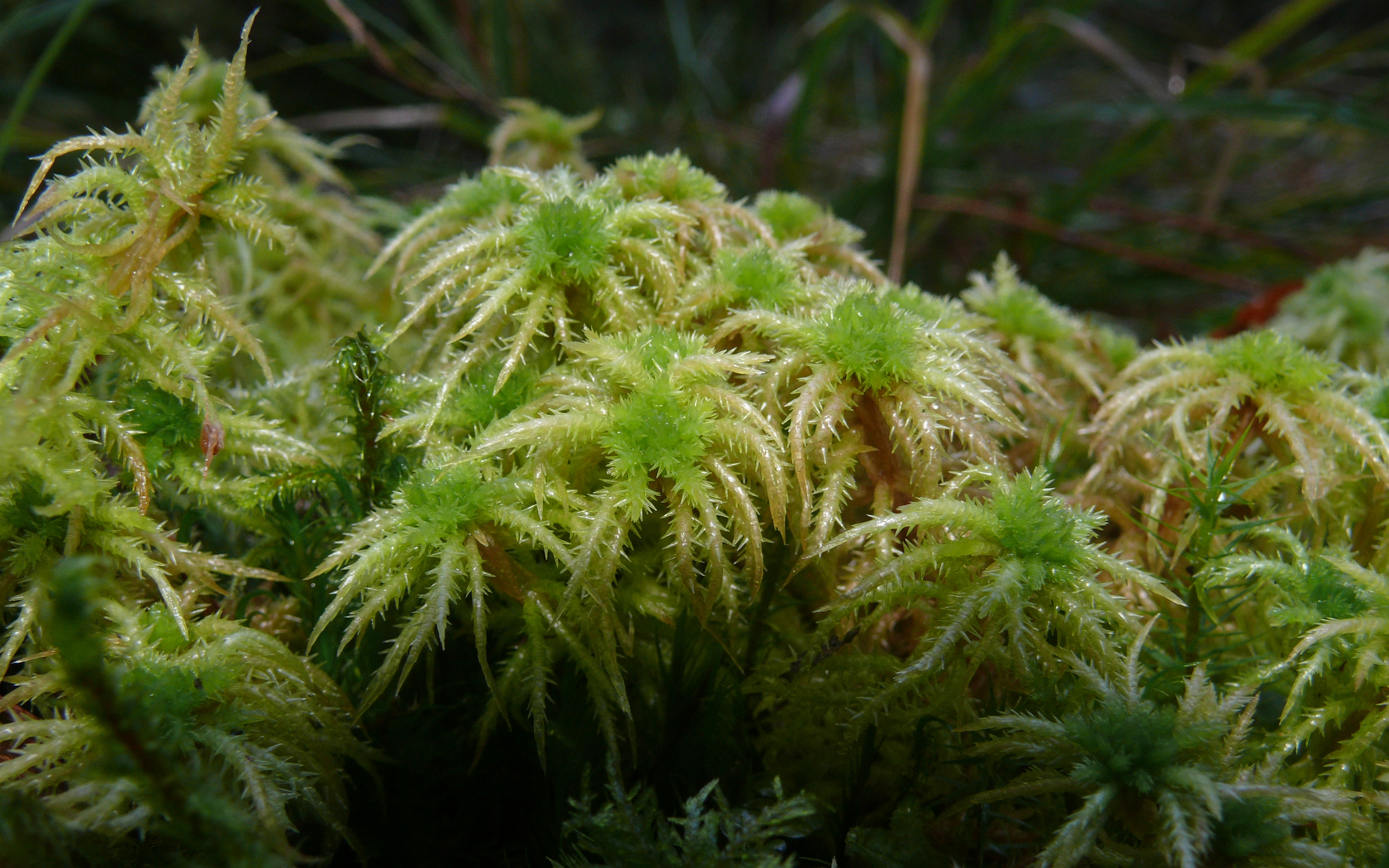

Conservation status
- Least Concern (IUCN 3.1) (Europe regional assessment)

- Secure (NatureServe)

Scientific classification
- Kingdom: Plantae
- Clade: Embryophytes
- Division: Bryophyta
- Class: Sphagnopsida
- Subclass: Sphagnidae
- Order: Sphagnales
- Family: Sphagnaceae
- Genus: Sphagnum
- Species: S. squarrosum

Binomial name
- Sphagnum squarrosum Crome

Synonyms
- List: Sphagnum semisquarrosum (Russow ex Warnst.) Lepage; Sphagnum crassisetum Brid.; Sphagnum squarrosum var. imbricatum Schimp.; Sphagnum squarrosum var. semi-squarrosum Russow ex Warnst.; Sphagnum cymbifolium var. squarrosum (Crome) Nees & Hornsch.; Sphagnum latifolium var. squarrosum (Crome) Wahlenb.; Sphagnum squarrosum var. immersum Beckett ex Warnst.; Sphagnum teres subsp. squarrosum (Crome) Warnst.; Sphagnum teres var. squarrosum (Crome) Warnst.; Sphagnum imbricatum var. brachycladum (Warnst.) Röll; Sphagnum obtusifolium var. crassisetum (Brid.) Sw.; Sphagnum squarrosum f. brachycladum Warnst.; Sphagnum squarrosum var. capitatum Röll; Sphagnum squarrosum var. compactum Warnst.; Sphagnum squarrosum f. cuspidatum (Warnst.) Warnst.; Sphagnum squarrosum f. densum Russow ex Warnst.; Sphagnum squarrosum f. elegans (Röll) Warnst.; Sphagnum squarrosum f. flagellare (Röll) Warnst.; Sphagnum squarrosum var. fuscolutescens C.E.O.Jensen; Sphagnum squarrosum f. gracile Russow ex Warnst.; Sphagnum squarrosum f. humile (Schlieph. ex Röll) Röll; Sphagnum squarrosum f. molle (Röll) Warnst.; Sphagnum squarrosum f. patulum (Röll) Warnst.; Sphagnum squarrosum f. pycnocladum Wheldon; Sphagnum squarrosum f. robustum (Röll) Warnst.; Sphagnum squarrosum f. silvaticum Wheldon; Sphagnum squarrosum var. spectabile Russow; Sphagnum squarrosum var. strictiforme Röll; Sphagnum squarrosum var. submersum Röll; Sphagnum squarrosum f. subsquarrosum (Russow) C.E.O.Jensen; Sphagnum teres var. cuspidatum (Warnst.) Cardot; Sphagnum teres var. imbricatum (Schimp.) Warnst.; Sphagnum teres f. immersum Warnst.; Sphagnum teres f. strictum Warnst.; Sphagnum squarrosum var. brachycladum (Warnst.) Grav. ex Röll; Sphagnum squarrosum var. cuspidatum Warnst.; Sphagnum squarrosum f. densum (Röll) Warnst.; Sphagnum squarrosum var. densum Röll; Sphagnum squarrosum f. elegans Russow ex Warnst.; Sphagnum squarrosum var. elegans Röll; Sphagnum squarrosum var. flagellare Röll; Sphagnum squarrosum var. gracile (Russow ex Warnst.) Röll; Sphagnum squarrosum var. humile Schlieph. ex Röll; Sphagnum squarrosum f. imbricatum (Schimp.) C.E.O.Jensen; Sphagnum squarrosum f. immersum (Warnst.) C.L.Beckm. ex Warnst.; Sphagnum squarrosum var. molle Röll; Sphagnum squarrosum var. patulum Röll; Sphagnum squarrosum var. robustum Röll; Sphagnum squarrosum var. strictum (Warnst.) Röll; Sphagnum squarrosum var. subsquarrosum Russow; Sphagnum squarrosum var. tenellum Röll; Sphagnum teres var. compactum (Warnst.) Cardot

= Sphagnum squarrosum =

Species of moss

Sphagnum squarrosum, commonly known as the spiky bog-moss or spreading-leaved bog moss, is a peat moss species found in nutrient-rich, damp soils and wetlands across the Northern Hemisphere, with isolated populations in South America. Its spiky appearance, resulting from strongly spreading branch leaves, distinguishes it from other peat moss species. Playing an important role in wetland succession, the species is one of the first Sphagnum mosses to colonise developing wetlands. It shows considerable tolerance to mineral-rich conditions and actively modifies its habitat through cation exchange processes.

Unlike many other peat mosses that require highly acidic conditions, S. squarrosum thrives in areas with moderate calcium levels, particularly along stream banks, in fens, and in wet woodlands dominated by Salix (willows) and Betula (birches). It disperses efficiently, producing more spores per capsule and per patch than other Sphagnum species. It shows high genetic diversity across its range, having survived the Last Glacial Maximum in multiple European refugia. The species serves as the specific host for the fungal parasite Discinella schimperi, which infects about half of all documented populations.

== Taxonomy ==
Sphagnum squarrosum was first formally described by Johann Friedrich Crome in 1803, with the type specimen collected from "Schelfwerder in dem Torfmoore" near Schwerin, Germany. Although Christiaan Hendrik Persoon is sometimes cited as the authority for this species, his use of the name remained only in manuscript form. It did not become valid until its later publication by Friedrich Weber and Daniel Matthias Heinrich Mohr in 1804. Both Crome and Olof Swartz (in Palmstruch 1803) independently published the name S. squarrosum in the same year without referencing previous authors. Under the rules of botanical nomenclature, the Danish botanist Christian Theodore Dusén selected Crome's publication as having priority, since the exact date of Crome's collection is known (July 1803), whereas only the year is known for Palmstruch's publication.

The species is the type for section Squarrosa of the genus Sphagnum. Although closely related to Sphagnum teres, the two are morphologically and ecologically distinct, justifying their classification as separate species. This distinction is further supported by cytological evidence, with S. squarrosum reported to have double the chromosome number of S. teres.

Over time, the species has accumulated numerous synonyms and infraspecific taxa, reflecting its morphological variability across its wide geographical range. Notable among these are S. semisquarrosum (Russow ex Warnst.) Lepage and various forms and varieties such as var. squarrosulum G.Müller and var. semisquarrosum Russow ex Warnstorf.

== Description ==
Sphagnum squarrosum is readily identified by its distinctive spiky appearance, which sets it apart from other peat mosses. This large, robust species forms loose carpets in pale to yellow-green colours, though it may develop pale brown colouration in exposed alpine or arctic habitats. Its common name "spiky bog-moss" comes from its most striking feature: branch leaves that spread outward at sharp angles from the branches like tiny stars, a growth pattern botanists term squarrose.

The plant's structure follows the typical Sphagnum pattern, but with distinctive characteristics. At its crown, it possesses a very large and prominent apical bud. The stem is strong, measuring 0.7–1.3 mm in diameter, with a dark brown internal cylinder that becomes paler in shade forms. The stem cortex comprises 2–3 layers of hyaline (colourless and translucent) cells, with the superficial layer showing indistinct thinnings known as 'shadow pores'. The branch cortex contains specialised pore-bearing cells called retort cells (flask-shaped cells that aid in water conduction), which are often relatively indistinct from other cortical cells and occurring in groups of one to four, with an internal cylinder that is pale brown or yellowish. The branches are arranged in fascicles (clusters) of 4–6, with 2–3 spreading branches measuring 20–30 mm or more, and 2–3 pendent branches of 8–30 mm.

The stem leaves are shorter than the branch leaves, measuring 1.6–1.8 mm long, and have an ovate-lingulate to oblong-lingulate shape with broadly rounded tips. These leaves possess short-lived borders 2–3 cells wide that are often lost in older leaves, though they persist longer than in S. teres. Branch leaves are larger, measuring 1.9–3.3 mm long, with a broadened base that abruptly contracts at the middle to form pronounced 'shoulders' before tapering to a sharply reflexed, acuminate limb. The lower half remains erect and concave, forming a sheath around the branch.

Morphology
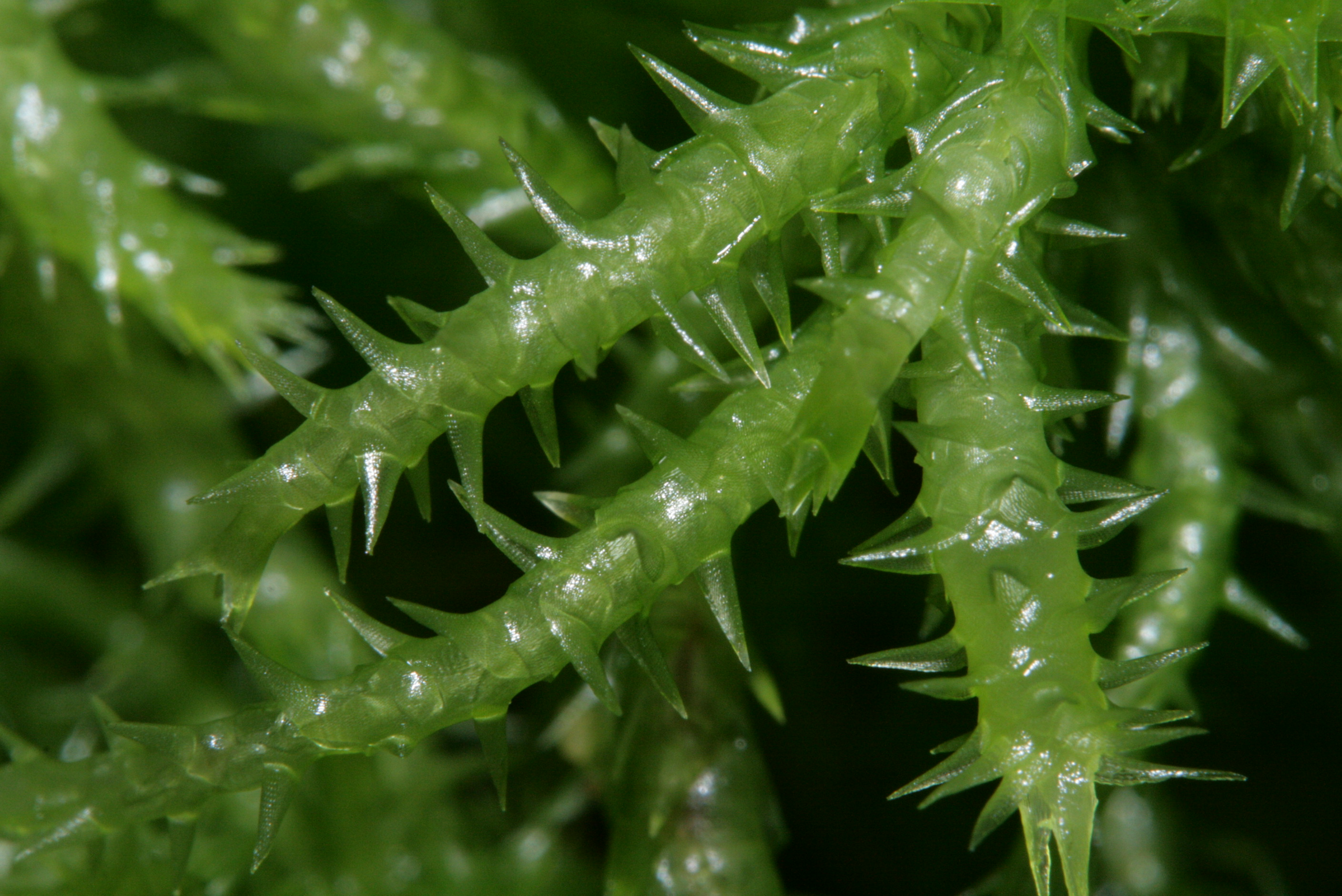
Close-up of branches showing the distinctive squarrose (outward-spreading) branch leaves that give Sphagnum squarrosum its common name 'spiky bog-moss'

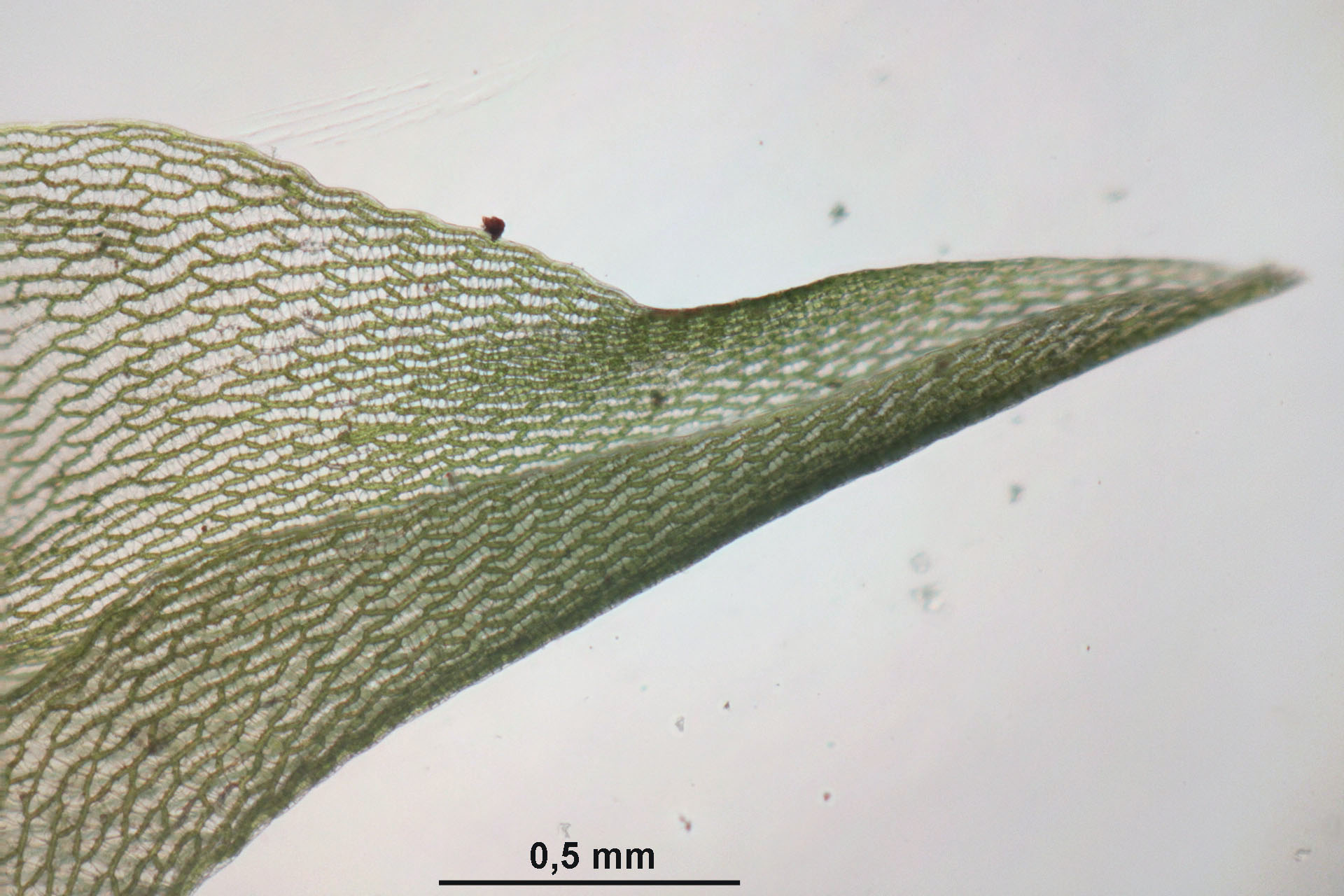
Microscope view of leaf showing the network of photosynthetic (chlorocysts) and water-storage (leucocysts) cells.
Scale bar: 0.5 mm

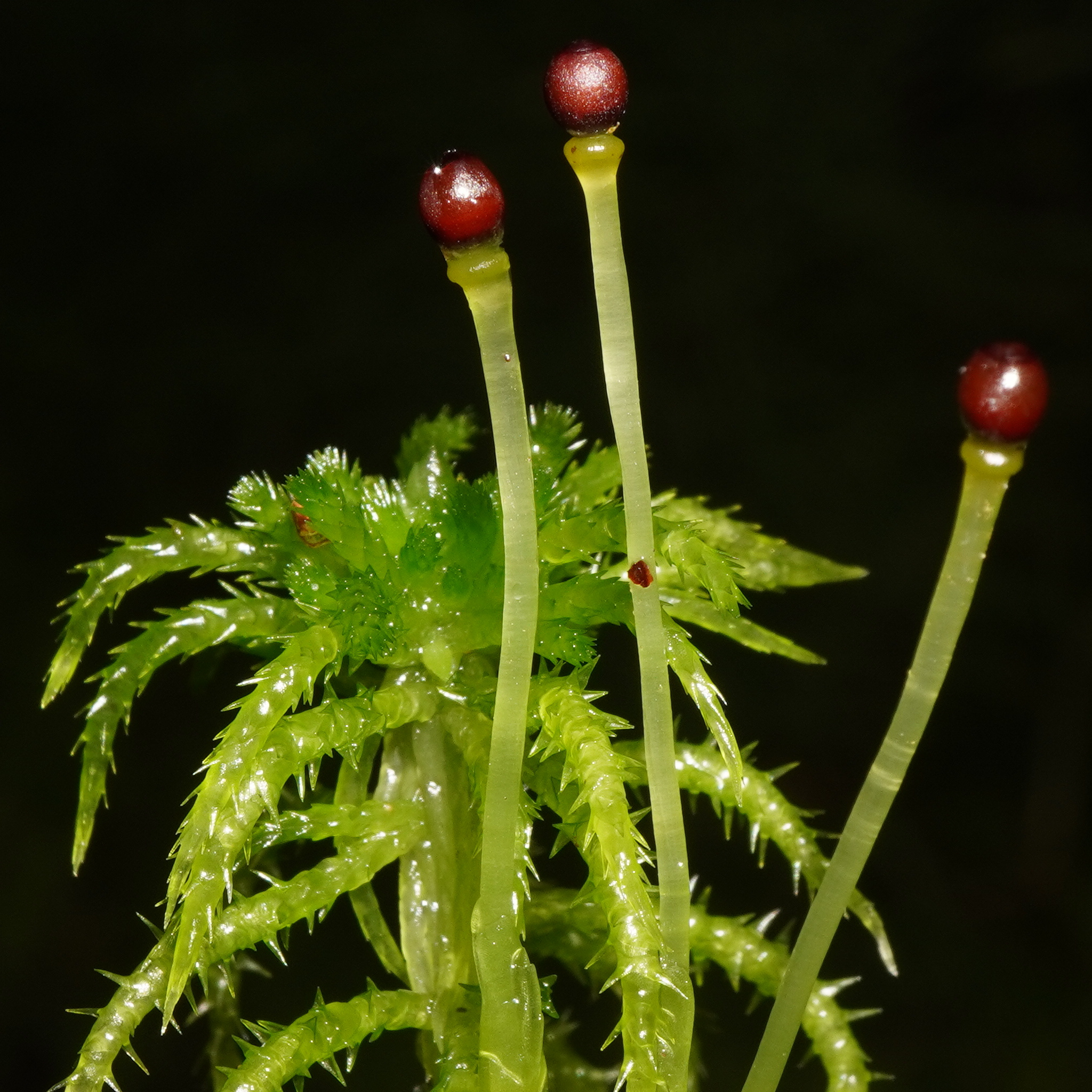
Mature sporophytes (reddish-brown capsules) elevated on pale pseudopodia above the characteristic spiky gametophyte

At the cellular level, S. squarrosum shares the specialised cell structure common to all Sphagnum species. It possesses two types of cells: hyaline cells (leucocysts), which store water and give the plant its impressive water-holding capacity, and photosynthetic cells (chlorocysts). In the squarrose limb, hyaline cells are relatively small (70–100 × 15–22 μm) but become larger towards the lower margins (up to 200 × 30–50 μm). They bear 2–6 large, distinctly ringed pores on their adaxial surface, with similar or slightly fewer pores on the abaxial surface. The photosynthetic cells appear narrowly oval-triangular to trapezoidal in cross-section and reach both surfaces, though they are more widely exposed on the abaxial surface.

At the reproductive level, S. squarrosum produces both male and female structures on the same plant. The antheridial bracts are densely imbricated (overlapping) and often show yellowish or pale brown colouration; they resemble branch leaves but are smaller and have less divergent apices. The inner perichaetial bracts are large with relatively narrow insertion points, becoming broad above with a retuse (slightly notched) apex, with abaxial resorption gaps and eroded apex. When present, the spore capsules contain yellow-brown, papillose spores. The branch anatomy includes retort cells, which are often indistinct from other cortical cells and occur in groups of one to four. The internal cylinder is pale brown or yellowish.

The species shows some phenotypic plasticity in response to environmental conditions. In temperate regions, it typically appears more robust and develops fuller growth in shaded habitats, particularly along brook margins and in wet parts of forest floors. However, in subarctic and arctic regions, it commonly achieves similar robust growth in open, treeless areas.

=== Diagnostic features and similar species ===
Sphagnum squarrosum is typically recognisable by its robust habit, bright green to yellow-green colouration, and distinctive "bottle brush" appearance created by its strongly squarrose branch leaves. This characteristic spiky appearance is most pronounced in well-developed plants, though it may be less obvious in some forms.

Several other Sphagnum species may be confused with S. squarrosum under certain conditions. Its closest relative, S. teres, can appear similar, particularly when S. squarrosum produces weaker growth forms with less pronounced leaf squarrosity. In such cases, microscopic examination becomes necessary for definitive identification, though even this may be challenging due to gradation of characters in extreme forms of both species.

Shade forms of S. palustre may superficially resemble S. squarrosum, but can be distinguished by two key features: the roughened, cucullate (hood-shaped) apices of their branch leaves and the presence of spiral fibrils in their branch cortex. While S. compactum can also produce squarrose-leaved forms, it is readily distinguished by its notably minute stem leaves.

In exposed alpine or arctic habitats, S. squarrosum may develop a pale brown colouration rather than its typical green hues. The species shows some morphological plasticity in response to environmental conditions, with shade forms often developing a paler internal stem cylinder compared to the typically dark brown colouration of plants from more exposed sites.

== Habitat, distribution, and ecology ==
Sphagnum squarrosum has a broad geographical range spanning much of the Northern Hemisphere, occurring throughout North America and Eurasia. While it is widely distributed, the species shows particular concentration in northern regions of Europe. Its circumpolar range has been well-documented through specimens from Canada (including the Northwest Territories and Yukon), the United States (including Alaska), Greenland, multiple European countries, Japan, and various regions of Russia. The 2017 report of populations in southeastern Brazil has extended its known range into South America, representing its southernmost occurrence globally.

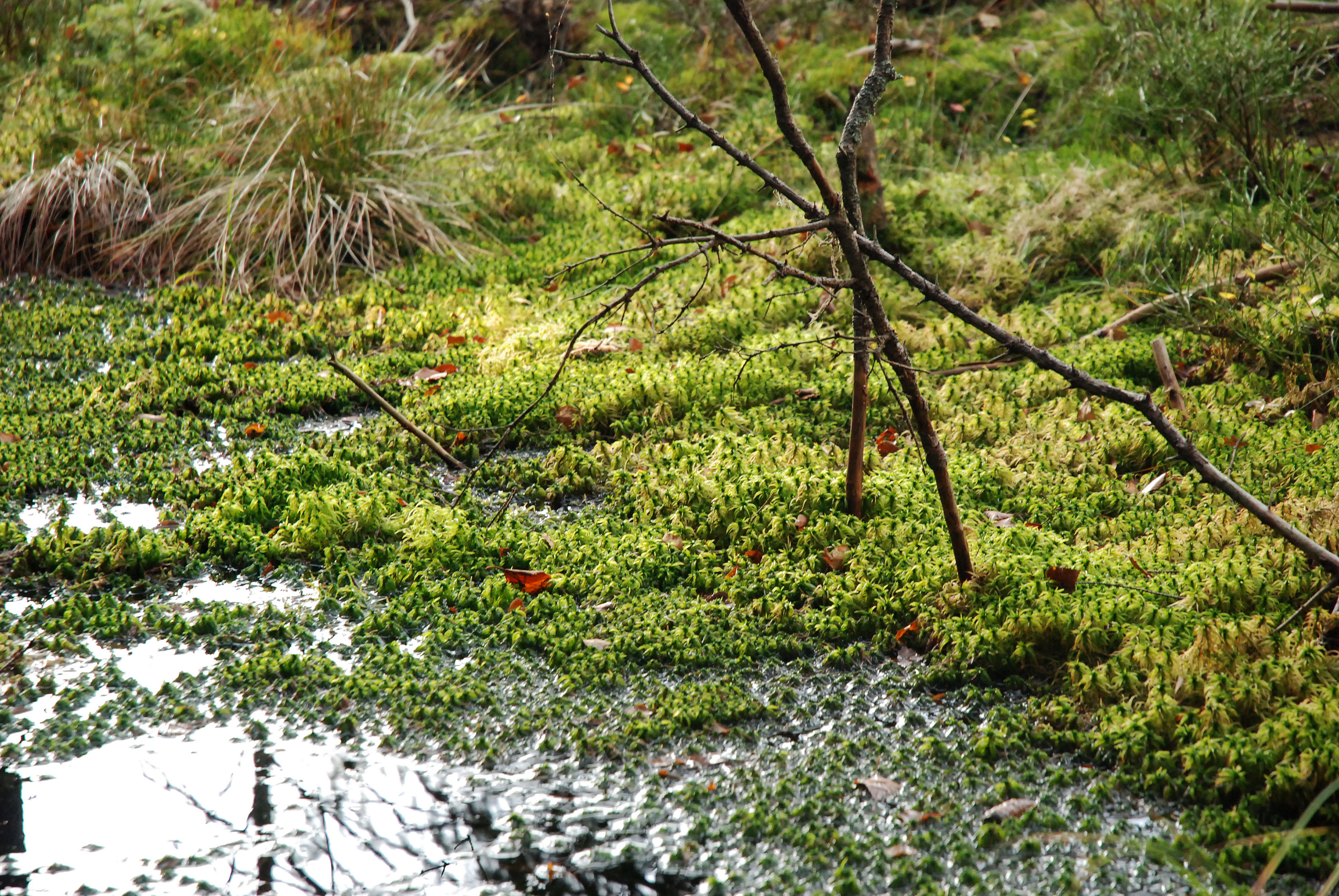
Sphagnum squarrosum forming characteristic green carpets at the edge of standing water in Torfowisko pod Zieleńcem Nature Reserve, Poland

Unlike many other peat mosses that require highly acidic conditions, S. squarrosum thrives in mineral-rich environments with moderate calcium levels. This tolerance is supported by laboratory studies showing the species maintains consistent photosynthetic rates across a wide pH range (5.2–7.5). The species actively shapes its environment through cation exchange, absorbing calcium and releasing protons to gradually alter water chemistry. This ability makes it an important pioneer species in wetland development, often appearing alongside S. fimbriatum in early successional stages before more acid-loving bog species can establish.

The species shows distinct habitat preferences across its range. In temperate eastern Canada, it is more commonly found in shaded habitats, particularly along brook margins and wet parts of forest floors. In contrast, in subarctic to arctic regions, it grows in open, treeless areas. It typically inhabits mesotrophic to slightly eutrophic conditions, growing in wet habitats such as river banks, pond edges, fens, and woodland carr dominated by Salix, Betula or Alnus species. In North America, it is particularly associated with woodlands subject to seasonal flooding, swamps, and stream margins, while in montane regions it can also colonise wet rock ledges.

The species reaches its northernmost extent in Svalbard (Norway), where it is the most prevalent Sphagnum species. Here, at about 80°32.5'N at Nordkapp, at the northern extreme of Chermsideøya on Nordaustlandet, it grows from sea level to approximately 300 m (980 ft) elevation, forming low mats or cushions on moist, gently sloping moss-rich tundra and mineral-rich water seepages. Unlike its growth patterns elsewhere, in Svalbard it typically occurs in pure stands rather than mixing with other Sphagnum species. It develops a distinctly yellowish-green to pale yellowish-brown colouration, with brown, pale brown or yellowish-brown stems.

Sphagnum squarrosum is ecologically adaptable throughout its range. It can withstand periods of dryness and grows successfully in both rain-fed and ground water conditions. The species shows particularly vigorous growth when nutrients are abundant, responding positively to enrichment. This adaptability is further evidenced by its wide altitudinal range, occurring from sea level to elevations of at least 1,100 m (3,600 ft).

== Reproduction and dispersal ==
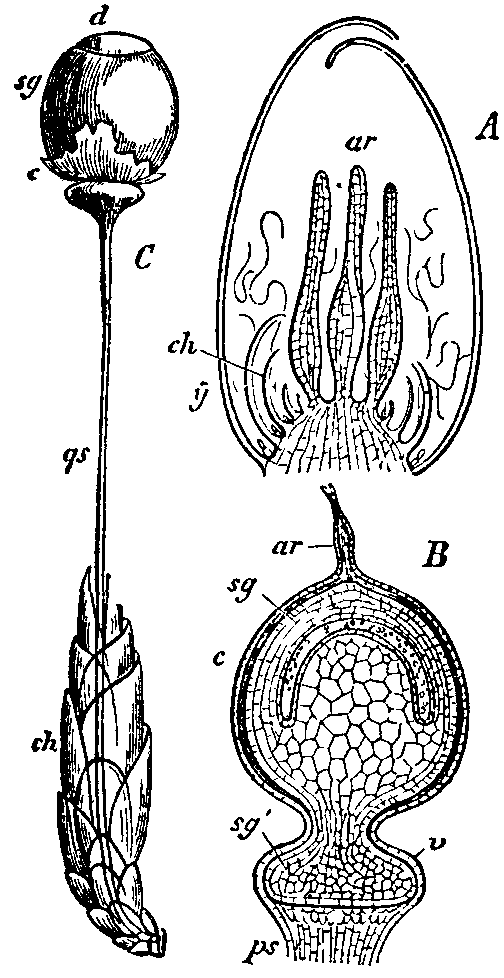
Historical illustration of Sphagnum reproductive structures: (C) mature sporophyte showing capsule and pseudopodium; (A) longitudinal section of developing archegonium; (B) cross-section of mature capsule showing spore chamber and air space.

Sphagnum squarrosum is a monoicious species (having both male and female reproductive organs on the same plant) and frequently produces spores throughout its range. The species has efficient dispersal capabilities. Among studied Sphagnum species, it produces both the highest number of spores per capsule and the highest overall spore output per patch of growth. Studies have found no evidence of reduced fitness in self-fertilised plants.

Large capsules and small spores enhance the species' long-distance dispersal efficiency. Compared to other Sphagnum species, Sphagnum squarrosum retains fewer spores within its capsules after dispersal, resulting in greater spore release and wider distribution.

Research on island colonization reveals that S. squarrosum is an effective long-distance disperser, successfully establishing populations as far as 40 km (25 mi) from parent sources. The species is notable for being able to colonise habitats closer to the sea than other Sphagnum species, demonstrating higher tolerance to salt spray and ionic concentrations. Like other Sphagnum mosses, spore production in natural populations is relatively rare, with studies finding only about 2% of patches producing spore capsules. However, as a monoicious species, S. squarrosum has greater potential for successful spore production compared to unisexual Sphagnum species that require separate male and female plants in close proximity. With approximately 243,000 spores per capsule, S. squarrosum produces the highest recorded spore output among Sphagnum species. This high spore output is achieved through a combination of large capsules (averaging about 6 cubic millimetres in volume) and relatively small spores (averaging 25.8 micrometres (μm) in diameter, with individual spores ranging from 19–30 μm). The size of spores shows a curvilinear relationship with capsule size, with larger capsules generally producing more spores.

The species uses an 'air gun' dispersal mechanism, where spores are explosively discharged from the capsule by built-up air pressure (approximately 5 × 10^{5} Pascals) during warm, dry conditions. S. squarrosum's large capsules are particularly effective at this dispersal method, shooting spores higher into the air than smaller-capsuled species. Studies have shown that only about 7% of spores remain in the capsule after discharge, with another 7% landing within the parent colony. The fact that only about 11% of released spores are found within 3.2 m (10 ft) of the parent plant suggests the majority of spores are capable of long-distance dispersal.

== Evolutionary history ==
Genetic studies of European populations suggest that S. squarrosum likely survived the Last Glacial Maximum in multiple scattered refugia across Europe. Analysis of chloroplast DNA variation indicates that the species maintained relatively stable historical population sizes and experienced less severe population bottlenecks during glacial periods compared to some other Sphagnum species.

The species has high genetic diversity, with widely distributed haplotypes and weak geographic structure in Europe. This pattern suggests the species spread from multiple refugial populations after the last ice age. Some genetic variants found at higher altitudes may represent ancient lineages that were once more widely distributed across European tundra following the LGM.

== Fossil history ==
Sphagnum squarrosum appears in late Holocene subfossil records, notably from peat deposits in northwestern Iran dating back approximately 2,000 years. These subfossil remains were found in the Tuska Tchal peat bog at an elevation of 1,034 m (3,392 ft), where evidence suggests the species was continuously present from around 2,000 years ago through to recent times. The presence of associated sphagnophilous (Sphagnum-loving) organisms in these deposits, including the fungus Geoglossum sphagnophilum and the rotifer species Habrotrocha angusticollis, further confirms the long-term presence of S. squarrosum at this site.

These Iranian subfossil populations may be glacial relicts from the last ice age, when colder conditions allowed the species to expand its range southward. Such findings suggest that highland wetland sites in Iran served as interglacial refugia for boreal species like S. squarrosum.

== Associated species ==
Sphagnum squarrosum is a specific host to the fungal parasite Discinella schimperi (formerly Helotium schimperi), which infects specialised mucilaginous cells in the moss. The fungus is highly host-specific, infecting only S. squarrosum and not other Sphagnum species. Herbarium studies indicate that about half or more of examined S. squarrosum samples were infected with D. schimperi, suggesting a widespread relationship between the two species. The fungus has been documented throughout the moss's circumpolar range, including North America, Europe, and Asia.

== See also ==
- List of Sphagnum species
