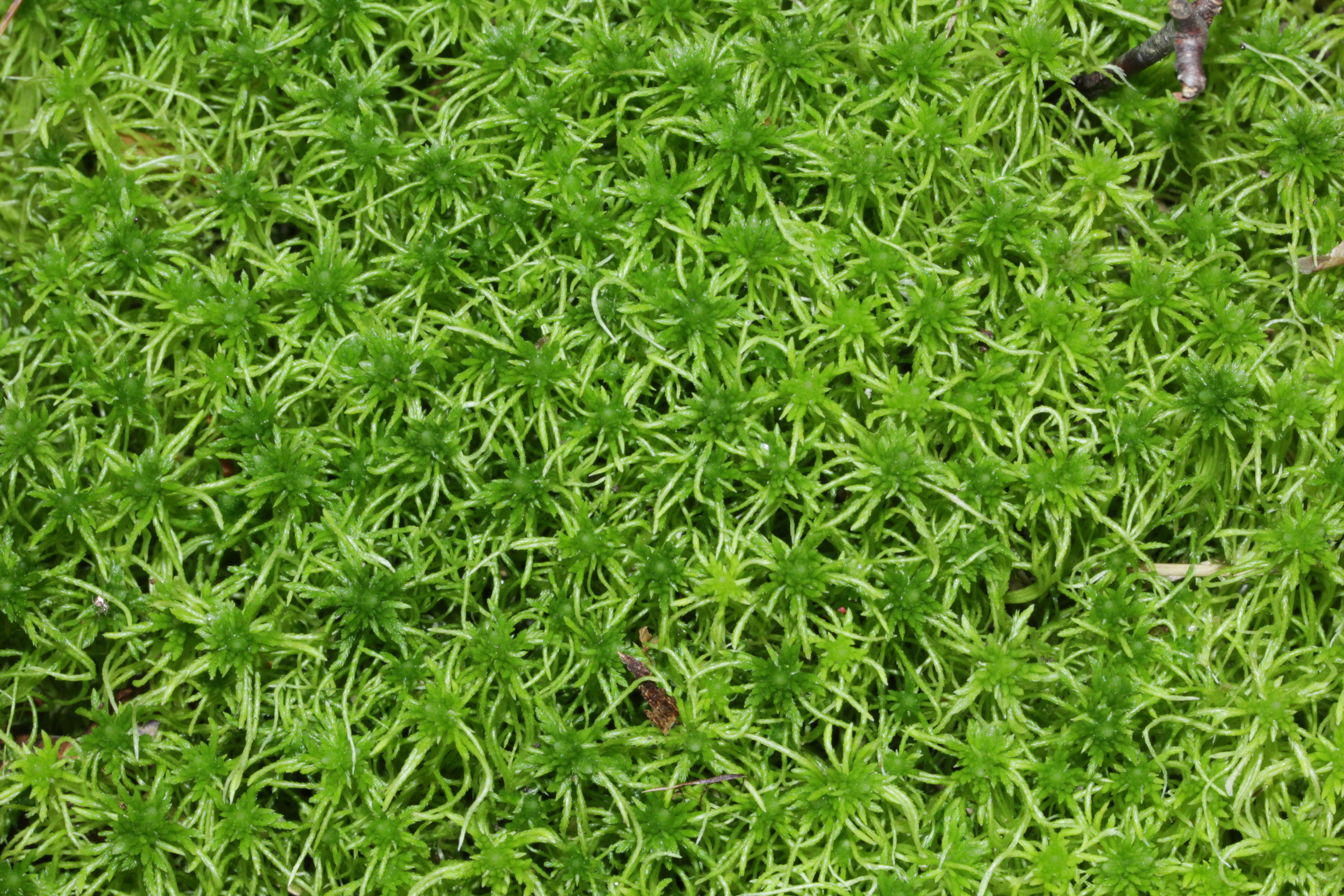
- Sphagnum fimbriatum

Conservation status
- Least Concern (IUCN 3.1)

Scientific classification
- Kingdom: Plantae
- Division: Bryophyta
- Class: Sphagnopsida
- Subclass: Sphagnidae
- Order: Sphagnales
- Family: Sphagnaceae
- Genus: Sphagnum
- Species: S. fimbriatum

Binomial name
- Sphagnum fimbriatum Wilson

Synonyms
- List: Sphagnum acutifolium var. tenue Nees & Hornsch.; Sphagnum bolanderi Warnst.; Sphagnum chilense Lorentz; Sphagnum fimbriatum var. tenue Grav. ex Röll; Sphagnum microphyllum Warnst.; Sphagnum tenue Dozy & Molk.; Sphagnum acutifolium subsp. fimbriatum (Wilson) Hérib.; Sphagnum capillifolium Dozy & Molk.; Sphagnum fimbriatum subsp. fimbriatum; Sphagnum capillifolium var. tenue (Nees & Hornsch.) Steud.; Sphagnum fimbriatum f. compactum (Warnst.) Warnst.; Sphagnum fimbriatum var. densum Röll; Sphagnum fimbriatum var. flagellaceum Schlieph.; Sphagnum fimbriatum var. flagelliforme Warnst.; Sphagnum fimbriatum var. flavescens Warnst.; Sphagnum fimbriatum var. gracilescens Röll; Sphagnum fimbriatum var. heterophyllum Warnst.; Sphagnum fimbriatum var. intermedium Russow; Sphagnum fimbriatum var. intersertum Pichl.; Sphagnum fimbriatum var. intricatum Röll; Sphagnum fimbriatum f. laxum (Braithw.) Wheldon; Sphagnum fimbriatum var. molluscoides Cardot; Sphagnum fimbriatum f. pycnocladum Wheldon; Sphagnum fimbriatum f. rigidum Pichl.; Sphagnum fimbriatum var. robustum Braithw. ex Warnst.; Sphagnum fimbriatum f. spectabile Warnst.; Sphagnum fimbriatum f. squarrosulum Pichl.; Sphagnum fimbriatum f. strictum (Grav. ex Röll) Lange & C.E.O.Jensen; Sphagnum fimbriatum var. submersum Röll; Sphagnum fimbriatum var. trichodes Russow; Sphagnum fimbriatum var. validius Cardot; Sphagnum microphyllum var. bolanderi (Warnst.) Warnst.; Sphagnum squarrosum var. laxum Braithw.; Sphagnum squarrosum var. tenue (Nees & Hornsch.) Bruch; Sphagnum fimbriatum f. compactum Wheldon; Sphagnum fimbriatum var. compactum Warnst.; Sphagnum fimbriatum var. flavescens Warnst. & Cardot; Sphagnum fimbriatum var. laxum (Braithw.) Wijk & Margad.; Sphagnum fimbriatum var. squarrosulum H.Müll. ex Schlieph.; Sphagnum fimbriatum var. strictum Grav. ex Röll; Sphagnum fimbriatum subf. flagelliforme (Warnst.) Warnst.

= Sphagnum fimbriatum =

Species of moss

Sphagnum fimbriatum, the fringed bogmoss, is a peat moss found in temperate regions worldwide, from the Arctic to New Zealand and along the Andes. William Wilson formally described the species in 1846. Plants measure up to 10 cm (4 in) tall, varying from slender to moderately robust forms. It forms loose carpets or soft mounds in wetlands and is identified by its stem leaves with fringed upper margins. The stem leaves distinguish it from other Sphagnum species, including its close relative S. girgensohnii which has rectangular stem leaves fringed only at the tip.

The species grows in various environments but favours damp woodlands and partially shaded wetlands, where it initiates bog formation. It prefers moderately nutrient-rich conditions but tolerates pollutants and saline environments. As a pioneer species, it colonises new or disturbed sites through abundant spore production and effective vegetative reproduction. The species hosts nitrogen-fixing bacteria from the order Rhizobiales, contributing to wetland nutrient cycles. It forms peat deposits and supports wetland succession by modifying soil conditions and facilitating the establishment of other species.

Genetic analyses place S. fimbriatum closer to species in section Squarrosa than its traditional grouping in section Acutifolia. Current populations descended from Atlantic coastal refugia after the last ice age, with genetic evidence supporting classification as a single species despite morphological variation. The species shows higher genetic diversity in southern Europe, particularly along Atlantic coastal regions, while northern populations display greater genetic uniformity. It reproduces primarily through self-fertilisation, which has aided its rapid spread into new territories both historically and in recent decades.

Sphagnum fimbriatum is assessed as a least-concern species across Europe due to its widespread distribution and stable populations, though it faces regional threats. It is classified as critically endangered in Turkey, endangered in Slovenia, and vulnerable in several other European countries. The main threats include wetland drainage, agricultural intensification, and peat extraction. The species serves as a growing medium in horticulture, where it can improve plant growth when mixed with peat. Its bioactive compounds, including caryophyllene and phytol, show potential applications in biotechnology and medicine.

== Taxonomy ==
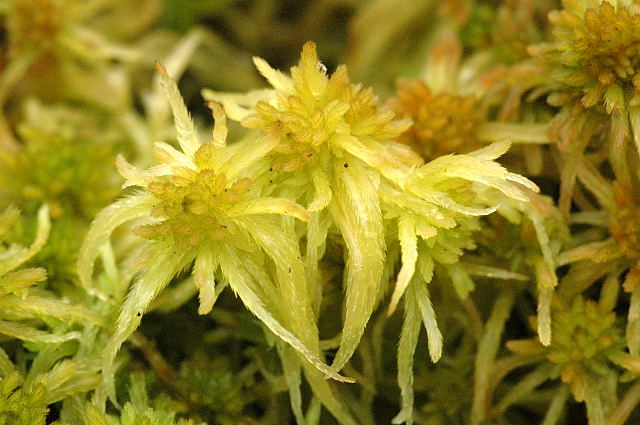
Close-up of stem leaves showing the distinctive fringed (fimbriate) margins that give the species its name

Sphagnum fimbriatum was first formally described by the English bryologist William Wilson in Wilson and Hooker's publication of 1846. Wilson distinguished the species by its slender form and uniquely structured stem leaves. In his description, he emphasised the distinctive network of cells in these leaves, which lack the spiral filaments found in related species. He noted the plant's three to five branches per fascicle, each tapering at the tip, and described its round, very obtuse stem leaves with distinctive fringed edges. The type specimens, collected from Hermite Island, Cape Horn, and the Falkland Islands, were more robust than British material Wilson had examined, though he considered them the same species. Wilson separated S. fimbriatum from S. acutifolium by its more slender habit, distinctive stem leaves, and differently shaped perichaetial leaves (leaves that surround the archegonia), noting also the smaller cell structure at the branch leaf tips.

The species has been known under several synonyms throughout its taxonomic history, including:

- Sphagnum acutifolium Ehrhart 1788 (nom. nud.)
- Sphagnum tenue (Nees & Hornsch.) Dozy 1854
- Sphagnum acutifolium var. tenue Nees von Esenbeck & Hornschuch 1823 (as "Sphagnum tenue")
- Sphagnum capillifolium auct., non (Ehrh.) Hedw. 1782

Although traditionally classified within section Acutifolia, genetic analyses have demonstrated that S. fimbriatum is clearly distinct from other members of this group, sharing only distant relationships with most species in the section. The species shares several morphological features with members of section Squarrosa, including stem bud characteristics, pore distribution patterns, and stem leaf structure. It also shows some ecological similarities with this group. Molecular studies have confirmed this complex taxonomic position, with genetic evidence supporting both its distinctness from most Acutifolia members and its unusual relationship with section Squarrosa. The closest relationship within Acutifolia appears to be with S. girgensohnii, though despite showing evidence of genetic admixture with this species in some populations, the two remain clearly differentiated species based on both morphological and molecular evidence.

=== Subspecies ===
In the Flora of North America series, two subspecies of Sphagnum fimbriatum are recognised:

- S. fimbriatum subsp. fimbriatum – The nominate subspecies is characterised by small and slender plants with small capitula featuring a conspicuous terminal bud, and stem leaves that are fimbriate down the sides with weak to moderate bordering at the base
- S. fimbriatum subsp. concinnum (Berggren) Flatberg & Frisvoll – distinguished by moderate-sized, more compact plants with larger capitula lacking a conspicuous terminal bud, and stem leaves that are entire down the sides with strong bordering at the base

== Description ==
Sphagnum fimbriatum ranges from small and slender to moderately robust in size. The plant lacks metallic lustre when dry, and its colour varies from bright green to yellowish-brown or brown. Individual stems typically reach 80–120 mm (3.1–4.7 in) in length, with plants becoming notably larger and more compact in Arctic regions. When fully developed, individual plants typically reach about 10 cm (4 in) in height. The plant displays small, distinctive head-like structures (capitula) with noticeable protruding stem buds, and its colour varies from bright green to pale yellowish-green. The species characteristically forms either loose carpets or soft raised mounds (sods) in its habitat.

The species shows considerable morphological variation across its range. Plants in southern lowland regions tend to be more slender, with branch leaves typically less than 1.7 mm in length, whilst populations in northern and montane regions display more robust forms. Plants collected from South America, particularly Argentina, tend to be more robust with larger stem leaves than those from similar climatic conditions in the Northern Hemisphere, though they remain morphologically and genetically part of the same species.

=== Stem and branch structure ===
The plant's branches grow in clusters (fascicles) that are moderately spaced along the stem. Each cluster typically contains 4–5 branches of two distinct types (dimorphic): 2–3 branches spread outward while 1–2 hang downward (called pendant branches). The spreading branches appear thin and tapering, quite terete (round in cross-section), measuring between 10–30 mm (0.4–1.2 in) in length, while the pendant branches are long and thin, reaching 25–30 mm (1.0–1.2 in) or more, with a colourless appearance. The branches on the main stem are characteristically thin and elongated, with the capitula at the stem tips often bearing reproductive capsules. The branch stems have a greenish internal cylinder and an outer layer (hyalodermis) with pores present on most cells.

The stem itself is relatively slender, measuring 0.4–0.8 mm (0.02–0.03 in) in diameter (rarely up to 1.0 mm). The stem colour ranges from pale green to straw-coloured. Inside, it has a central cylinder that appears green to brownish-green, made up of thin-walled cells that become smaller and thicker toward the edges. This is surrounded by a well-developed but fragile outer layer (hyalodermis) composed of 2–3 layers of transparent (hyaline) cells. These outer cells typically feature large pores, usually one per cell, with each pore situated in the distal portion of the cell free from the cell wall.

Microscopic characteristics of Sphagnum fimbriatum
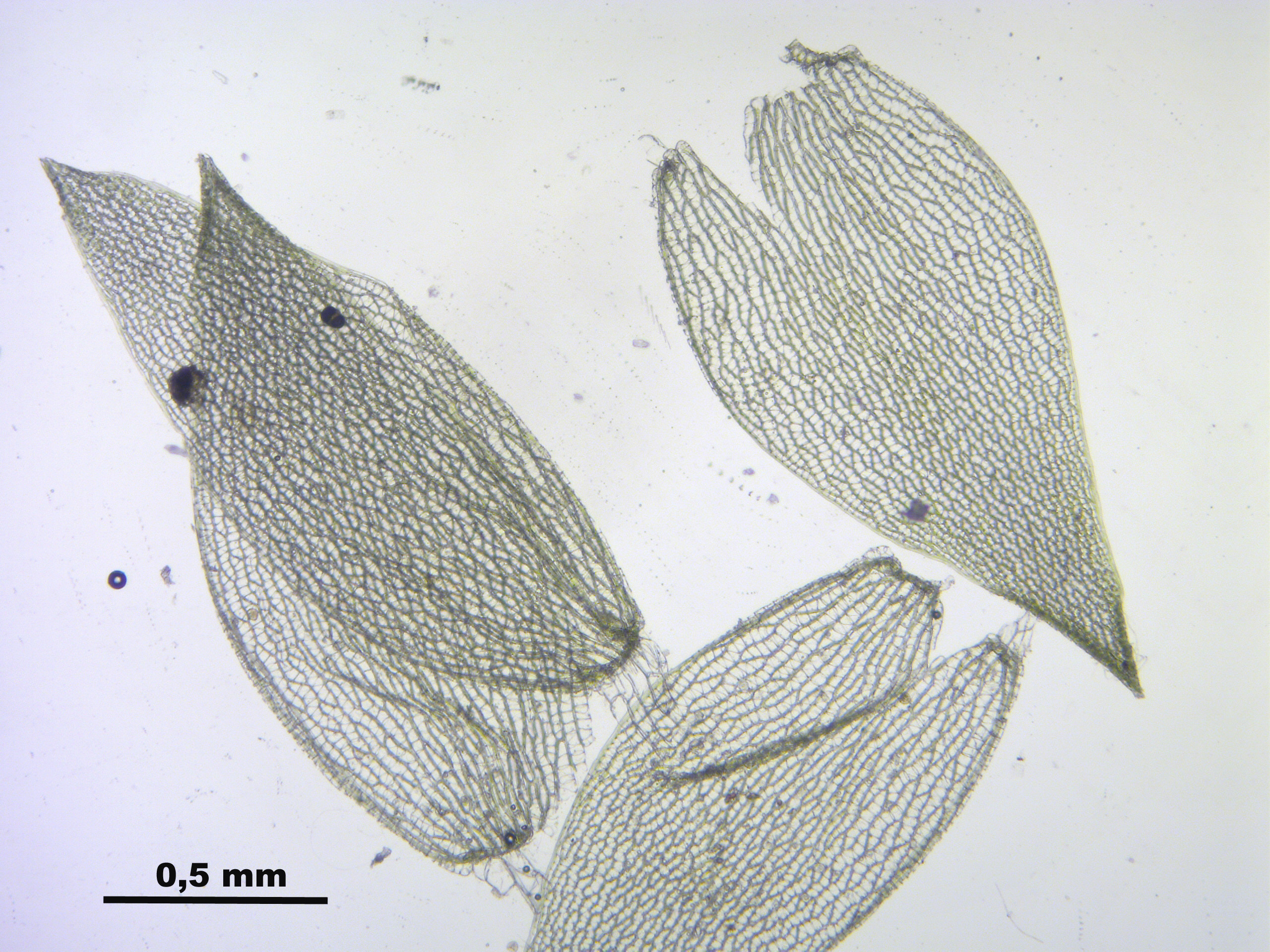
Branch leaves showing cellular network of photosynthetic and hyaline cells.
Scale bar = 0.5 mm

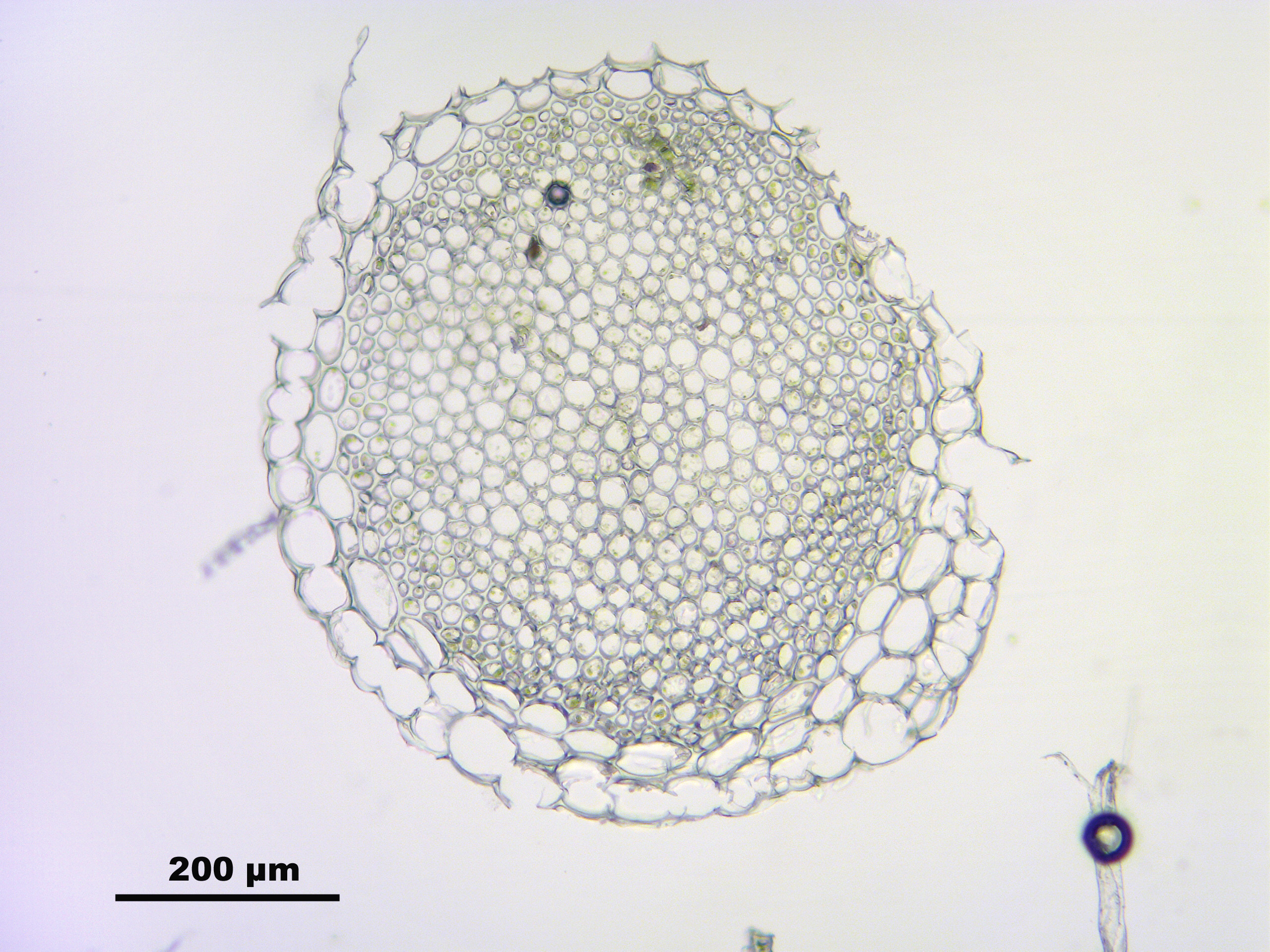
Cross section of a branch showing the central strand surrounded by hyaline cells. Scale bar = 200 μm

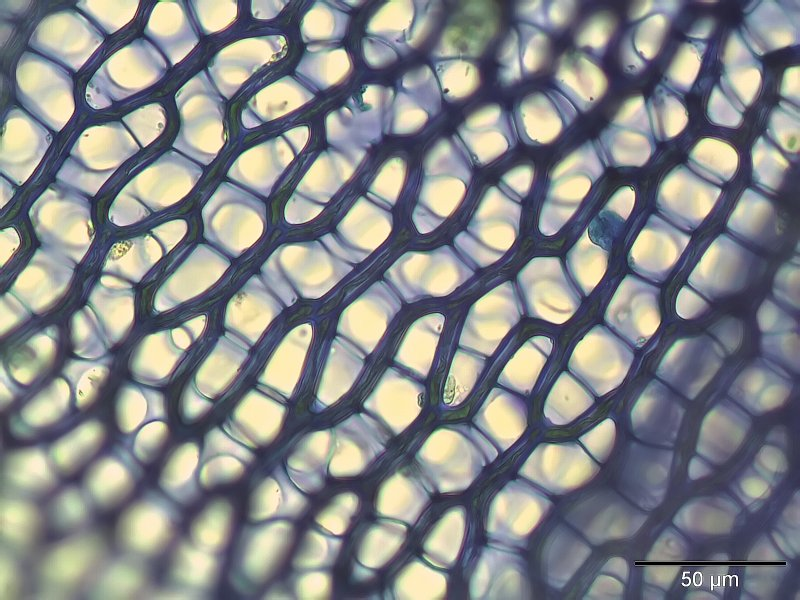
Detail of leaf showing the network of photosynthetic cells (dark) surrounding hyaline cells (light). Scale bar = 50 μm

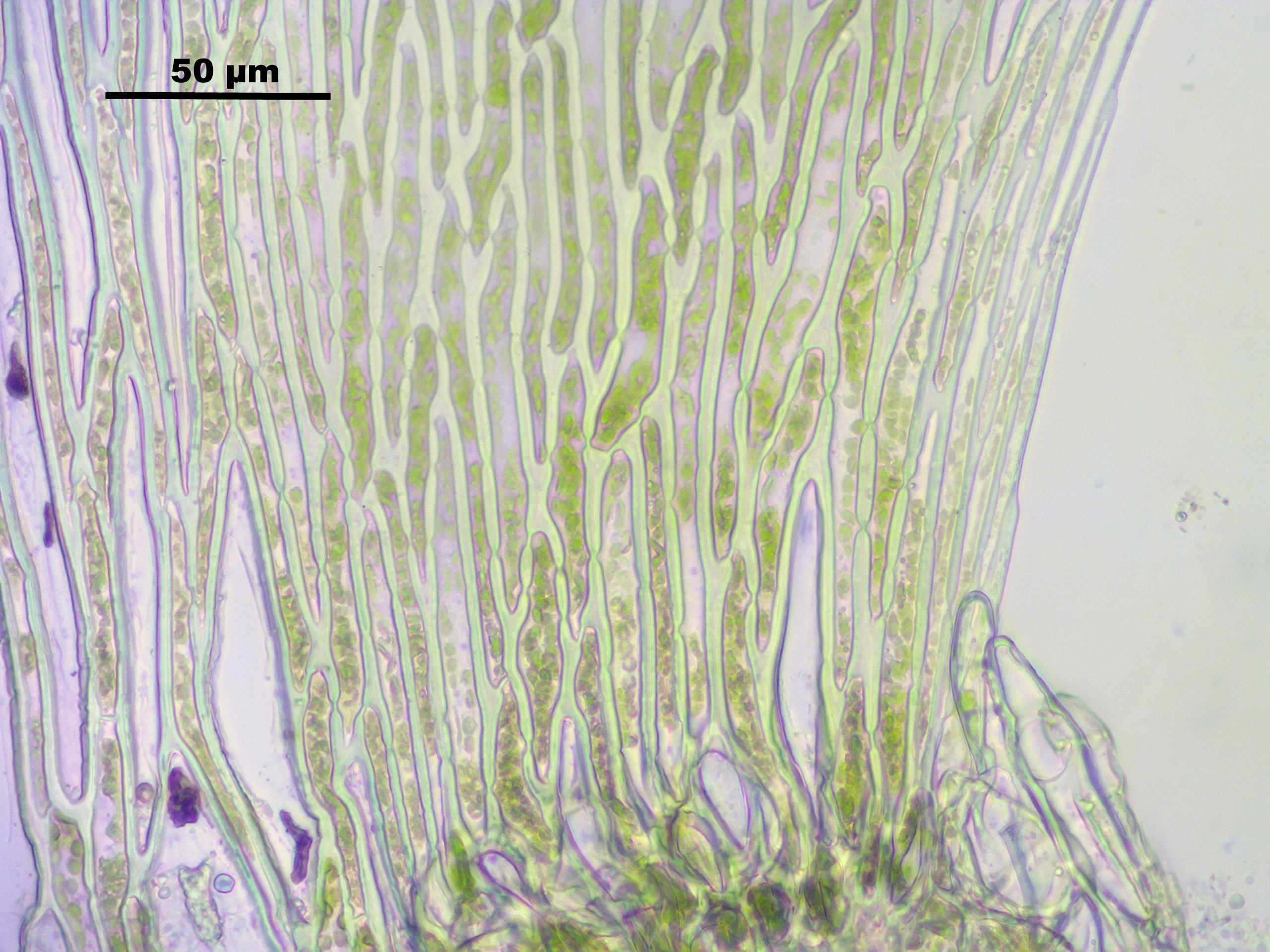
Longitudinal section of a stem showing elongated photosynthetic cells (green) between hyaline cells. Scale bar = 50 μm

=== Leaf characteristics ===
A distinctive feature of S. fimbriatum is its stem leaves, which grow upright and press closely against the stem, forming a leaf sheath. These leaves measure 0.8–2.0 mm in length and have a spatula-like shape that is narrowest near the base. The leaf margins are plane, with a weak border of 2–3 rows of narrow cells restricted to the base. The upper portion of each leaf has a distinctive fringe-like edge (hence the specific epithet 'fimbriatum'). The transparent cells (called hyaline cells) are diamond-shaped (rhomboid), lack the internal strengthening threads (fibrils) found in other parts of the plant, and often contain one or two internal dividing walls (called septa). The leaves consist of a network of green photosynthetic cells interspersed with larger, transparent cells that break down to create a mesh-like structure.

Branch leaves measure 1.1–2.2 mm in length and are arranged irregularly around the branches rather than in distinct rows. Each leaf has a lance-like shape with slightly curved edges and an inrolled tip (involute apex). The leaves' cellular structure shows regular patterns of strengthening fibers and has many small holes (pores) where cells meet (commissures). The pores show a distinctive pattern: on the convex surface, they grade from small near the leaf apex to large at the base, while the concave surface features large round pores at the leaf apex and along the margins. They contain specialised cells for water storage (hyaline cells) that vary in size, being smaller near the tip (60–90 by 15–20 μm) and larger towards the base (up to 170 by 30–40 μm).

The reproductive structures include lateral perichaetia (structures protecting the developing sporophyte) with broad, spatulate, concave leaves that have a truncated, lacerated apex. When present, the spore capsules are short-cylindrical, measuring about 2 mm in length, with a red-brown colouration and convex lid (operculum). The spores measure 20–27 μm in diameter and are finely papillose on both surfaces, with a proximal laesura (splitting line) less than half the spore radius in length.

Chemical analysis has identified 13 distinct phytochemicals in S. fimbriatum, including caryophyllene, phytol, methyl esters of hexadecanoic and heptadecanoic acids, and various phenol derivatives.

== Similar species ==
Sphagnum fimbriatum can be challenging to identify at first glance, as it may be mistaken for other Sphagnum species, particularly stunted forms of S. recurvum. However, several distinctive features aid in its identification. A key characteristic is its hard, conical stem bud, a feature shared only with S. teres and S. squarrosum. These species can be distinguished by their habitat preferences and morphological differences: S. teres typically grows in more nutrient-rich environments and has a dark brown stem, whilst S. squarrosum is generally more robust and features distinctively spreading branch leaves.

The most reliable identifying feature of S. fimbriatum is its unique stem leaves, which have a distinctive fringe around their upper edges. This characteristic is best observed by removing the head-like capitulum and examining the projecting fringe at the broken stem end. Whilst the northern species S. lindbergii has somewhat similar stem leaves, it is sufficiently different in other aspects to prevent confusion. S. girgensohnii, another similar species, can be distinguished by its more rectangular stem leaves, which are fringed only across the tip rather than around the entire upper portion.

== Habitat ==
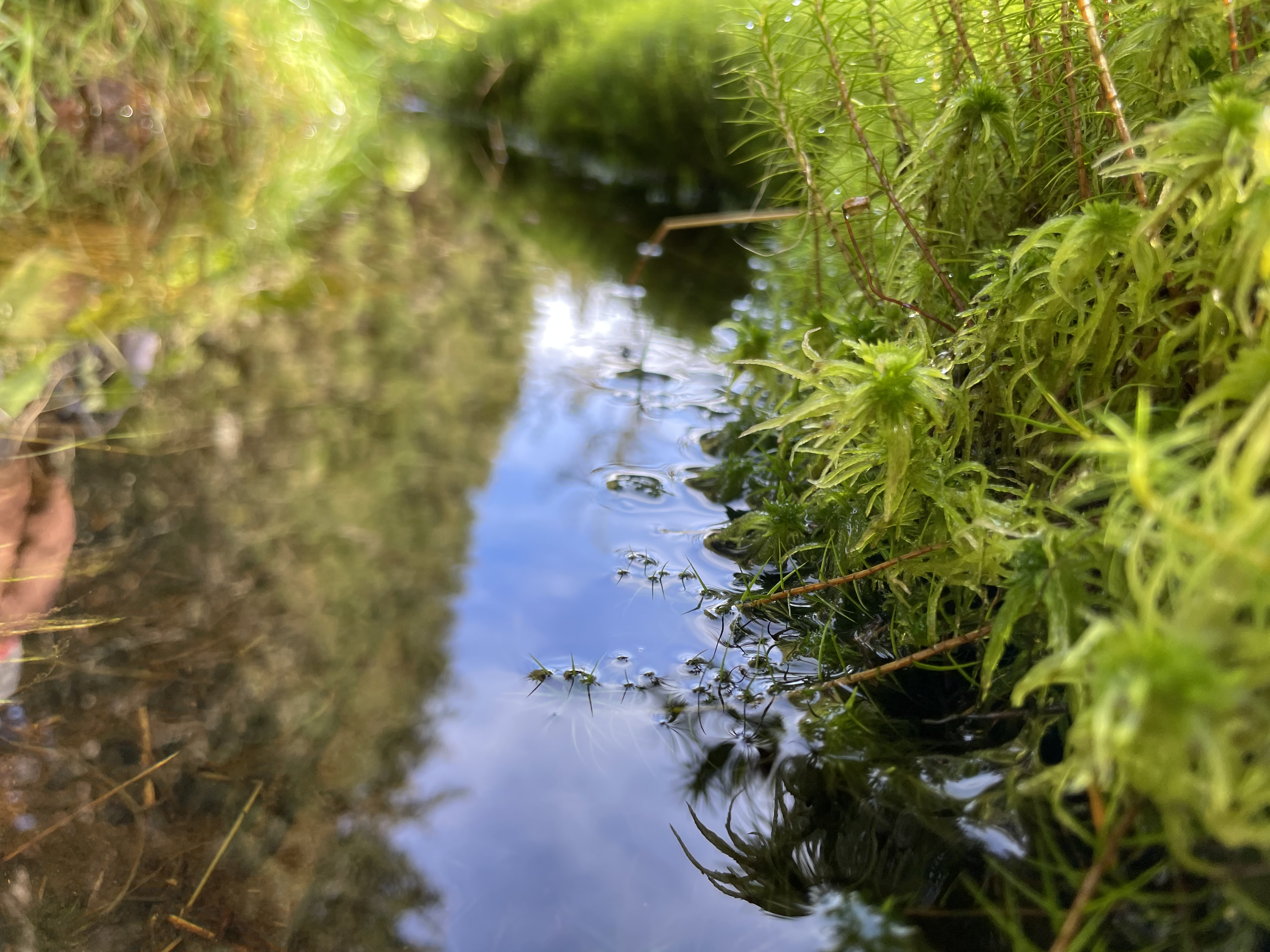
Sphagnum fimbriatum growing at the edge of a woodland stream in Šumava, Czech Republic

Sphagnum fimbriatum typically grows in moderately nutrient-rich (mesotrophic) wetland environments, where it forms soft, raised mounds (hummocks) or loose carpets in partially shaded conditions. The species is particularly characteristic of young wetland stages in succession, being among the first Sphagnum species to colonise new sites. These early successional habitats typically have thin peat layers and fluctuating hydrological conditions, making them more sensitive to weather variations than established peatlands with thicker peat accumulation.

The species shows a particular preference for damp woodland habitats, especially those dominated by willow (Salix) or birch (Betula) trees, often growing alongside purple moor-grass (Molinia). It can also thrive in more exposed locations, such as along grassy stream banks, drainage ditches, lake edges, and in nutrient-balanced fenland communities. The species is particularly effective at colonising bare soil surfaces, including disturbed habitats, and shows a distinct preference for establishing itself in sites with low phosphate content.

Whilst S. fimbriatum commonly grows in pure stands, it may also be found growing alongside other bog-moss species. Common associates include the blunt-leaved bog-moss (S. palustre), spreading-leaved bog-moss (S. squarrosum), and fine bog-moss (S. angustifolium). In northern regions, it can be found intermixed with Lindberg's bog-moss (S. lindbergii) or streamside bog-moss (S. riparium). In some locations, such as the Selište peatlands of Serbia, it grows in mixed communities with S. palustre, S. inundatum, S. fallax and S. flexuosum.

== Distribution ==
Sphagnum fimbriatum occurs across temperate regions of the Northern Hemisphere and extends into the Arctic. In the Southern Hemisphere, it grows along the Andes from northern South America to subantarctic regions. The species grows in New Zealand and South Africa, occurring from sea level to 1,270 m (4,170 ft) elevation. Among Sphagnum species, only S. magellanicum shares a similar geographical range.

In North America, its range extends from the Arctic southward to West Virginia, Ohio, Indiana, Illinois, Iowa, and South Dakota, with western populations in Colorado, Idaho, and California. It grows most commonly at bog edges with mineral soil and in open to wooded fens with low to medium nutrient levels. In Europe, S. fimbriatum occurs throughout the continent but predominates in lowland areas. The species is present throughout much of Central and Eastern Europe, including Bosnia and Herzegovina, Croatia, Bulgaria, Romania, and Hungary. In Serbia, it was first discovered in 1953 on Mt. Ostrozub, though this record was not confirmed until 2016. It is absent from Macaronesia and many Mediterranean countries.

Sphagnum fimbriatum has spread to new areas across Europe in recent decades. This spread reflects its pioneer characteristics and reproductive success, patterns also seen in its post-glacial colonisation. In the British Isles, the species is widespread and generally common, though it occurs less frequently in central southern England, north-western Scotland, and western Ireland.

In South Africa, the species' distribution reflects a possible historical introduction pathway. While initially reported from George in the Cape region, subsequent examination of herbarium specimens indicated the species was actually collected from Belfast in the Transvaal region. Its presence may have resulted from early 20th-century European trout introductions, which could have transported spores or plant fragments.

== Genetics and phylogeography ==
Molecular studies show S. fimbriatum contains more genetic diversity than its close relatives. Despite considerable morphological variation across its range, genetic evidence supports treating it as a single species.

=== Post-glacial colonisation ===
Chloroplast DNA analysis shows how S. fimbriatum colonised Europe after the last ice age. The species survived the Last Glacial Maximum along Europe's Atlantic coast, developing two main genetic lineages: one along the coasts of Spain, France, and Britain, another spreading to central and northern Europe. Higher genetic diversity in Atlantic coastal regions indicates these areas served as glacial refugia.

A single genetic type dominates continental Europe, suggesting the species passed through a population bottleneck during glaciation before expanding rapidly. The species recolonised Northern Europe rapidly following glaciation, with genetic evidence suggesting rapid expansion. This expansion continues in the present day, with S. fimbriatum showing significant increases in occurrence across Central and Northern Europe in recent decades, linked to particular genetic lineages that have proven especially effective at northern colonization.

=== Genetic adaptation and variation ===
The haploid-dominant life cycle of S. fimbriatum exposes genetic variations directly to natural selection, without masking by dominant alleles. However, the species' high dispersal ability through spores may counteract local adaptation by continuously redistributing genetic variability across populations. Northern populations show less genetic diversity than southern ones. Certain genes, such as GapC (encoding glyceraldehyde 3-phosphate dehydrogenase), show evidence of molecular adaptation, suggesting selective pressures contribute to the species' success in different environments.

While populations from South America, particularly Argentina, show some genetic and morphological differentiation from Northern Hemisphere populations, the differences are not sufficient to warrant taxonomic separation. These southern populations exhibit some unique genetic markers but remain within the range of variation seen across the species as a whole. The species shows evidence of past interbreeding (hybridisation) with another moss species, S. girgensohnii, particularly in northern populations. However, both continue to exist as separate, distinct species despite this historical mixing. This genetic admixture may help explain some of the morphological variation observed in the field, especially in areas where both species occur together.

=== Contemporary distribution and gene flow ===
Microsatellite studies indicate regular genetic exchange between populations through spore dispersal. This genetic connectivity helps explain how the species has maintained coherence across its extensive global distribution, despite showing local adaptation to different environmental conditions. The patterns seen in its genetic makeup suggest that S. fimbriatum mostly reproduces by fertilising itself rather than cross-breeding with other plants. This ability to self-fertilise may have helped it spread quickly after the last ice age. This reproductive strategy, combined with effective spore dispersal, helps explain the species' success in colonising new territories despite potential genetic bottlenecks.

The same colonisation mechanisms that enabled post-glacial spread support current range expansion in Europe. The species' successful colonisation of new areas in recent decades follows a similar pattern to its post-glacial expansion, suggesting its recent spread represents a natural response to changing environmental conditions rather than a novel behaviour.

== Ecology ==
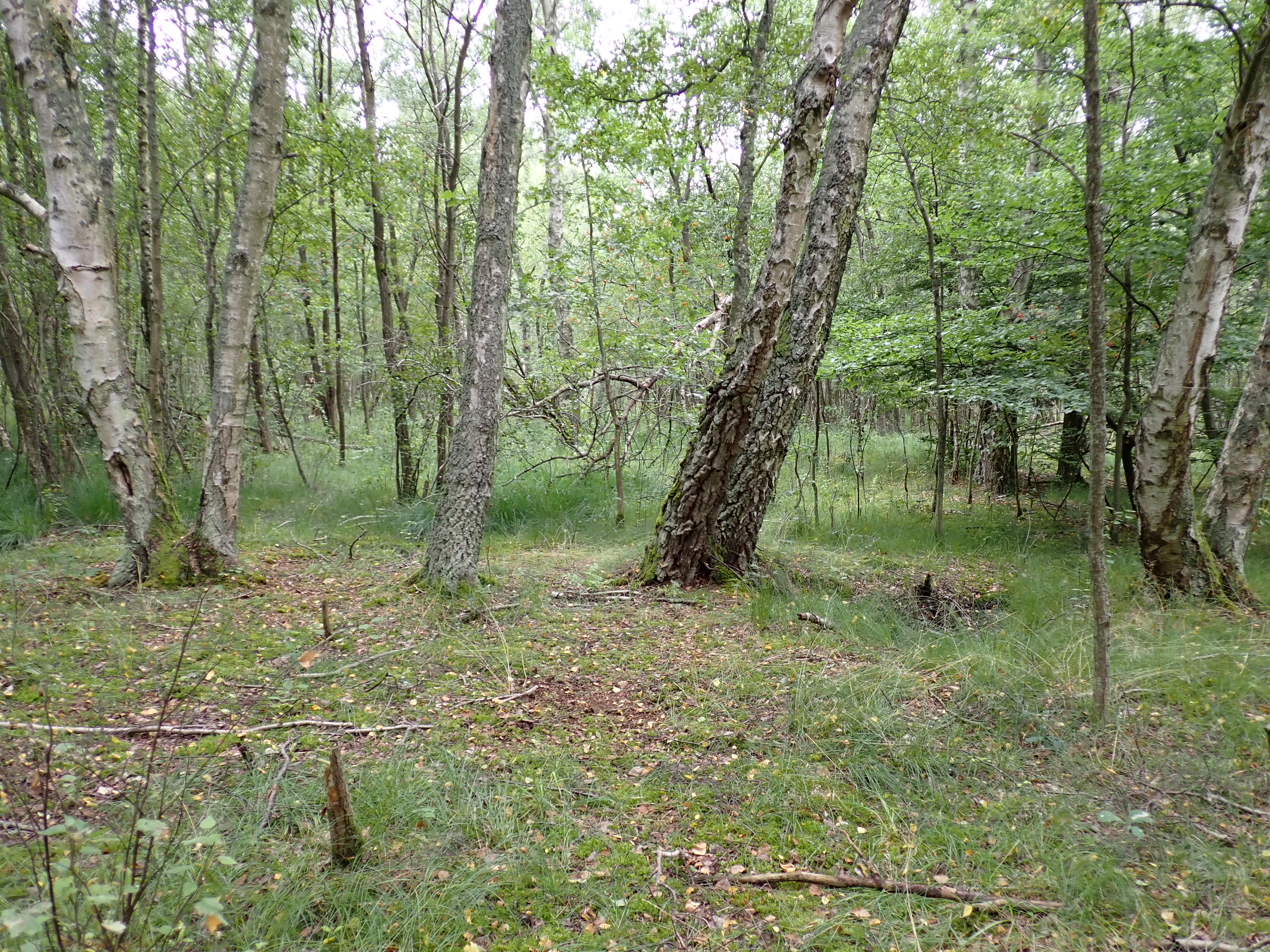
Birch-dominated woodland in Mrzeżyno, Poland, typical habitat of Sphagnum fimbriatum

Sphagnum fimbriatum colonises wetland habitats as a pioneer species. It grows in moderately calcareous waters and tolerates pollutants, including heavy metals and salt levels up to 300 milligrammes per litre of chloride. S. fimbriatum often grows in nutrient-rich (minerotrophic) conditions uncommon for Sphagnum species. When grown under forest canopies or in minerotrophic rich fens, it shows relatively low productivity compared to other Sphagnum species, which may reflect suboptimal growth conditions such as low light, constrained water availability, or high pH in these habitats. Success in its pioneer role appears linked to specific genetic adaptations that improve its colonisation ability, competitive capacity, and vegetative growth, particularly in northern regions.

In temperate regions, S. fimbriatum is typically found in the shade of Betula spp. and Salix spp. in fen carr, in flushed zones in woodland, or in the central zone of valley mires, where water pH may range from 6–7 and calcium concentrations reach around 1 milliequivalent per litre. Unlike other Sphagnum species, S. fimbriatum tolerates higher pH and calcium levels, though combined high levels of both reduce growth. However, the combination of both high pH and high calcium concentration can significantly reduce its growth. Annual biomass production in this species is typically lower than in many other Sphagnum species, ranging from approximately 50–250 grams of dry mass per square metre per year. This relatively low productivity is characteristic of Sphagnum species that grow in shaded, forested habitats. Plants in shade or high water become elongated with less biomass. When submerged, its stems become weaker, with capitula often settling and floating at the water surface with stems bending below.

The species shows relatively low desiccation tolerance compared to other Sphagnum species, with shoots potentially dying after just three days of mild desiccation. This vulnerability reflects its adaptation to young wetland habitats that lack thick peat layers and have variable water conditions. These early-succession sites typically have lower water-holding capacity and are more sensitive to weather fluctuations than established peatlands. A high and stable water level is the most decisive factor for S. fimbriatum's growth, while nutrient availability has only minor effects on its development. S. fimbriatum grows fastest at 25°C, three times the rate at 15°C. While the species grows best in bright light conditions, it maintains effective chlorophyll production even in dim light. Unlike many other Sphagnum mosses, which can develop red or brown protective pigments (called anthocyanins), S. fimbriatum stays bright green because it lacks these protective compounds.

After harvesting, new capitula can cover 80% of cleared areas within twelve months. The species' success as a pioneer is supported by several adaptations: high photosynthetic capacity, rapid growth rate (particularly during summer months), and relatively quick decomposition compared to other Sphagnum species. However, despite being an effective coloniser, S. fimbriatum is not a strong competitor once established and can be displaced by other species better adapted to stable conditions in later succession stages. This ecological strategy helps explain both its historical patterns of post-glacial colonisation and its current distribution patterns.

Growth measurements show that S. fimbriatum has higher metabolic rates compared to later successional Sphagnum species, though measurements of its photosystem II efficiency indicate it experiences some physiological stress in its variable habitat. These characteristics align with its role as an early coloniser in wetland succession.

The moss hosts nitrogen-fixing bacteria (diazotrophs). Most of these bacteria belong to a group called Alphaproteobacteria, particularly the order Rhizobiales, while only about 6% are blue-green bacteria (cyanobacteria). Water levels affect nitrogen fixation rates, with submerged plants showing higher rates than emergent ones. Plants growing underwater show much higher rates of nitrogen conversion compared to those growing above water. A study found that nitrogen fixation in S. fimbriatum is largely unaffected by the specific composition of its diazotrophic bacterial community, which is predominantly composed of bacteria from the Rhizobiales order within Alphaproteobacteria. Methane availability does not appear to influence nitrogen fixation rates in S. fimbriatum, suggesting that water level and habitat type are the primary drivers of nitrogen fixation in this species. These bacterial communities show considerable variation between different habitats but maintain similar composition within the same site.

In Hungarian peatlands, S. fimbriatum characterises early succession in grey willow wetlands (Salici cinereae–Sphagnetum recurvi). Within this community, S. fimbriatum commonly co-occurs with Sphagnum squarrosum in nutrient-rich areas and contributes to the developing peat layer. As succession progresses, other Sphagnum species like S. fallax and S. palustre often become more dominant, supporting the gradual formation of bogs in continental climates.

== Reproduction ==
Sphagnum fimbriatum reproduces successfully through both sexual and vegetative means, aiding its spread as a pioneer species. The species produces more abundant sporophytes than any other Sphagnum species and regenerates effectively through vegetative growth.

=== Sexual reproduction and spore dispersal ===
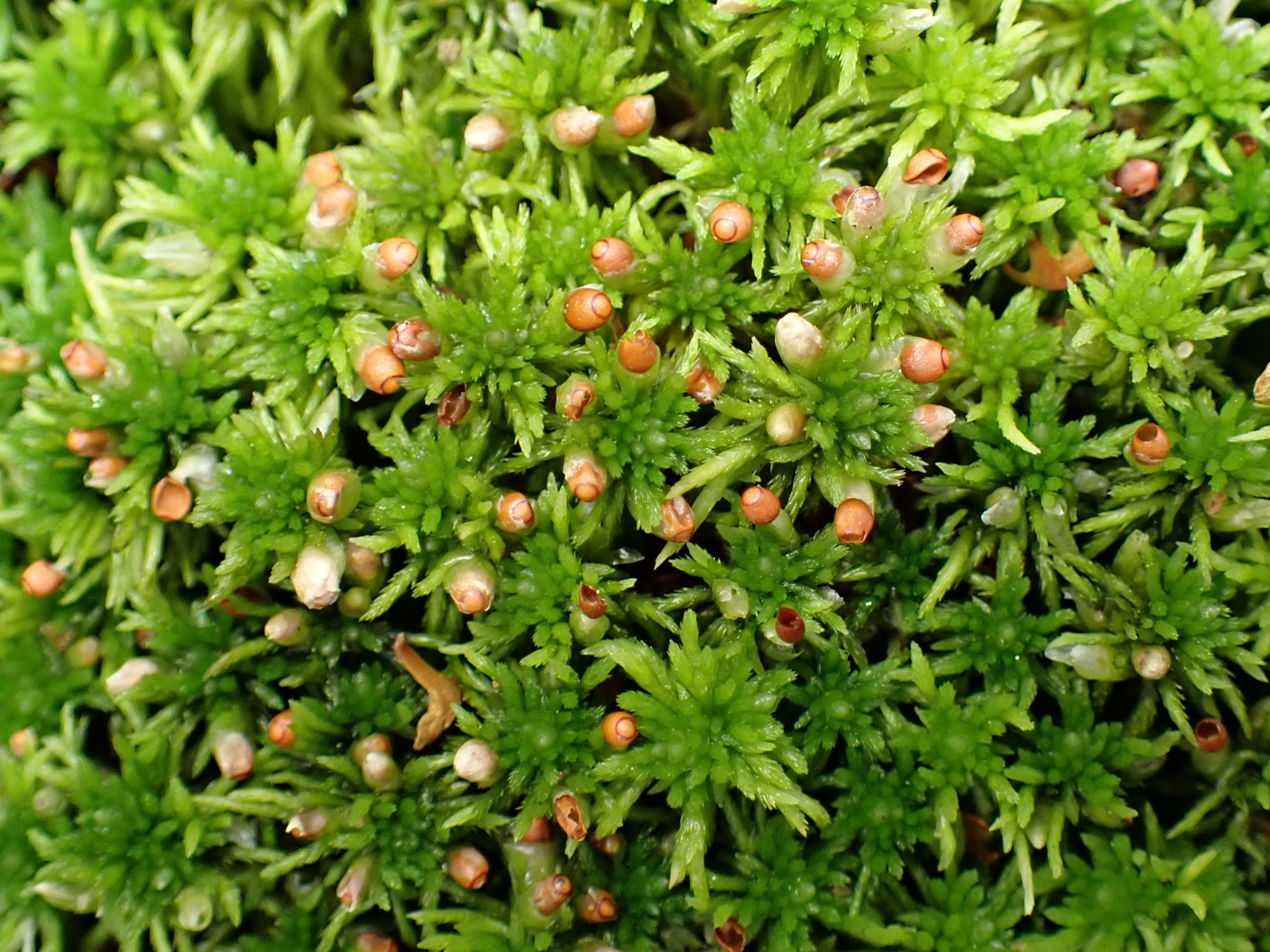
Mature spore capsules on Sphagnum fimbriatum, showing the species' prolific spore production

Sphagnum fimbriatum is monoecious, with male and female structures on the same plant. The reproductive cycle in temperate regions follows seasonal patterns: it begins in late summer with the development of male reproductive structures (antheridia) that form in the angles between leaves near the branch tips. The female reproductive structures (archegonia) begin developing in September. The protective leaves around female structures (archegonial bracts) are larger than normal branch leaves. The leaves that later develop around the developing spore capsule (perichaetial leaves) have fewer internal strengthening threads in their transparent cells compared to the archegonial bracts. These perichaetial leaves surround and protect both the archegonia and young sporophyte throughout their development. Mature antheridia have a single-layer jacket around androgonial cells, on stalks that develop before the main structure. The species typically produces fewer archegonia per branch compared to other Sphagnum species, particularly members of section Squarrosa which may produce up to five.

Fertilisation typically occurs in March, following sperm release during February's first temperature increases. After fertilisation, the developing plant embryo first grows within the protective base of the female structure (called the archegonial venter) before moving into the tip of the branch. Spore development continues through spring, with the distinctive black spore capsules maturing in early July. The smooth spores measure 24–27 μm in diameter and are produced in greater abundance than in other Sphagnum species.

The species releases spores through an 'air-gun' mechanism, launching them 15 cm (5.9 in) high at speeds up to 3.6 m (12 ft) per second (about 8 miles per hour). This mechanism, combined with the spores' slow settling speed, enables effective wind dispersal over long distances. When the spores land, they can start growing immediately. They first develop into a flat, single-layer-thick structure (called a protonema) that produces tiny root-like filaments (rhizoids) to attach to the growing surface. Usually, a single gametophyte develops from each protonema.

Molecular evidence suggests that S. fimbriatum predominantly reproduces through self-fertilisation, a strategy that may have aided its rapid post-glacial spread by allowing single spores to establish new populations. Though rarely observed in the field, wind-dispersed spores enable colonisation of distant sites.

=== Vegetative growth and regeneration ===
Sphagnum fimbriatum reproduces vegetatively more effectively than other Sphagnum mosses. It produces new shoots (innovations) from both branch clusters (fascicles) and stem tips (capitula) more readily than other bog mosses. This vegetative reproduction ability persists even under moderately saline conditions, with the species capable of producing new growth in environments with chloride concentrations up to 500 mg/L.

The species regenerates quickly after disturbance. Studies of harvested sites have shown that new capitula can cover up to 80% of disturbed areas within twelve months. This rapid regeneration ability, combined with its prolific spore production, helps explain the species' success as a pioneer coloniser. While spore dispersal enables long-distance colonisation, vegetative reproduction becomes the dominant means of local population expansion once the species is established in a new location.

Both vegetative reproduction and spore production contribute to colonisation success. This approach has proven particularly successful in both historical post-glacial expansion and contemporary spread into new territories. The species' relatively low desiccation tolerance, with shoots potentially dying after just three days of mild desiccation, is offset by its rapid growth rate and strong regenerative capabilities when conditions are favourable.

== Conservation ==
The International Union for Conservation of Nature lists Sphagnum fimbriatum as a least-concern species (LC) in Europe. This assessment reflects the species' widespread distribution, stable populations, and successful colonisation of new habitats, despite regional pressures. Its range and occupied area remain above threatened status thresholds.

The conservation status of S. fimbriatum differs across Europe. It is classified as Endangered in Slovenia, Vulnerable in Slovakia, Switzerland, and Austria, Near Threatened in Hungary, and Data Deficient in Bulgaria. Like all Sphagnum species, it receives protection under Annex V of the European Union Habitats Directive. In Switzerland, the species benefits from specific protection under the Ordinance on the Protection of Nature and Cultural Heritage, with most of its peat bog habitats being nationally protected. In Turkey, the species is listed as Critically Endangered, with its main habitat at Ciğer Lake Peatland declining through habitat loss. Conservation strategies proposed for Turkish Sphagnum species emphasise protecting rare peatlands to mitigate ongoing habitat degradation.

Sphagnum fimbriatum faces the same threats as other European wetland species: habitat drainage for agriculture, nutrient pollution from farming, dam construction, and peat extraction. The species shows more resilience than other bog-mosses through effective spore dispersal and colonisation. As a good pioneer species, it regularly produces spores, enabling it to establish new populations in suitable habitats relatively quickly, although it is not a strong competitor and can be displaced by other species during habitat succession.

Sphagnum fimbriatum populations remain stable or are increasing in most areas, with declining populations often recovering through spore dispersal and colonisation. Its adaptation to secondary habitats, including drainage ditches, helps maintain population stability despite habitat loss.

== Uses ==
=== Horticultural applications ===
Like other Sphagnum species, S. fimbriatum can be used both as a decorative ornamental plant and as a growing substrate for other species in horticulture. When used as a growing medium, it can be employed either pure or mixed with peat. Studies have shown that while it performs well for growing some ornamental plants like Tagetes (marigolds), it may inhibit seed germination in certain species. When mixed with peat in proportions up to 75%, it can actually improve plant growth compared to pure peat substrates. The species shows distinct chemical properties from other Sphagnum mosses when used as a growing medium, containing notably higher levels of soluble potassium. However, these chemical differences can lead to chlorosis (yellowing of leaves) in some plants grown in pure S. fimbriatum substrate, suggesting its optimal use may be as part of a mixed growing medium rather than alone.

The species has gained increasing attention as a potential sustainable alternative to traditional peat in horticultural growing media. Under cultivation, S. fimbriatum and other Sphagnum species typically achieve annual yields of 3–6 tonnes of dry mass per hectare.

=== Research and biotechnology ===
The species can be successfully cultivated in vitro from sterilised spores, making it suitable for establishing axenic laboratory cultures. When grown in sterile conditions, spores germinate within 1–2 weeks to form filamentous and thalloid protonema, from which gametophores later develop. These cultures maintain their ability to grow and can be used for both research and possible mass production purposes. The establishment of such sterile in vitro cultures is particularly valuable given that many Sphagnum species, including S. fimbriatum, are protected by law in several European countries. The species can be maintained long-term in tissue culture, allowing the production of uncontaminated material for research and biotechnology applications.

Chemical analysis has revealed that S. fimbriatum contains several secondary metabolites, some with biological activity. These include caryophyllene, which has demonstrated antiviral, anti-inflammatory and antimicrobial properties, and phytol, which shows antiviral, antimicrobial, and anti-inflammatory activities. The presence of oleic acid derivatives suggests potential moderate antiviral effects.

== See also ==
- List of Sphagnum species
