= William Wilson (botanist) =

English botanist and bryologist (1799–1871)

- Born: June 7, 1799; Warrington, Lancashire, England
- Died: April 3, 1871 (aged 71); Paddington, Warrington, England
- Resting place: Hill Cliff nonconformist burial-ground, Warrington
- Known for: Bryologia Britannica (1855); Discovery of Cotoneaster cambricus; Hymenophyllum wilsonii
- Scientific career
- Fields: Botany, Bryology
- Author abbrev. (botany): Wilson

William M. Wilson (1799–1871) was an English botanist, known for his focus on bryology.

== Life ==
The second son of Thomas Wilson, a druggist, he was born at Warrington (which was then in Lancashire, and later transferred to Cheshire) on 7 June 1799. He was educated at Prestbury Grammar School and under Dr John Reynolds at the dissenting academy in Leaf Square, Manchester. He was then articled to a firm of solicitors in Manchester; but fell ill. This led to his love of botany, and when he was about 25, his mother gave him an allowance so that he could devote himself entirely to it.

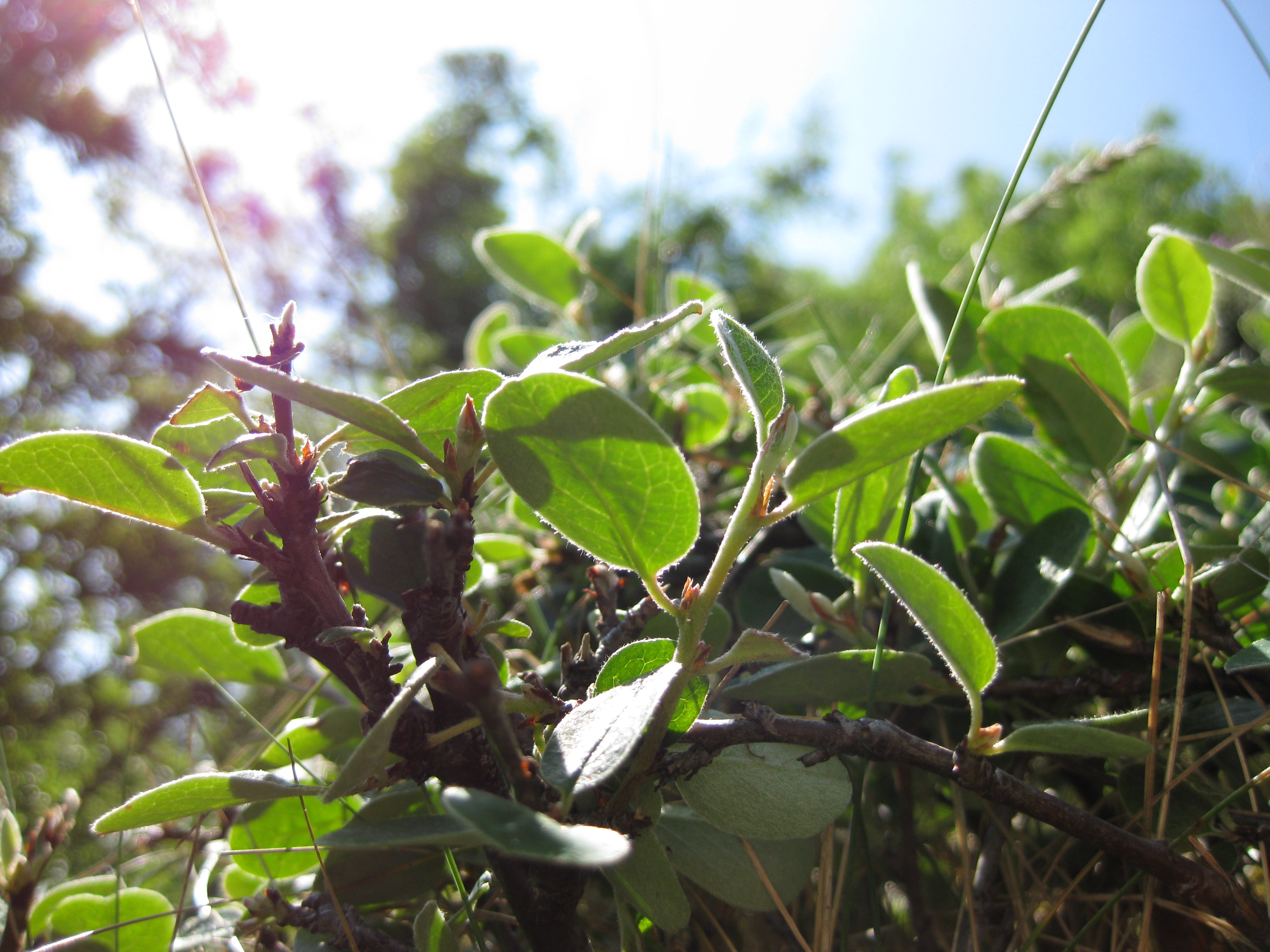
Cotoneaster cambricus

In 1821 Wilson discovered Cotoneaster cambricus on Great Orme's Head. It brought him into correspondence with Sir James Edward Smith, who encouraged him. In 1827 John Stevens Henslow introduced him to William Jackson Hooker.

Wilson spent nearly two years in Ireland, where he studied mosses, which from 1830 took his whole attention. From 1829 onward he was frequently quoted in Hooker's British Flora. He became well known in his field.

== Death ==
Wilson died at Paddington, two miles from Warrington, on 3 April 1871, and was buried in the nonconformist burial-ground, Hill Cliff, Warrington. He had married in 1836 a widowed cousin, Eliza Lane.

== Works ==
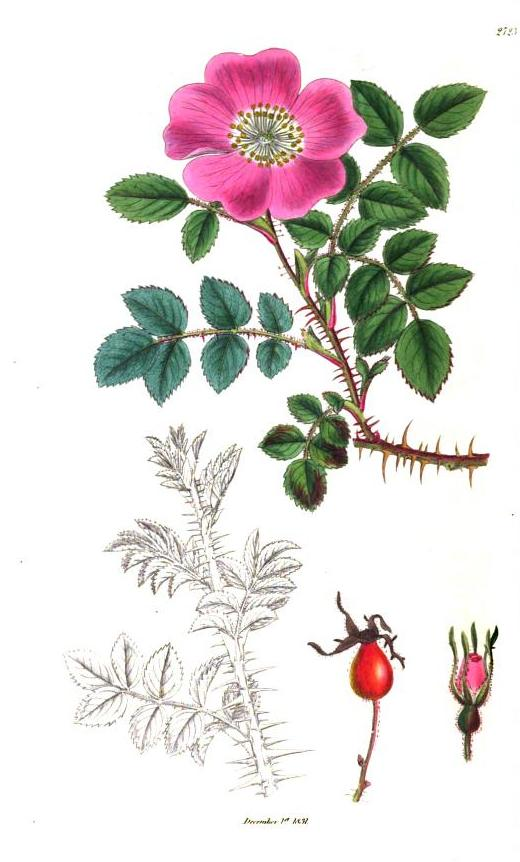
Rosa Wilsoni

Wilson was entrusted with the description of the mosses collected in the voyages of HMS Erebus and HMS Terror under James Clark Ross (expedition to Antarctica from 1839 to 1843), and of HMS Herald under Henry Kellett. He made an early account of Tasmanian mosses, describing many novelties.

Wilson entered into correspondence with specialists: Sextus Otto Lindberg and Wilhelm Philippe Schimper. His major work was the Bryologia Britannica (1855) intended as a third edition of the Muscologia Britannica (1818) of Hooker and Thomas Taylor, but was substantially a new work. Over a hundred new species of British mosses were then added to the list between its publication and his death.

Besides the Cotoneaster, Wilson added a new species of rose, a fern, and many mosses to the British list, the rose Rosa Wilsoni being named after him by William Borrer, and the Wilson's filmy fern named Hymenophyllum wilsonii by Hooker. Wilson described many new species of exotic mosses in the Journal of Botany. His papers were enumerated in the Royal Society's Catalogue (vi. 389, viii. 1249), and his herbarium and botanical correspondence went to the Natural History Museum.

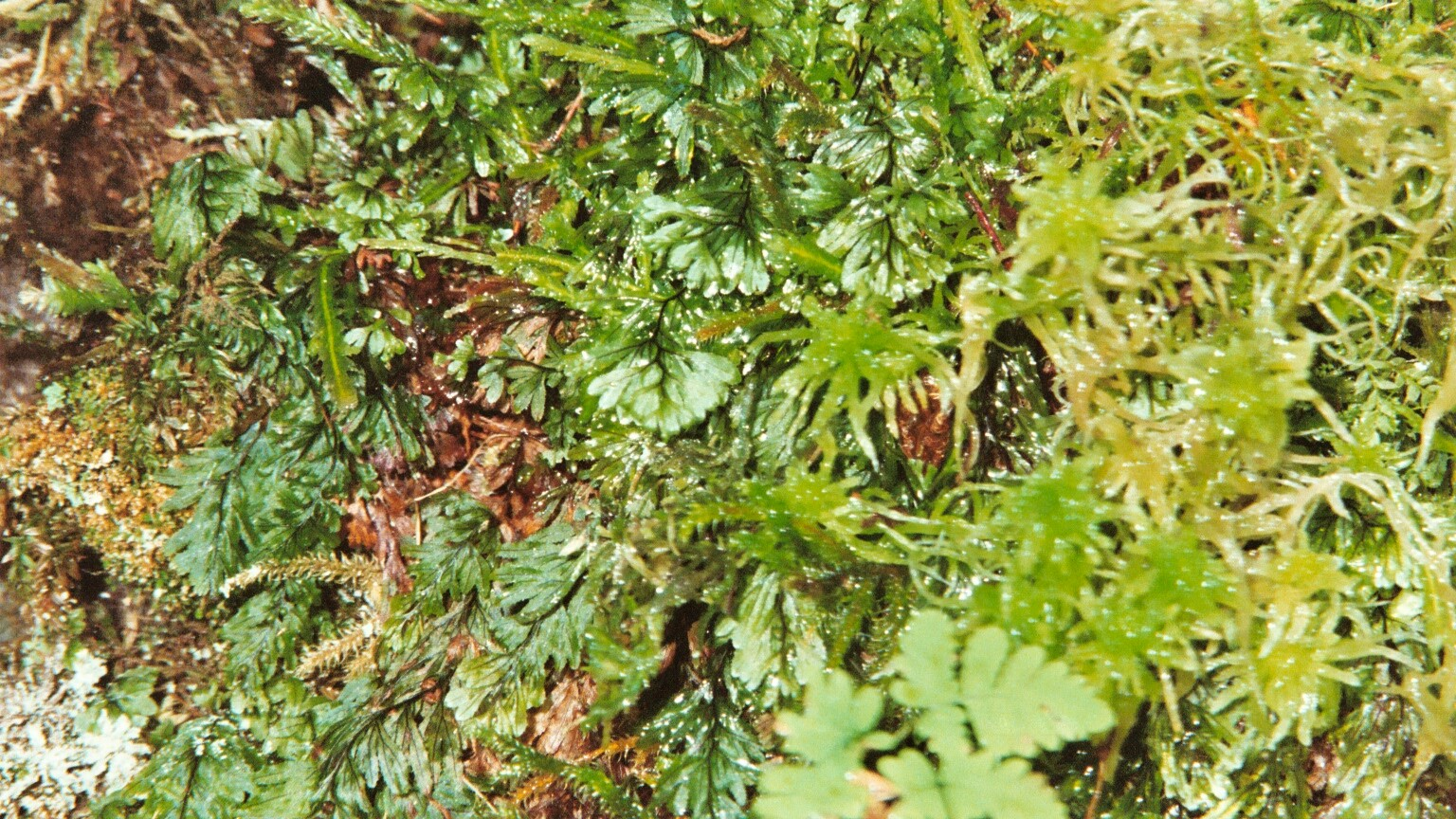
Hymenophyllum wilsonii, growing on Godøy in Norway

With William Jackson Hooker Wilson edited the exsiccata series Musci Americani; or, specimens of mosses, Jungermanniae, &c. collected by the late Thomas Drummond, in the Southern States of North America. Arranged and named by W. Wilson and Sir W. J. Hooker (1841) with bryophyte specimens of the plant collector Thomas Drummond. Later on he issued the exsiccata Musci Britannici (1855).

== See also ==
- Category:Taxa named by William Wilson (botanist)
