= Mesotrophic soil =

Soil type

Mesotrophic soils are soils with a moderate inherent fertility compared to eutrophic and oligotrophic soils. An indicator of soil fertility is its base status, which is expressed as a ratio relating the major nutrient cations (calcium, magnesium, potassium and sodium) found there to the soil's clay percentage. This is commonly expressed in hundredths of a mole of cations per kilogram of clay, i.e. cmol (+) kg^{−1} clay.

== See also ==
- Mesotrophic lake
