= Sphagnum novo-caledoniae =

Conservation status
- Vulnerable (IUCN 3.1)

Scientific classification
- Kingdom: Plantae
- Division: Bryophyta
- Class: Sphagnopsida
- Subclass: Sphagnidae
- Order: Sphagnales
- Family: Sphagnaceae
- Genus: Sphagnum
- Species: S. novo-caledoniae

Binomial name
- Sphagnum novo-caledoniae Paris & Warnst.

Species of moss

Sphagnum novo-caledoniae is a species of plant in the family Sphagnaceae. It is endemic to New Caledonia. Its natural habitat is rivers.

It has been proposed that S. novo-caledoniae be transferred to genus Flatbergium in family Flatbergiaceae.
