= Chordifex abortivus =

Conservation status
- Endangered (EPBC Act)

Scientific classification
- Kingdom: Plantae
- Clade: Tracheophytes
- Clade: Angiosperms
- Clade: Monocots
- Clade: Commelinids
- Order: Poales
- Family: Restionaceae
- Genus: Chordifex
- Species: C. abortivus

Binomial name
- Chordifex abortivus (Nees) B.G.Briggs & L.A.S.Johnson

Species of flowering plant

Chordifex abortivus, commonly known as Manypeaks rush, is a species of rush in the genus Chordifex.

It is an erect, slightly spreading perennial herb typically growing to a height of 60 centimetres (24 in). The culms are hollow jointed with a diameter of 1.5 to 2.5 millimetres (0.06 to 0.10 in) and olive green in color. The culm sheaths are flared with no lamina present, they have numerous branches, with each branch divided again into branchlets and terminating in spikelets. The rhizomes are horizontal to the surface or buried to 1 centimetre (0.4 in) deep, they are pale brown in color tufts of ginger hairs. It has separate male and female plants.

There are three remaining populations of C. abortivus found approximately 40 kilometres (25 mi) apart in the Waychinicup area, east of Albany. It grows among heath or scrub with a sedge understorey in loamy, sandy or gravelly soils. Species associated C. abortivus with include Hakea cucullata, Banksia brownii, Banksia baxteri, Banksia coccinea, Melaleuca striata, Pericalymma ellipticum and Dasypogon bromeliifolius.

It is a declared rare flora, but recorded a significant range extension when surveys were conducted in 2000.
