= Douglas Lake Member =

Geologic formation in Tennessee, United States

- Stratigraphic range: Darriwilian
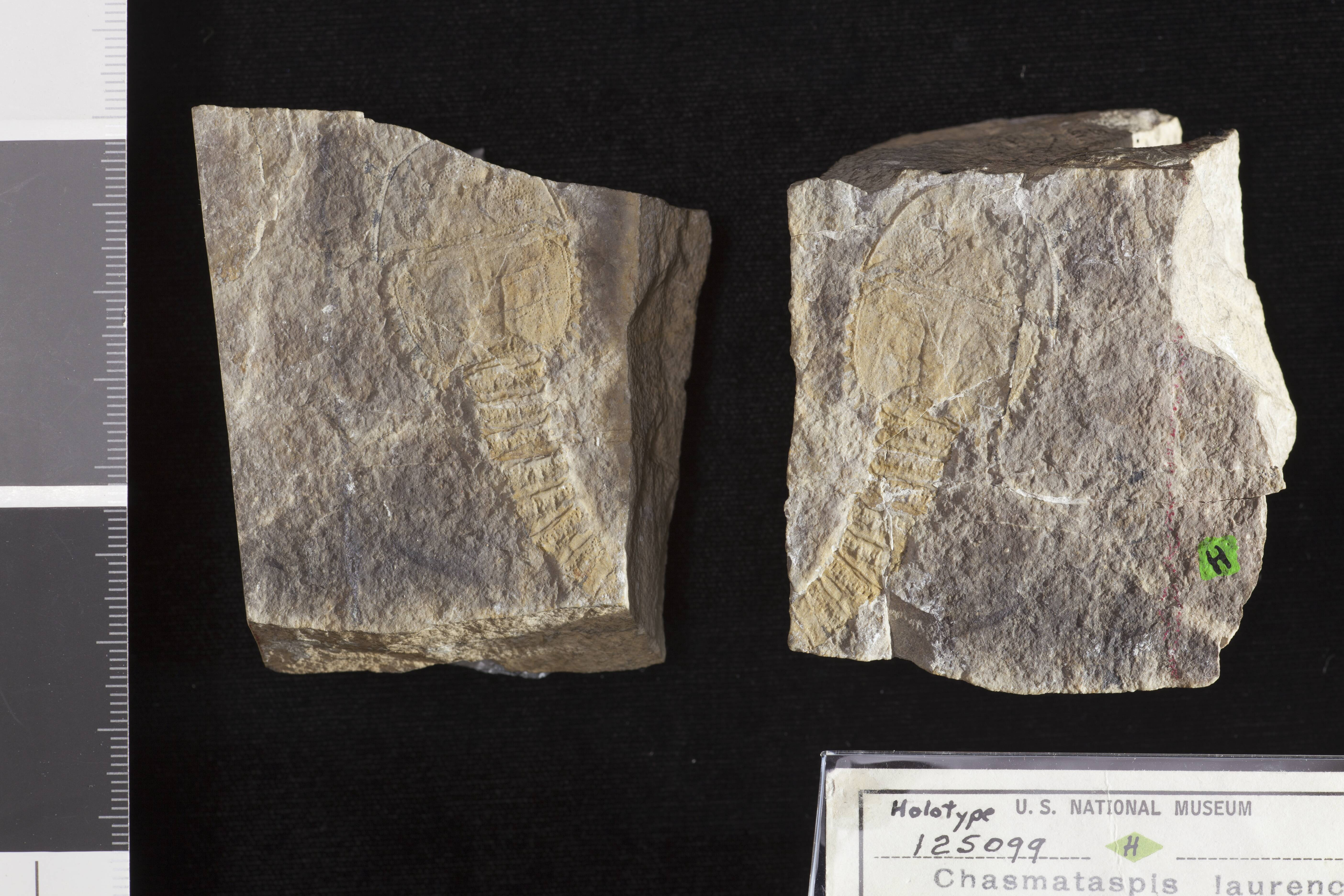
- Holotype specimen of Chasmataspis laurencii
- Type: Member
- Unit of: Lenoir Limestone
- Underlies: nodular member of Lenoir Limestone
- Overlies: Mascot Dolomite (Knox Group)
- Thickness: up to 37 meters (121 ft)

Lithology
- Primary: rubble conglomerate, chert conglomerate, and black dolomite
- Other: Shale (shaly dolomite), volcanic ash

Location
- Region: Tennessee
- Country: United States
- Extent: discontinuous, paleokarst fills in top of Mascot Dolomite

Type section
- Named for: Douglas Lake (Douglas Reservoir)
- Named by: J. Bridge
- Location: north shore of Douglas Lake, 2.4 kilometers (1.5 mi) northeast of the Douglas Dam
- Year defined: 1995

The Douglas Lake Member is a geologic unit of member rank of the Lenoir Limestone that overlies the Mascot Dolomite and underlies typical nodular member of the Lenoir Limestone in Douglas Lake, Tennessee, region. It fills depressions that are part of a regional unconformity at the base of Middle Ordovician strata, locally the Lenoir Limestone, that separates them from the underlying Lower Ordovician strata, locally the Knox Group.

== Nomenclature ==
The type locality of the Douglas Lake Member lies on the north shore of Douglas Lake, 2.4 kilometers (1.5 mi) northeast of Douglas Dam, Jefferson County. It was named by Josiah Bridge for Douglas Lake, Tennessee.

== Lithology ==
The Douglas Lake Member is composed of a diverse set of sedimentary rocks, including rubble conglomerate, chert conglomerate, and black dolomite. In outcrops along the north shore of Lake Douglas, the chert conglomerate overlies the rubble conglomerate and both of which fill prehistoric sinkholes, called paleokarst, developed in upper surface of the Mascot Dolomite. Up to 10 meters (33 ft) of black, fine-grained, thick-bedded dolomite fill two large, prehistoric sinkholes and grade upward almost imperceptibly into Lenoir Limestone. Such paleokarst depression fills, which are part of a regional unconformity, are common throughout this region. They are generally included in the Lenoir Limestone as the Douglas Lake Member.

At Douglas Dam, the Douglas Lake Member consists of three-part sequence of volcanic ash, conglomerate and shale and / or shaly dolomite that fill one of these ancient sinkholes developed in the Mascot Dolomite of the Knox Group. This prehistoric sinkhole varies between 18 and 27 meters (59 and 89 ft) in with and is at least 45 meters (148 ft) deep. The upper unit consisted of about 11 meters (36 ft) of thin-bedded, slabby reworked volcanic ash and impure dolomite with green shale partings. The upper unit overlaid a middle unit, which consisted of varve-like graded beds with concentrations of organic matter at their top and interlayered with recurrent layers and lenses of conglomerate and breccia. It is this unit from which all of the fossils were recovered. The lowest unit consisted of the lowest member is composed of 22 meters (72 ft) of massive, blocky, fine-grained, pyroclastics without laminations. This exposure of the Douglas Lake Member was named the 33 beds in 1944. In 1955, the 33 beds were assigned to the Douglas Lake Member of the Lenoir Limestone. The 33 beds were completely excavated for construction of Douglas Dam by the Tennessee Valley Authority in 1942, but yielded articulated arthropod fossils including Chasmataspis and Douglasocaris. This kind of preservation by volcanic ash is paralleled by Silurian Herefordshire Lagerstätte.

== Fossils ==
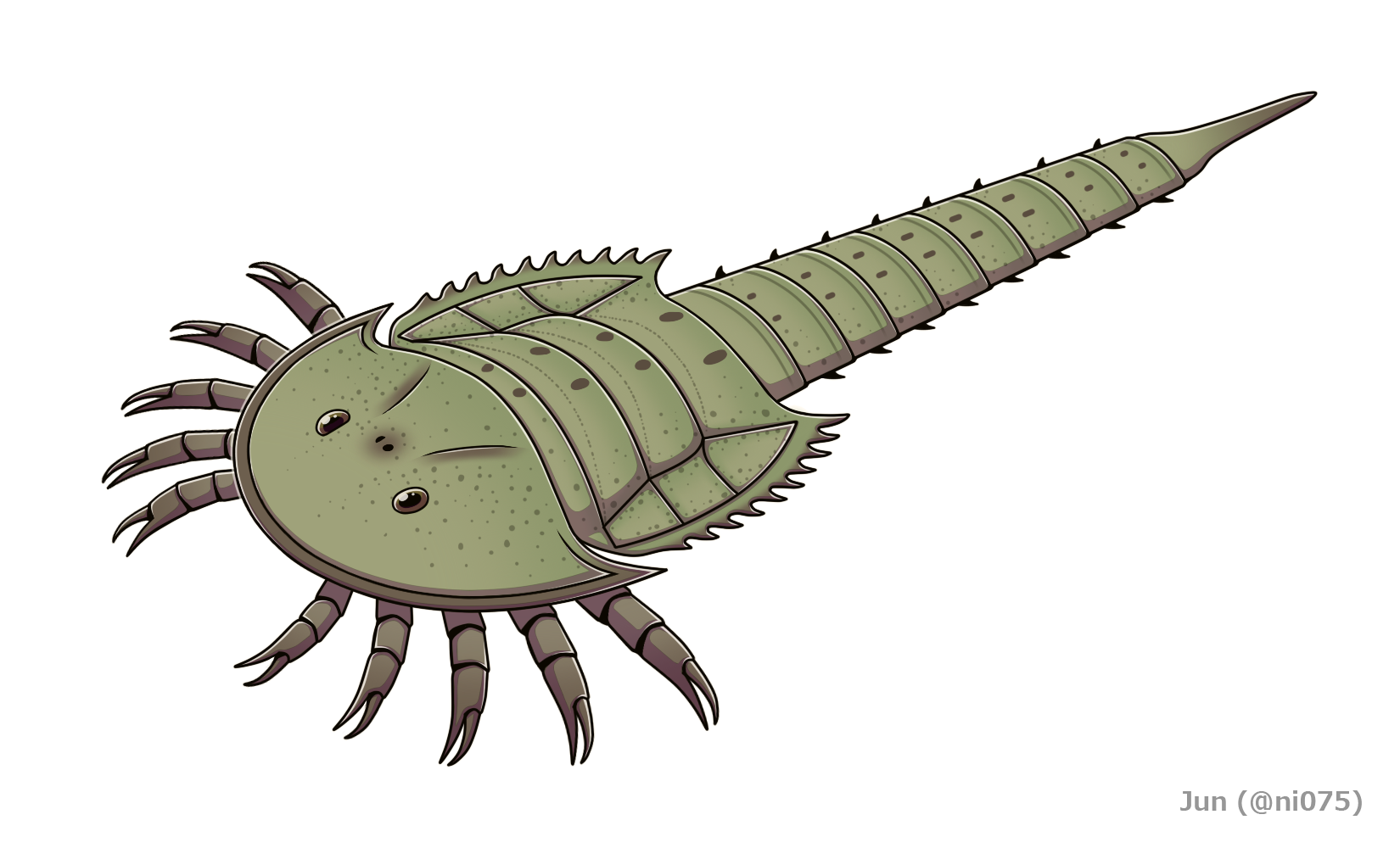
Reconstruction of chasmataspidid Chasmataspis

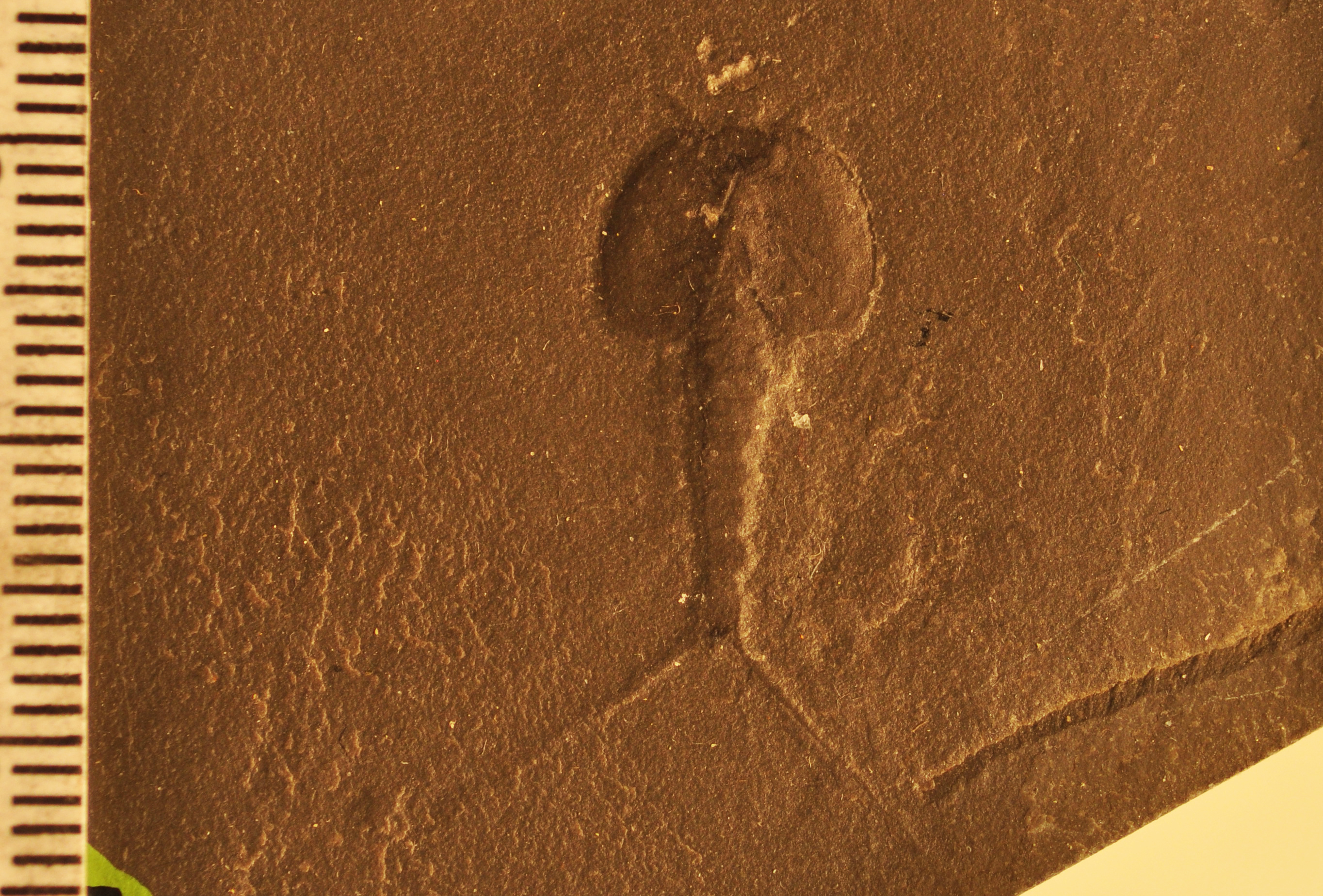
Fossil of crustacean Douglasocaris

At Douglas Dam, the Douglas Lake Member has long been known for its articulated Chasmataspidid Chasmataspsis laurenci and phyllocarid Douglasocaris collinsi. In addition, enigmatic fossil Cestites mirabilis is known, originally interpreted as ctenophore.

A 2000 paper by paleontologist Gregory Retallack interpreted the site to be a terrestrial environment with plant fossils. In 2019, he claimed finding compression fossils of a variety of non-vascular land plants, described four taxa of plants, two taxa of fungi and reinterpreted Cestites as a liverwort. He claimed that the fossils are compressions of original carapaces of the arthropods and the organic carbon of the plant fossils. While this is accepted in a few studies and review of his book, in 2022 researchers such as paleobotanist Dianne Edwards who studied about Paleozoic plants referred his study and commented "When diagnostic features are absent, such fragmentary organic materials can be misinterpreted, leading to implausible attributions". This is agreed in later review as well, considered to lack sufficient characters to be unequivocally assigned to land plants.

Taxon	Interpretation	Image
Cestites mirabilis	Considered as a liverwort in the family Marchantiaceae. It has narrow gametophyte thallus, with a wide midrib and dichotomizing at long intervals. The archegoniophores are parasol shaped and clustered.	
Casterlorum crispum	Considered as a liverwort in the family Leiosporocerotaceae. It has a wide dichotomizing gametophyte thallus with dichotomizing dark lines interpreted as mucilage canals with cyanobacterial symbionts. The sporophyte horns have a thick basal involucre and when dehisced form whip like curls. Spores are small and laevigate. The genus was named in honor of Ken Caster.	
Janegraya sibylla	Considered as a minute balloonwort (Sphaerocarpaceae), similar to living Sphaerocarpos. Its spores are permanent tetrads closed within a thin perine, widely known among Ordovician dispersed spores as Tetrahedraletes. The generic name honors Jane Gray, and the epithet means "prophetess".	
Dollyphyton boucotii	Considered as a peat moss in the family Flatbergiaceae. Its leaves are wide and have lateral teeth. Its capsule is terminal on a short pseudopodium. Unlike most peat mosses Dollyphyton has broad leaves like those of the living peat moss Flatbergium, considered basal to Sphagnales. The generic name honors Dolly Parton whose Dollywood resort is nearby. The epithet honors Art Boucot.	
Edwardsiphyton ovatum	Considered as a moss in the family Pottiaceae. It has narrow acutely pointed leaves and recurved capsules. Spores are small and verrucate. The genus was named in honor of Dianne Edwards, and the epithet refers to the shape of the capsules.	
Palaeoglomus strotheri	Microscopic mycorrhizal fungus.	
Prototaxites honeggeri	Considered as the earliest appearance of genus of giant fungi Prototaxites.	

== Age ==
The paleokarst depressions occupied by the Douglas Lake Member are part of the Knox Unconformity that separates the Lower Ordovician Knox Group from the Middle Ordovician Chickamauga Group. The Lenoir Limestone is the basal unit of the Chickamauga Group in the Douglas Lake region. In this region, the Knox Unconformity is a highly irregular surface, which appears to represent karst terrain that formed during a 12- to 13-million-year-long period of subaerial exposure that forms a hiatus in sedimentary record between the Sauk and Tippecanoe sequences. This unconformity represents periods of falling relative sea level starting in latter part of the Floian Stage, which halted the accumulation marine sediments of the Knox Group and exposed the region to terrestrial erosion and karstification. It is not until late in the Darriwilian Stage that rises in relative sea level drowned the Douglas Lake region and initiated the accumulation of the marine sediments that now comprise the Lenoir Limestone. Therefore, the Douglas Lake Member and the fossils it contains are younger than the underlying Floian strata and older than the late Darriwilian limestones of the Lenoir Limestone.

== Depositional environment ==
At Douglas Dam, the Douglas Lake Member is argued to have accumulated within a cenote at a time of lowered sea level and, based on paleogeographic reconstructions, to have been many kilometers from the sea. Caster and Brooks differently interpreted the environment of deposition at Douglas Dam as being a marine submarine spring fed by an underground channel or system of underground channels from the nearby land. Steinhauff and Walker suggested that a lagoonal marginal marine setting is the most likely.

== See also ==
- List of fossiliferous stratigraphic units in Tennessee
