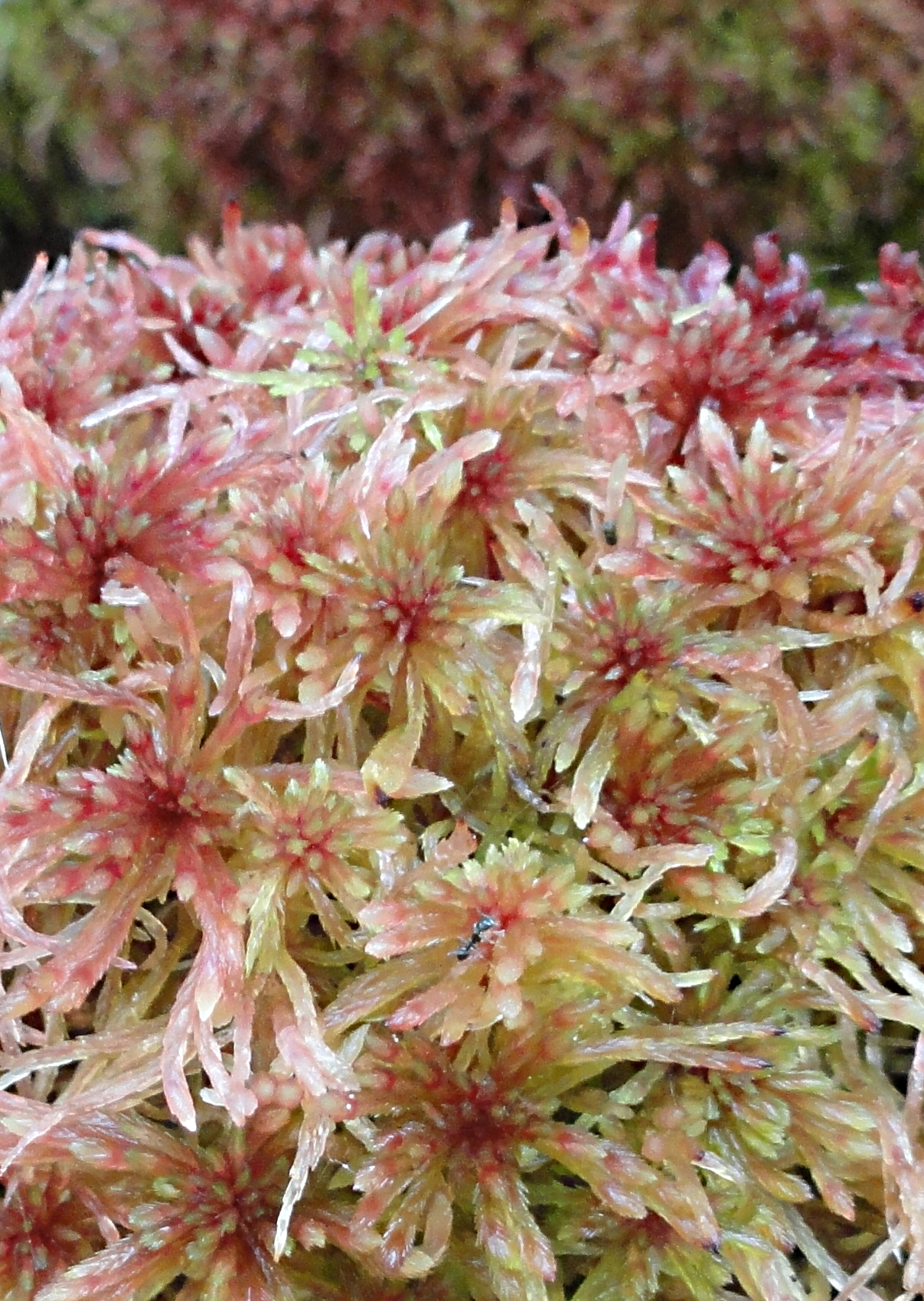

Scientific classification
- Kingdom: Plantae
- Clade: Embryophytes
- Division: Bryophyta
- Class: Sphagnopsida
- Subclass: Sphagnidae
- Order: Sphagnales
- Family: Sphagnaceae
- Genus: Sphagnum
- Species: S. russowii

Binomial name
- Sphagnum russowii Warnst.

= Sphagnum russowii =

Species of moss

Sphagnum russowii, Russow's sphagnum or Russow's bogmoss, is a species of peat moss with a Holarctic distribution.

== Characteristics ==
This moss type is noted as a medium to large plant, formulating carpets or hummocks. It is often deep red and/or green and banded in appearance, as a result of irregular pigmentation. Its branches present in straight lines, with a tongue-shaped stem leaf, leading in many cases to a notched, rounded tip.

== Habitat ==
Sphagnum russowii is often found at sites which are moderately nutrient-enriched. This includes:

- Wooded mires
- Grassy and rocky banks
- Moors
- Woodland
- Bogs
- Humid, heather-dominated banks
