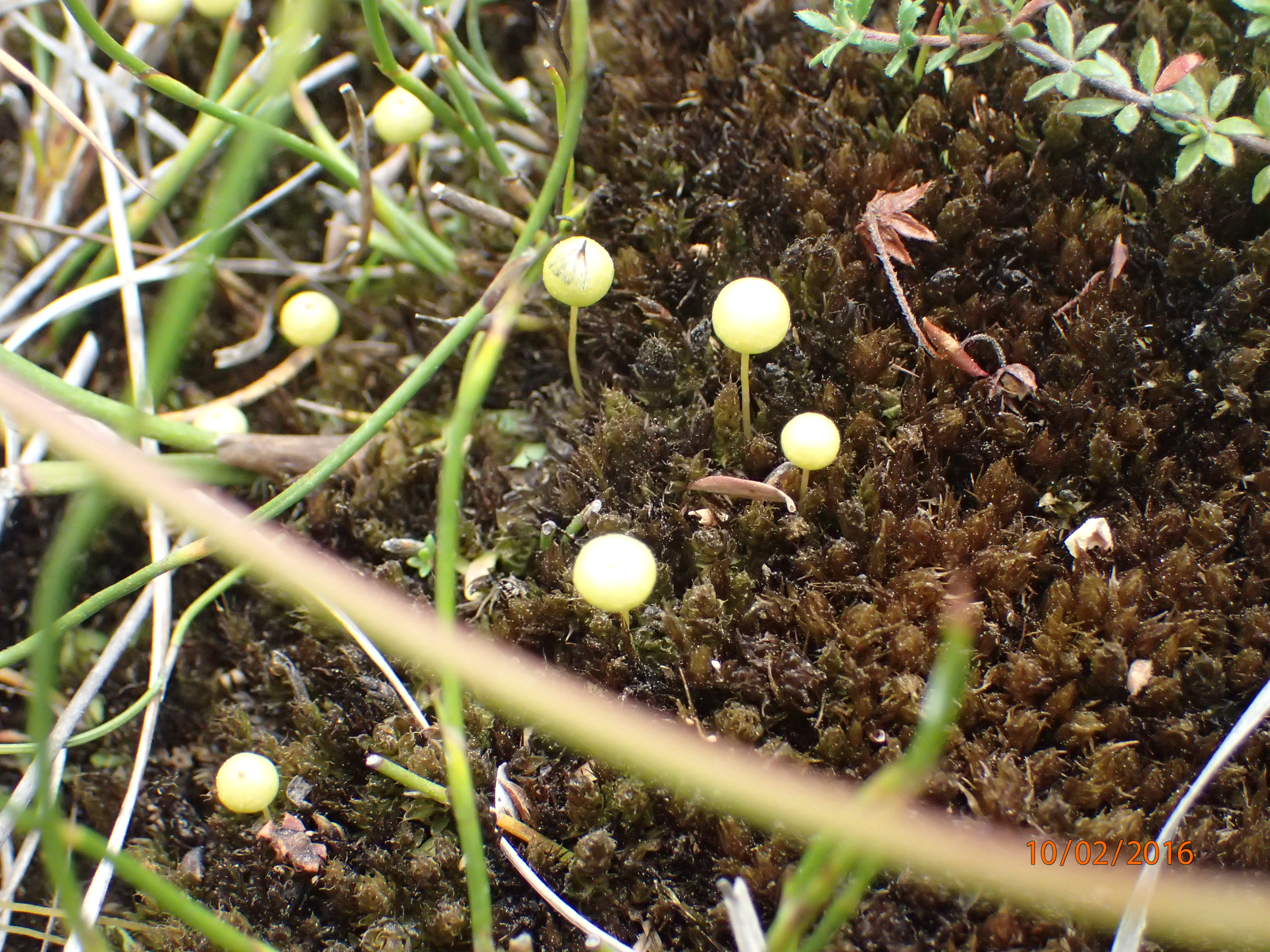
- Ambuchanania leucobryoides.

Scientific classification
- Kingdom: Plantae
- Division: Bryophyta
- Class: Sphagnopsida
- Order: Sphagnales
- Family: Ambuchananiaceae; Seppelt & H.A.Crum

Genera
- Ambuchanania; Eosphagnum

= Ambuchananiaceae =

Family of mosses

Ambuchananiaceae is a family of moss in the order Sphagnales with only two genera, Ambuchanania and Eosphagnum.
