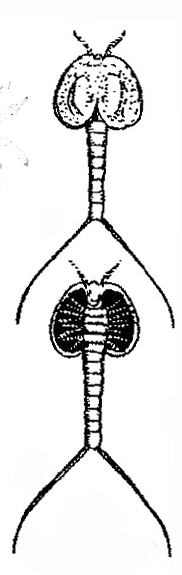
- Holotype of Douglasocaris collinsi, from the Douglas Lake Member of Lenoir Limestone, at Douglas Dam, Tennessee.

Scientific classification
- Kingdom: Animalia
- Phylum: Arthropoda
- Clade: Pancrustacea
- Class: Malacostraca
- Family: †Douglasocaridae; Caster & Brooks, 1956
- Genus: †Douglasocaris; Caster & Brooks, 1956
- Species: †D. collinsi

Binomial name
- †Douglasocaris collinsi Caster & Brooks, 1956

= Douglasocaris =

Douglasocaris Temporal range: Middle Ordovician (Darriwilian), 460 Ma

Genus of small freshwater animals

Douglasocaris is a genus of bivalved malacostracan, sometimes classified instead as either a phyllocarid or a notostracan, from the Middle Ordovician (Darriwilian, 460 million years old) Douglas Lake Member of the Lenoir Limestone from Douglas Dam, Tennessee, United States.

Its type and only species is Douglasocaris collinsi.

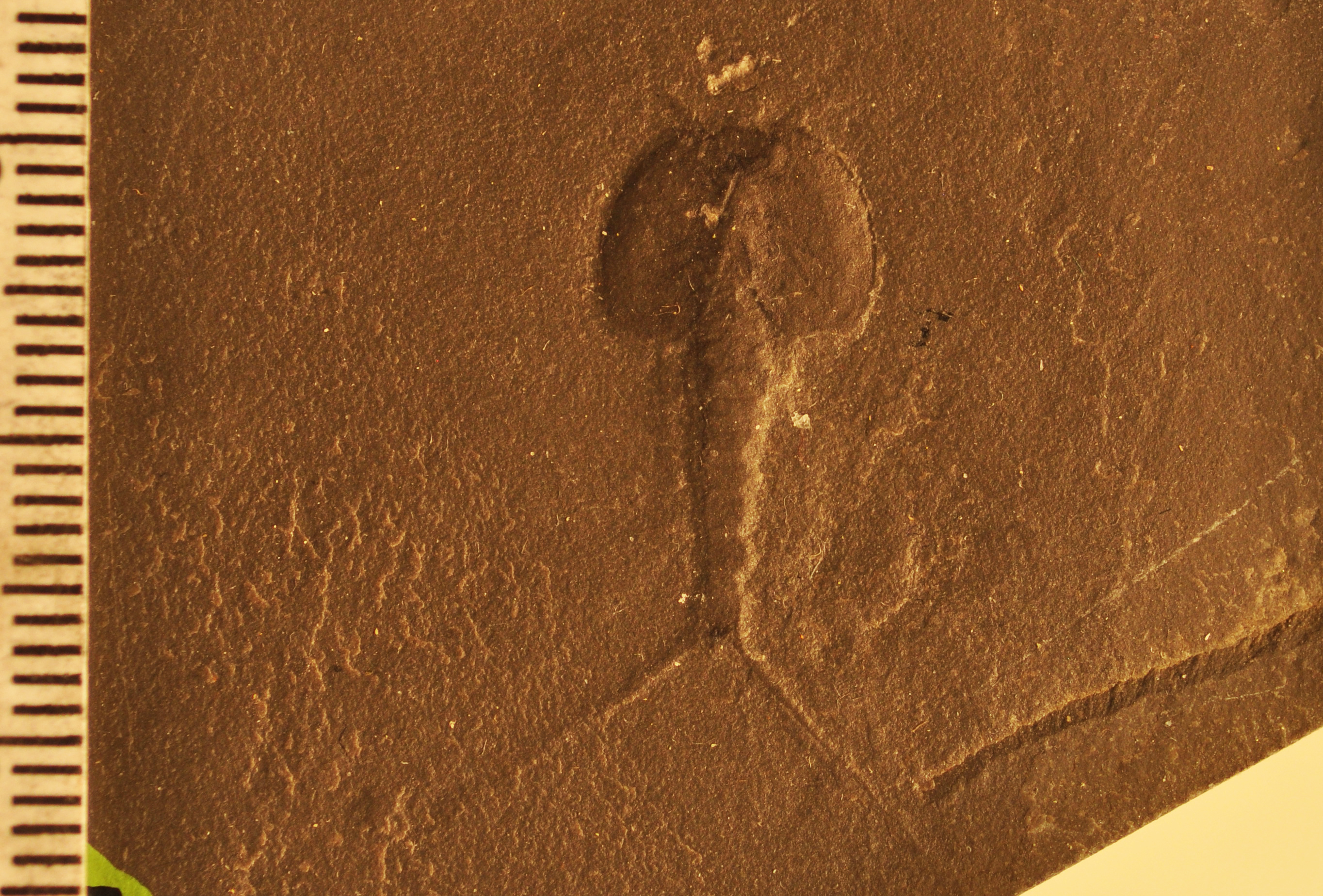
Type specimen of Douglasocaris collinsi

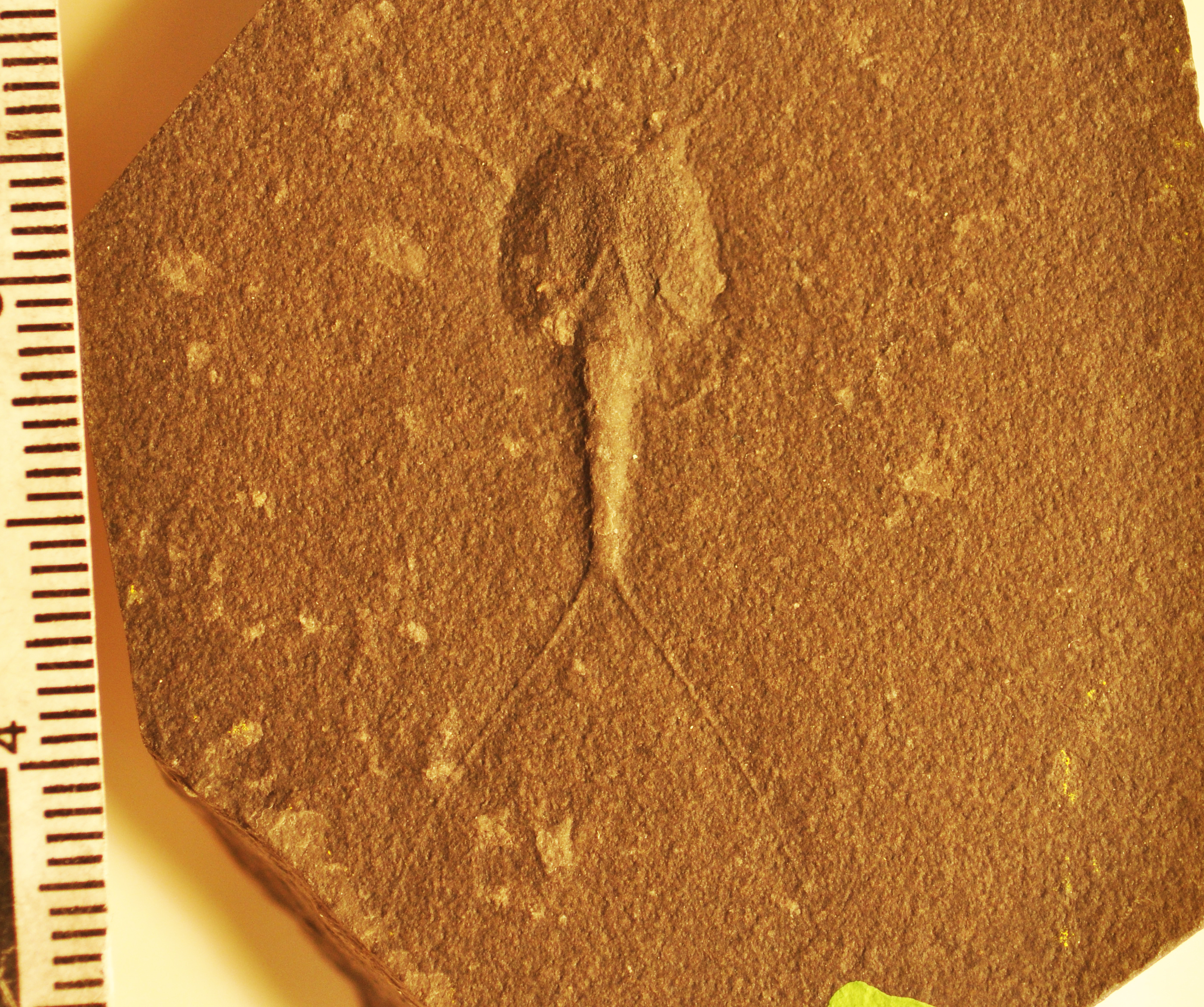
Counterpart of type specimen of Douglasocaris collinsi'
