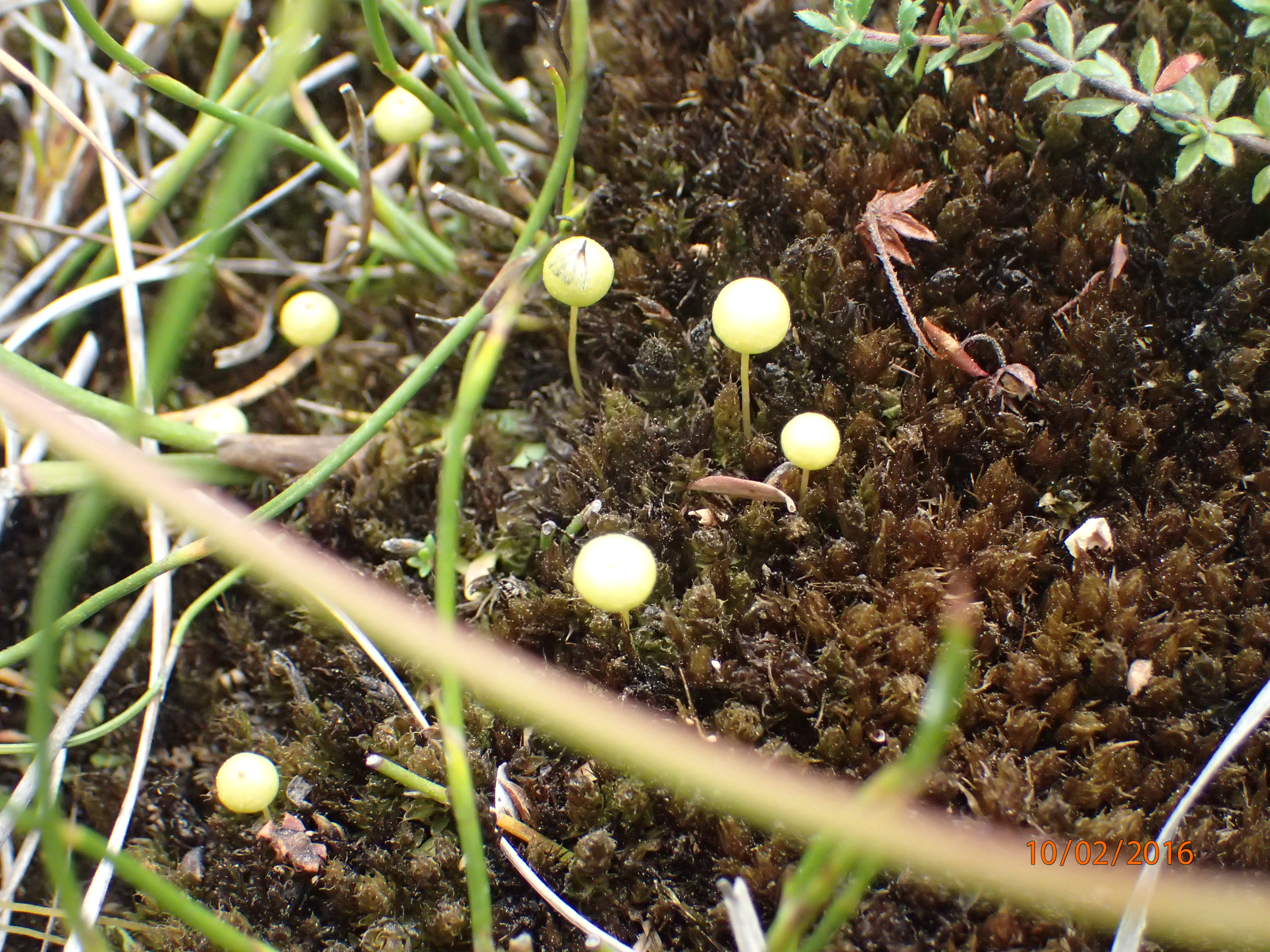

Conservation status
- Vulnerable (IUCN 2.3)

Scientific classification
- Kingdom: Plantae
- Division: Bryophyta
- Class: Sphagnopsida
- Subclass: Sphagnidae
- Order: Sphagnales
- Family: Ambuchananiaceae
- Genus: Ambuchanania; Seppelt & H.A.Crum
- Species: A. leucobryoides

Binomial name
- Ambuchanania leucobryoides (Yamaguchi, Seppelt & Iwatsuki) Seppelt & H.A.Crum

Synonyms
- Sphagnum leucobryoides T.Yamag., Seppelt & Z.Iwats.

= Ambuchanania =

Genus of mosses

Ambuchanania leucobryoides is the only species in the monotypic genus Ambuchanania. It is a Sphagnum-like moss endemic to Tasmania. Originally described as a species of Sphagnum, it is now a separate genus named after the original collector Alex M. Buchanan, (b.1944) an Australian botanist from the Tasmanian Herbarium in Hobart, (it was first collected in 1987). A. leucobryoides differs from the family Sphagnaceae in having elongate antheridia. It is entirely restricted to south-west Tasmania's Wilderness World Heritage Area where it occurs on white Precambrian quartzitic sand deposited by alluvial flows, and on margins of buttongrass (Gymnoschoenus sphaerocephalus) sedge land. Species most commonly found in association with A. leucobryoides include: Leptocarpus tenax, Chordifex hookeri, and Actinotus suffocatus. Currently, A. leucobryoides is listed as rare under the Tasmanian Threatened Species Protection Act 1995.

== Description ==
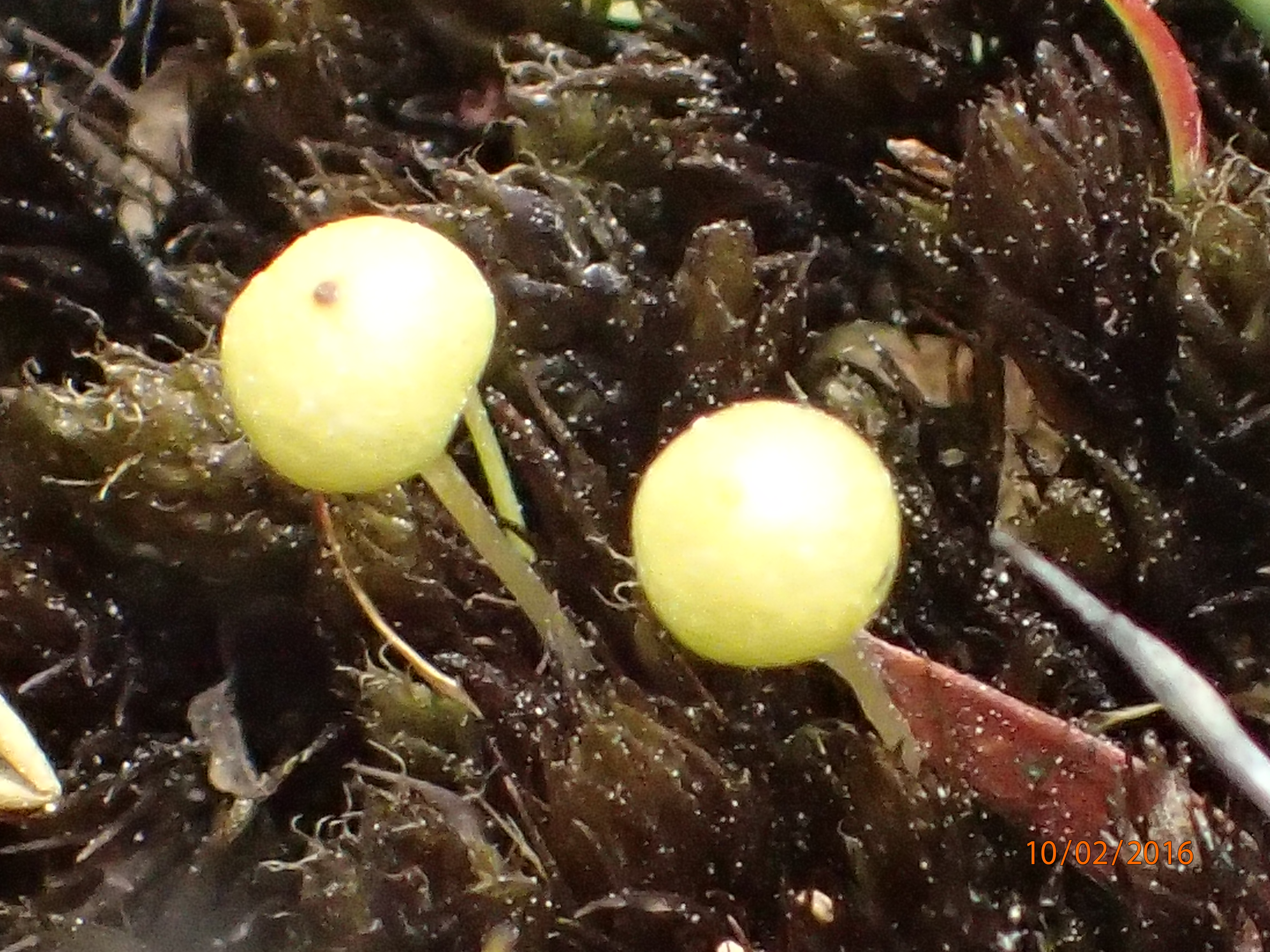
Distinct globose sporophyte capsules of the rare monotypic moss species Ambuchanania leucobryoides

Mature plants are small, pale brown or whitish green when dry. The stems are approximately 2 cm long, and are irregularly and sparsely branched. Leaves on the stem have a broadly lanceolate shape 3.6-4.3 mm long. Spore capsules are whitish-yellow and globose, atop a seta (stalk) that is 1.2 cm long.
