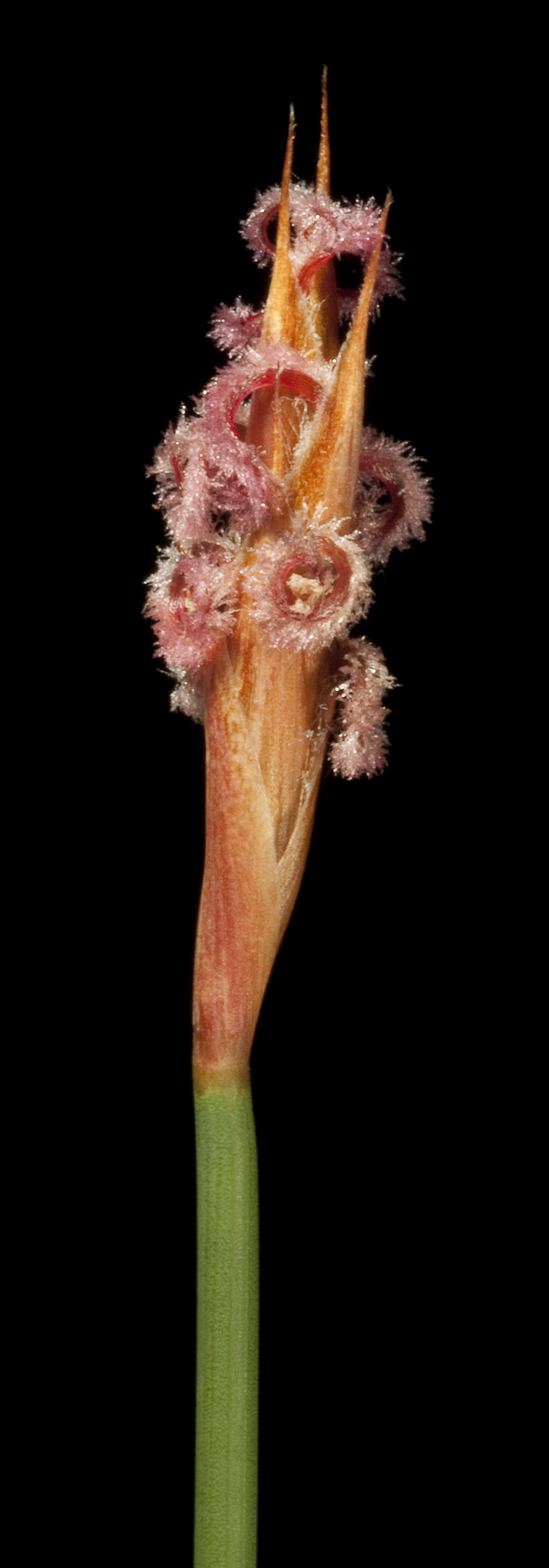
- (female)

Scientific classification
- Kingdom: Plantae
- Clade: Tracheophytes
- Clade: Angiosperms
- Clade: Monocots
- Clade: Commelinids
- Order: Poales
- Family: Restionaceae
- Genus: Chordifex
- Species: C. laxus

Binomial name
- Chordifex laxus (R.Br.) B.G.Briggs & L.A.S.Johnson

Synonyms
- Restio deformis R.Br. Restio laxus R.Br. Restio chasmatocoleus F.Muell.

= Chordifex laxus =

Species of flowering plant

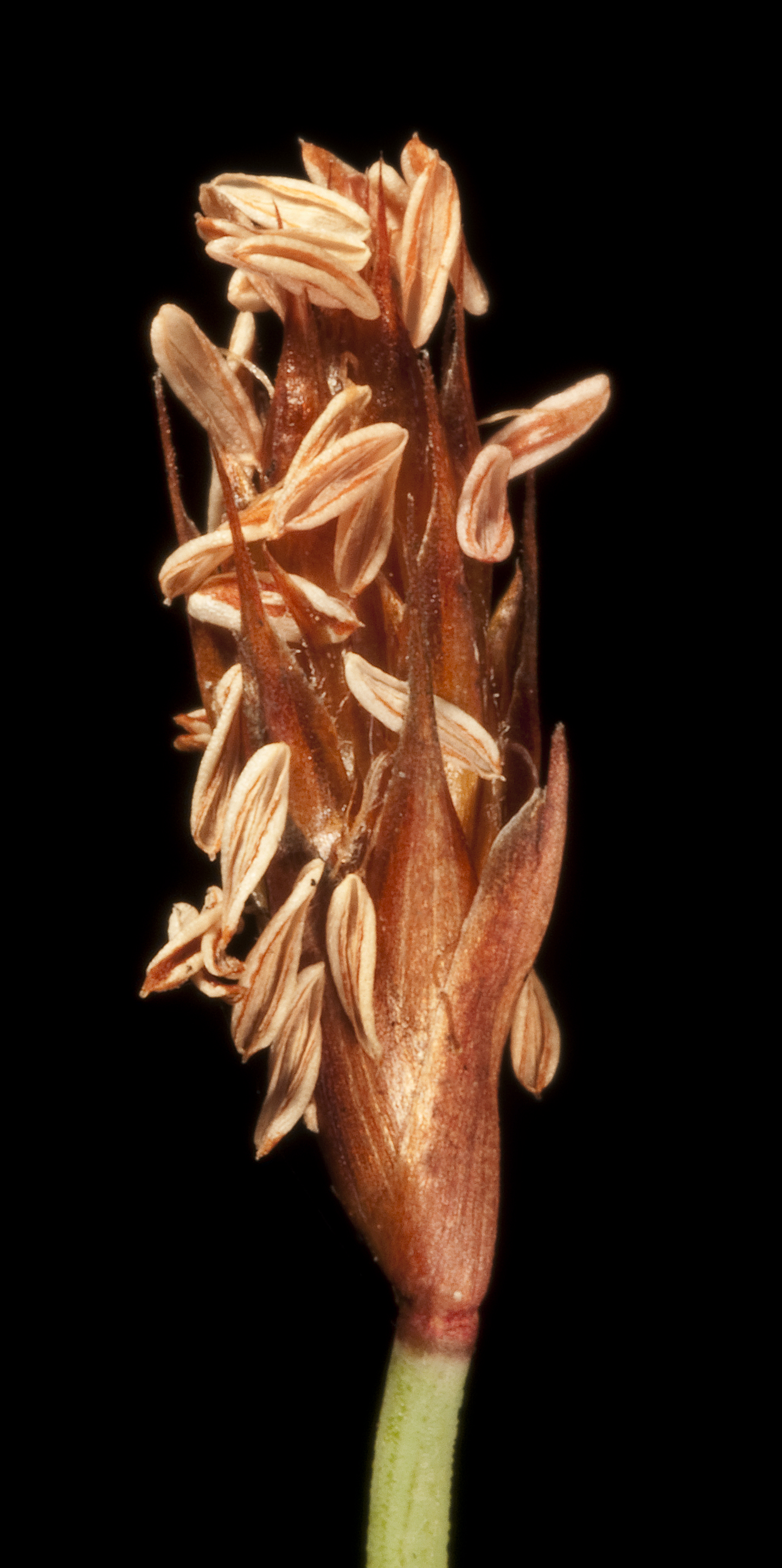
(male)

Chordifex laxus is a rush species of the genus Chordifex in the family Restionaceae. It is endemic to the south-west of Western Australia.

It was first described by Robert Brown in 1810 as Restio laxus, but was transferred to the genus, Chordifex by Lawrie Johnson and Barbara Briggs in 1998.
