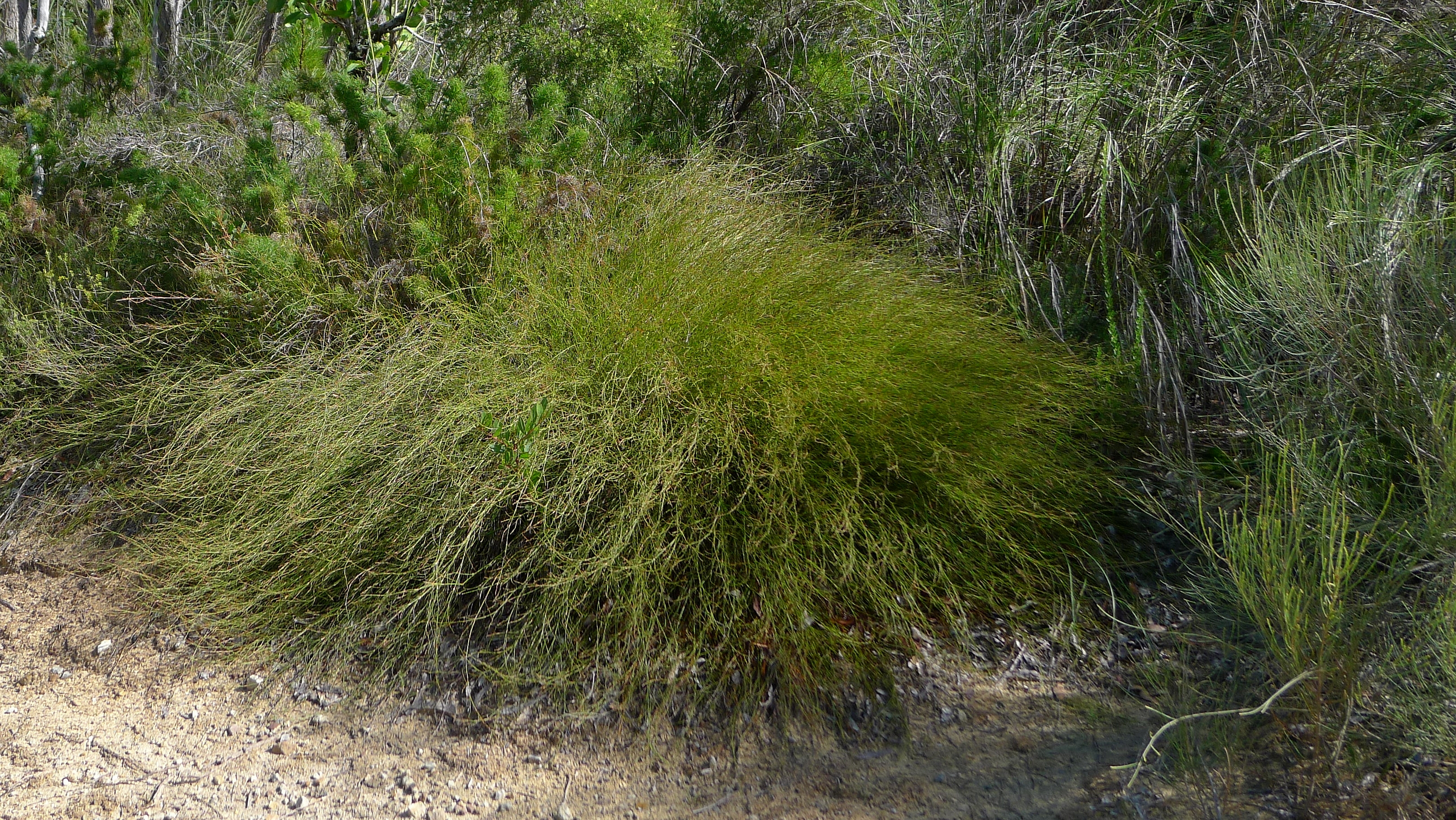

Scientific classification
- Kingdom: Plantae
- Clade: Tracheophytes
- Clade: Angiosperms
- Clade: Monocots
- Clade: Commelinids
- Order: Poales
- Family: Restionaceae
- Genus: Chordifex
- Species: C. dimorphus

Binomial name
- Chordifex dimorphus (R.Br.) B.G.Briggs

Synonyms
- Guringalia dimorpha (R.Br.) B.G.Briggs & L.A.S.Johnson; Restio dimorphus R.Br.; Baloskion dimorphum (R.Br.) B.G.Briggs & L.A.S.Johnson

= Chordifex dimorphus =

Species of flowering plant

Chordifex dimorphus is an Australian species of plant. A perennial, dioecious herb found in the Sydney and Blue Mountains regions. Often seen growing in rocky ground from 30 to 100 cm tall, with stems 1 to 1.3 mm in diameter. The specific epithet dimorphus is derived from Latin, meaning "two forms". One of the many plants first published by Robert Brown with the type known as "(J.) v.v." Appearing in his Prodromus Florae Novae Hollandiae et Insulae Van Diemen in 1810.
