= Protosphagnum =

Protosphagnum Temporal range: Permian

Scientific classification
- Kingdom: Plantae
- Clade: Embryophytes
- Division: Bryophyta
- Class: Sphagnopsida
- Order: †Protosphagnales; Neuburg
- Family: †Protosphagnaceae; Ignatov
- Genus: †Protosphagnum; Nejburg
- Species: †P. nervatum

Binomial name
- †Protosphagnum nervatum Nejburg

Extinct genus of mosses

Protosphagnum nervatum is the only known species of order Protosphagnales. It is only known from the Permian fossil record. In many ways, it resembles the living moss genus Sphagnum, though its leaf cells are not as strongly dimorphic as in Sphagnum.

== Discovery ==
Protosphagnum was 1st described by the Russian paleobotanist Maria Fridrikhovna Neuburg. He published his findings in 1960 based on the material collected from Siberia.
