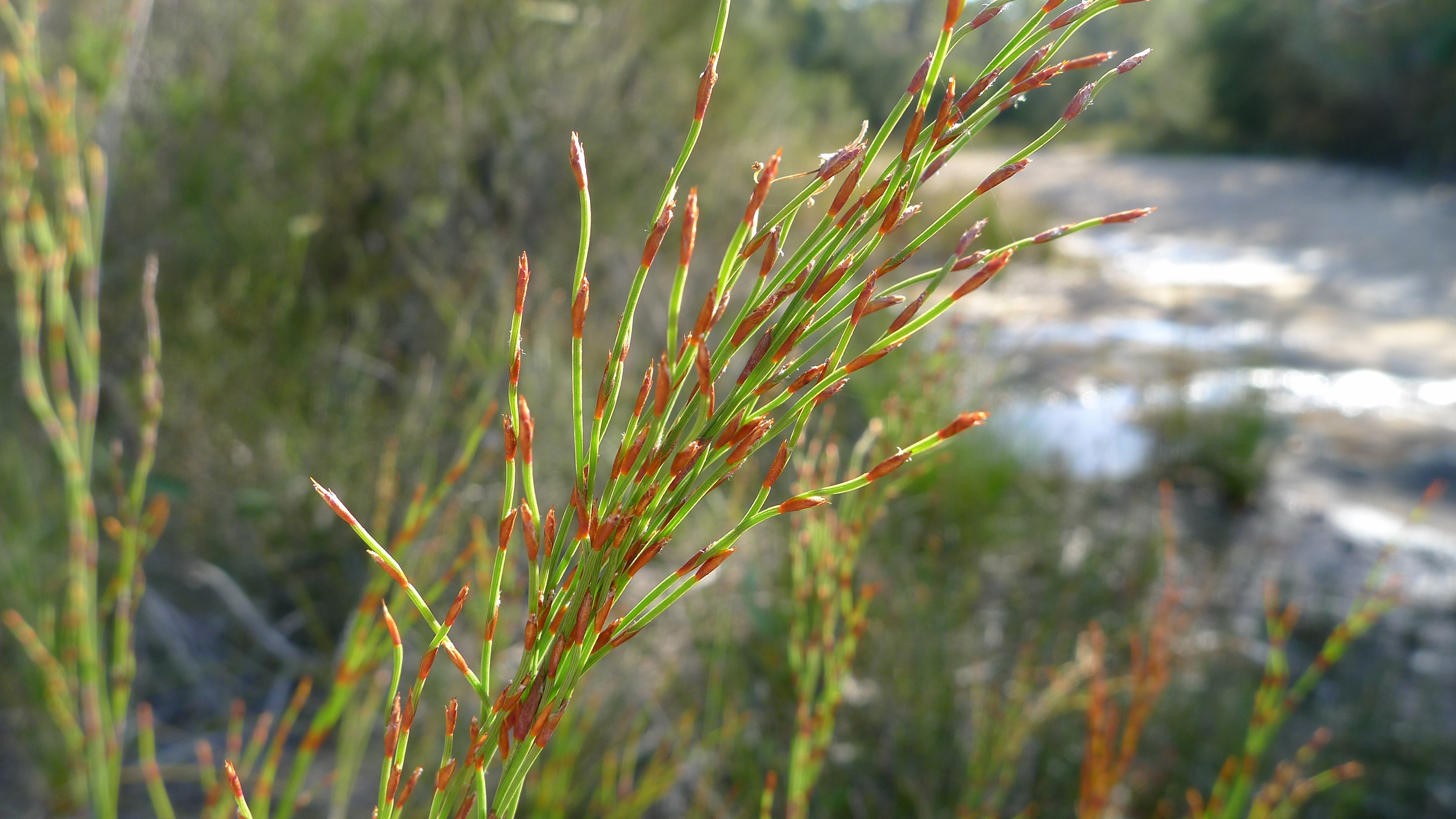
- Chordifex fastigiatus

Scientific classification
- Kingdom: Plantae
- Clade: Tracheophytes
- Clade: Angiosperms
- Clade: Monocots
- Clade: Commelinids
- Order: Poales
- Family: Restionaceae
- Genus: Chordifex; B.G.Briggs & L.A.S.Johnson

Type species
- Chordifex stenandrus B.G.Briggs & L.A.S.Johnson

Synonyms
- Acion B.G.Briggs & L.A.S.Johnson; Guringalia B.G.Briggs & L.A.S.Johnson; Saropsis B.G.Briggs & L.A.S.Johnson

= Chordifex =

Genus of flowering plants

Chordifex is a genus of plants in the Restionaceae described as a genus in 1998. The entire genus is endemic to Australia.

== Species ==
20 species are accepted.

- Chordifex abortivus Nees) B.G.Briggs & L.A.S.Johnson
- Chordifex amblycoleus (F.Muell.) B.G.Briggs & L.A.S.Johnson
- Chordifex capillaceus B.G.Briggs & L.A.S.Johnson
- Chordifex chaunocoleus (F.Muell.) B.G.Briggs & L.A.S.Johnson
- Chordifex crispatus (R.Br.) B.G.Briggs & L.A.S.Johnson
- Chordifex dimorphus (R.Br.) B.G.Briggs
- Chordifex fastigiatus (R.Br.) B.G.Briggs
- Chordifex gracilior (F.Muell. ex Benth.) B.G.Briggs & L.A.S.Johnson
- Chordifex hookeri (D.I.Morris) B.G.Briggs
- Chordifex isomorphus (K.W.Dixon & Meney) B.G.Briggs & L.A.S.Johnson
- Chordifex jacksonii B.G.Briggs & L.A.S.Johnson
- Chordifex laxus (R.Br.) B.G.Briggs & L.A.S.Johnson
- Chordifex leucoblepharus (Gilg) B.G.Briggs & L.A.S.Johnson
- Chordifex microcodon B.G.Briggs & L.A.S.Johnson
- Chordifex monocephalus (R.Br.) B.G.Briggs
- Chordifex ornatus (Steud.) B.G.Briggs & L.A.S.Johnson
- Chordifex reseminans B.G.Briggs & L.A.S.Johnson
- Chordifex sinuosus B.G.Briggs & L.A.S.Johnson
- Chordifex sphacelatus (R.Br.) B.G.Briggs & L.A.S.Johnson
- Chordifex stenandrus B.G.Briggs & L.A.S.Johnson
