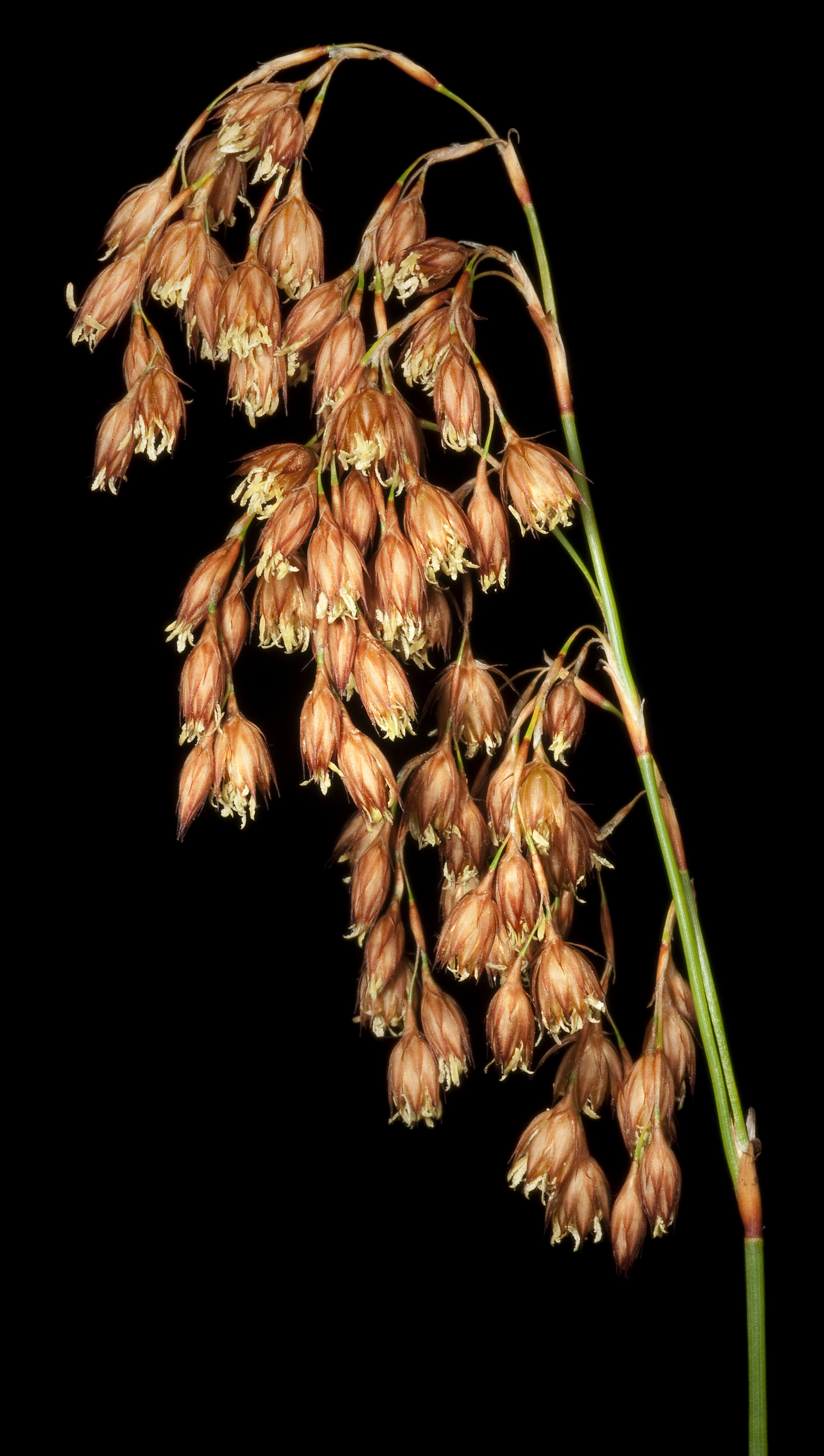
- (male)

Scientific classification
- Kingdom: Plantae
- Clade: Tracheophytes
- Clade: Angiosperms
- Clade: Monocots
- Clade: Commelinids
- Order: Poales
- Family: Restionaceae
- Genus: Chordifex
- Species: C. microdon

Binomial name
- Chordifex microdon B.G.Briggs & L.A.S.Johnson

= Chordifex microcodon =

Species of flowering plant

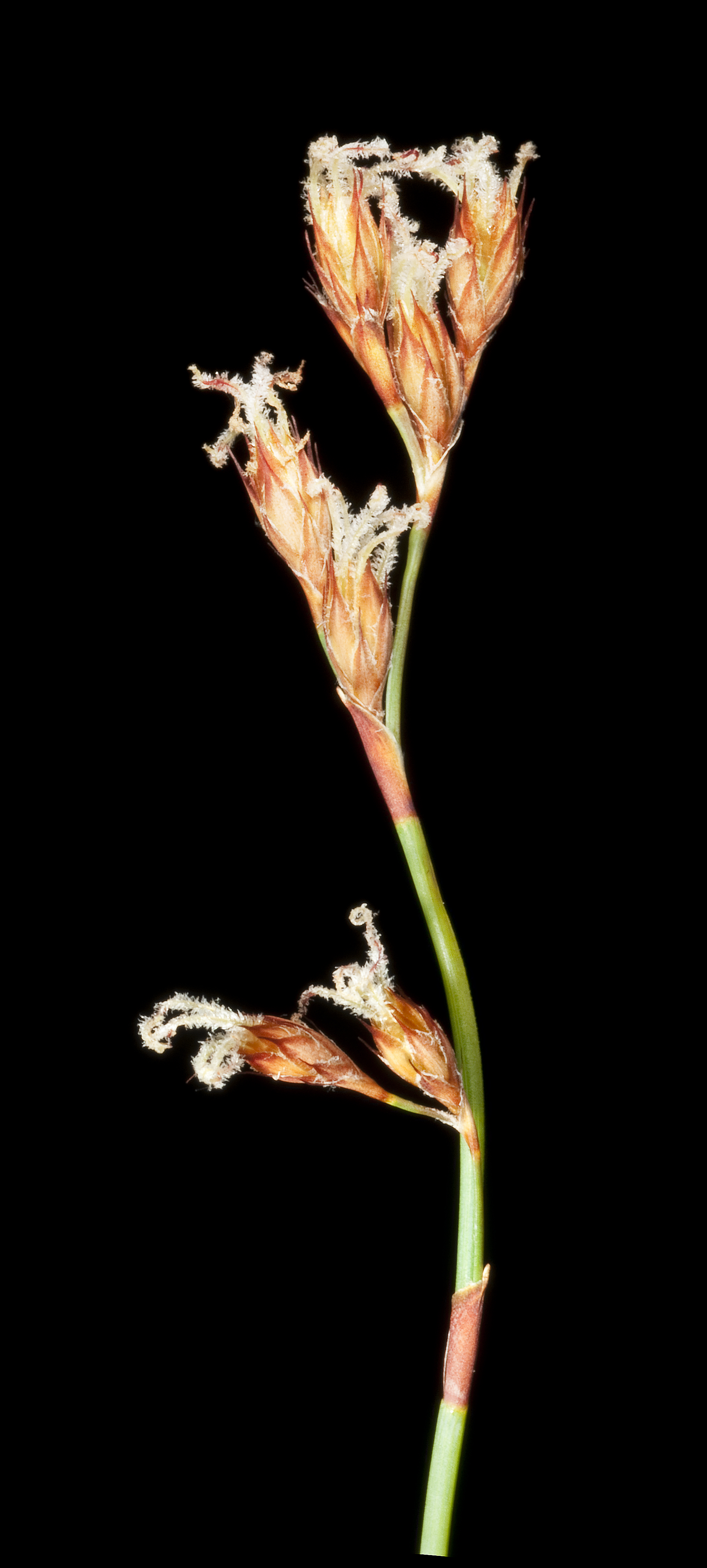
(female)

Chordifex microdon is a rush species of the genus Chordifex in the family Restionaceae, native to Western Australia.

It was first described by Lawrie Johnson and Barbara Briggs in 2004. There are no synonyms.
