= Eosphagnum =

Scientific classification
- Kingdom: Plantae
- Division: Bryophyta
- Class: Sphagnopsida
- Subclass: Sphagnidae
- Order: Sphagnales
- Family: Ambuchananiaceae
- Genus: Eosphagnum; A.J.Shaw
- Species: E. inretortum

Binomial name
- Eosphagnum inretortum (H.A.Crum) A.J.Shaw

Synonyms
- Sphagnum inretortum H.A.Crum

Genus of mosses

Eosphagnum inretortum is a species of moss, and the only species of the genus Eosphagnum. Originally described as a species of Sphagnum, it is now a separate genus on the basis of morphological and genetic differences.
