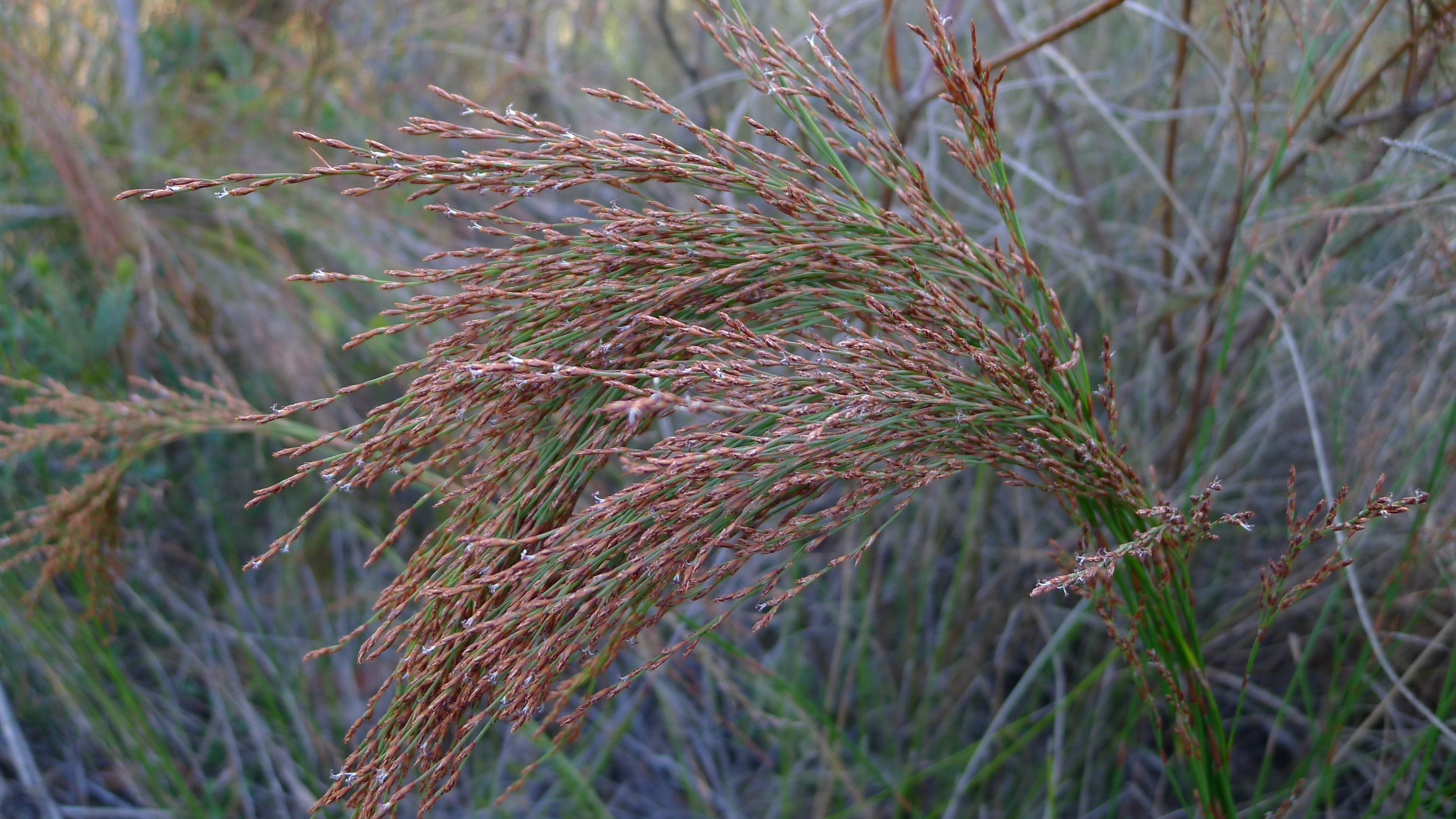
- Heathcote National Park, Australia

Scientific classification
- Kingdom: Plantae
- Clade: Tracheophytes
- Clade: Angiosperms
- Clade: Monocots
- Clade: Commelinids
- Order: Poales
- Family: Restionaceae
- Genus: Chordifex
- Species: C. fastigiatus

Binomial name
- Chordifex fastigiatus (R.Br.) B.G.Briggs

Synonyms
- Saropsis fastigiata; Restio fastigiatus

= Chordifex fastigiatus =

Species of flowering plant

Chordifex fastigiatus, known as the tassel rush, is an Australian species of plant. One of the many plants first published by Robert Brown with the type known as "(J.) v.v." Appearing in his Prodromus Florae Novae Hollandiae et Insulae Van Diemen in 1810.
