= Flatbergiaceae =

Scientific classification
- Kingdom: Plantae
- Division: Bryophyta
- Class: Sphagnopsida
- Order: Sphagnales
- Family: Flatbergiaceae; A.J. Shaw

Genera
- Flatbergium

Family of mosses

Flatbergiaceae is a family of mosses in the order Sphagnales with a single extant genus, Flatbergium.

In addition, an extinct genus, Dollyphyton, based on a fossil from the Middle Ordovician, has been proposed to belong to this family,. However, the interpretation of such fossils as putative plants has been questioned.
