= Lenoir Limestone =

- Stratigraphic range: Ordovician
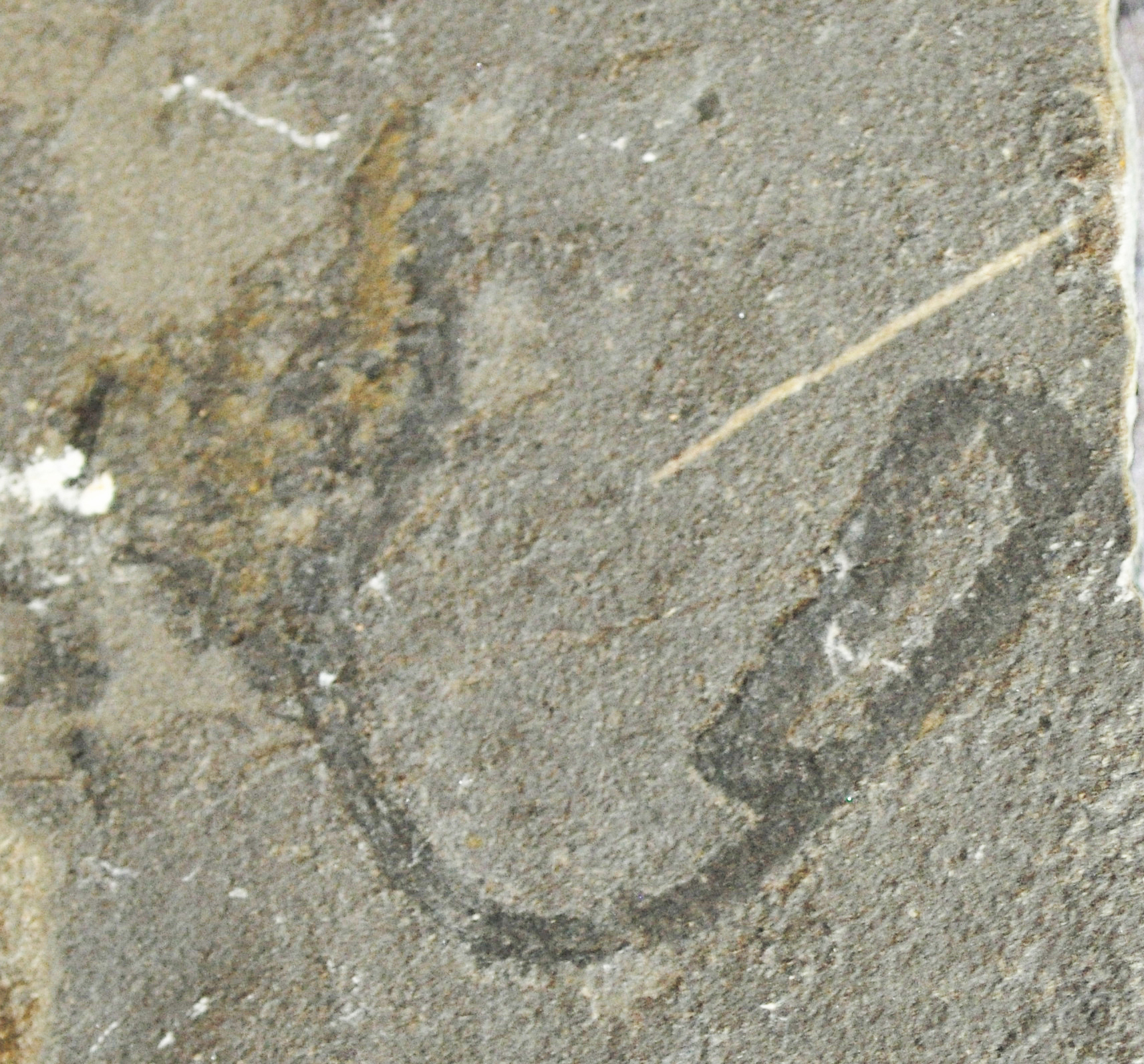
- Fossil from the Douglas Lake Member, Lenoir Limestone
- Type: Formation
- Sub-units: Douglas Lake Member

Location
- Region: Virginia, Tennessee
- Country: United States

The Lenoir Limestone is a geologic formation in Virginia. It preserves fossils dating back to the Ordovician period.

== See also ==
- List of fossiliferous stratigraphic units in Virginia
- Paleontology in Virginia
