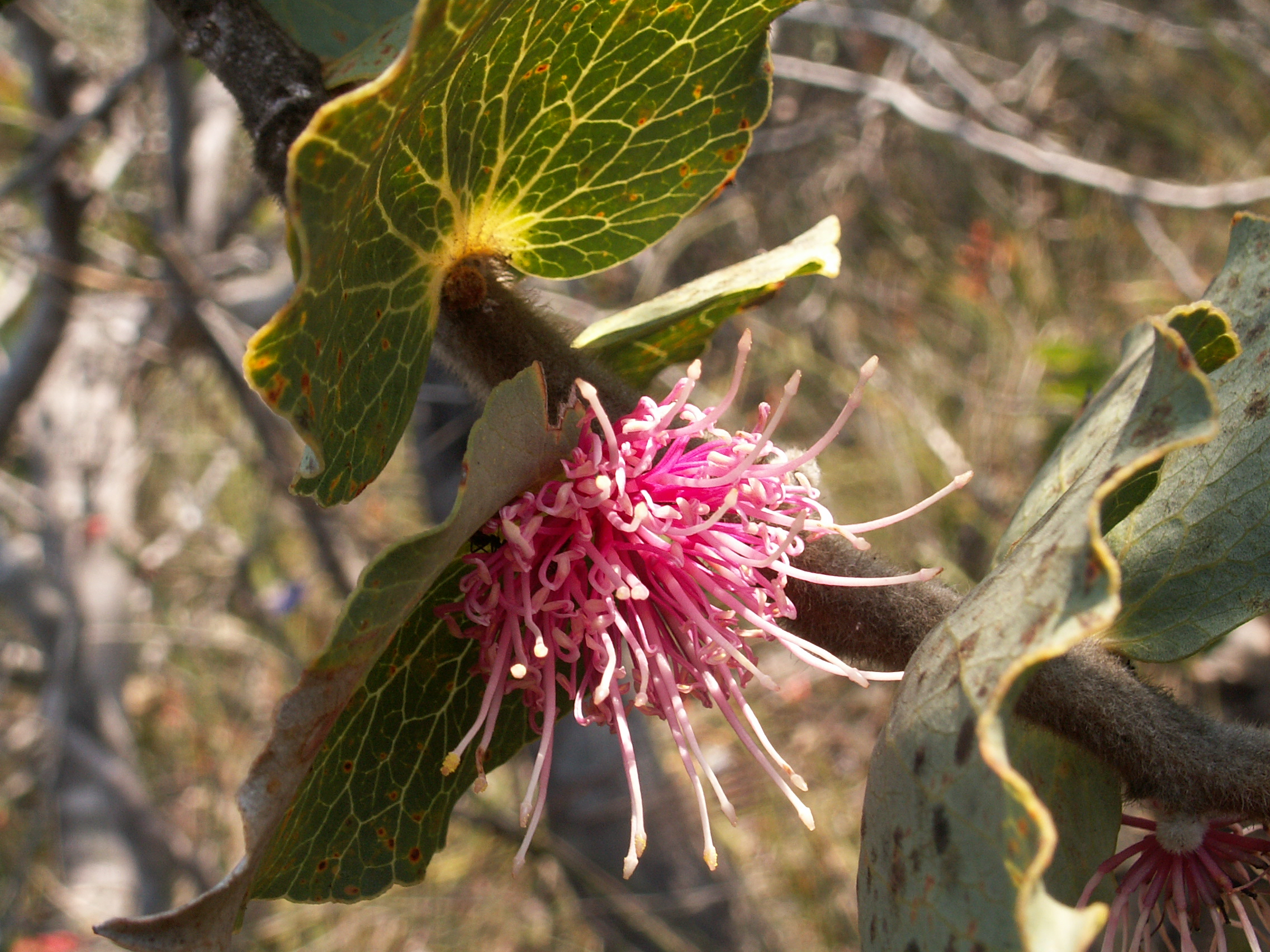
- In Waychinicup National Park.

Conservation status
- Vulnerable (IUCN 3.1)

Scientific classification
- Kingdom: Plantae
- Clade: Tracheophytes
- Clade: Angiosperms
- Clade: Eudicots
- Order: Proteales
- Family: Proteaceae
- Genus: Hakea
- Species: H. cucullata

Binomial name
- Hakea cucullata R.Br.
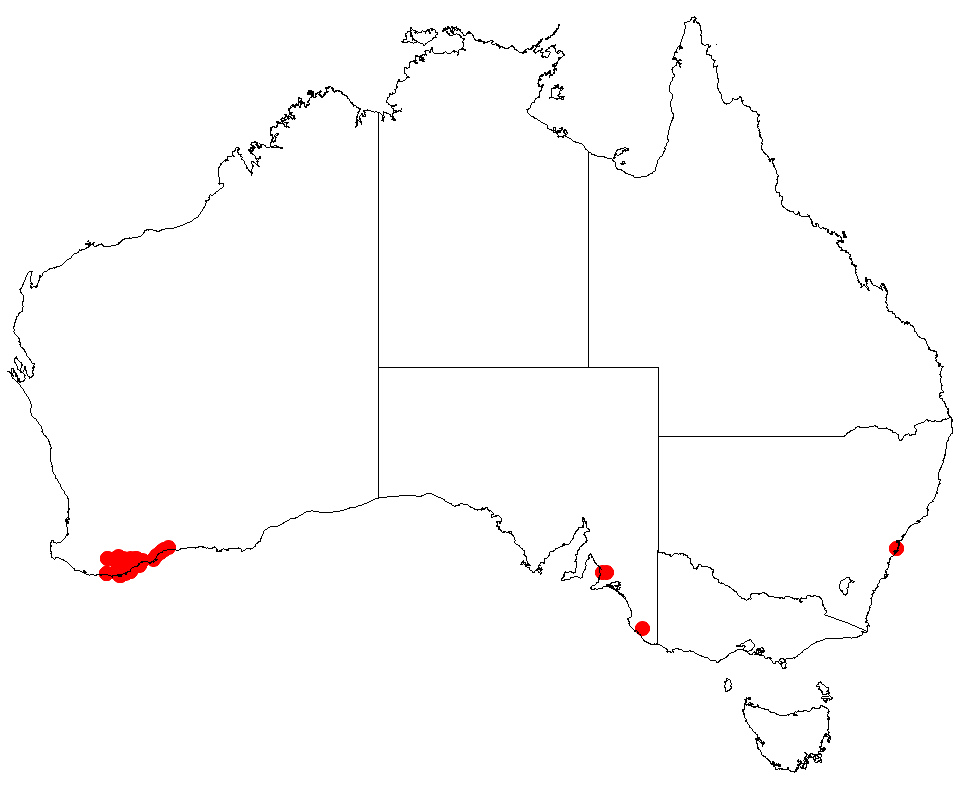
- Occurrence data from Australasian Virtual Herbarium

Synonyms
- Hakea cucullata Sweet

= Hakea cucullata =

Hood-leaved hakea

Species of plant endemic to Western Australia

Hakea cucullata, commonly known as hood-leaved hakea, cup hakea or scallop hakea, is a species of shrub in the family Proteaceae and is endemic to the south-west of Western Australia. It is an attractive shrub with distinctive foliage and large pink, red, or deep purple scented flowers.

== Description ==
Hakea cucullata is an erect shrub growing to a height of 1–5 metres (3–20 ft) with few branches. The young branches are densely covered with short hairs and the flowering stems have dark brown hairs. The leathery leaves are broad egg-shaped 37–75 millimetres (1–3 in) long and 38–90 millimetres (1–4 in) wide. Often with wavy or finely toothed margins and a prominent mid-vein ending in a point at the apex. The leaves are pale green in colour, more or less overlap, distinctly cupped around the stem, flowers and fruit. The inflorescence consists of 25 to 30 deep pink flowers appearing in the leaf axils or at leafless nodes on bright pink stalks 5.5–8 millimetres (0.2–0.3 in) long. The perianth is deep pink at the base paler toward the tip. The pedicels are 5.5–8 mm (0.22–0.31 in) long and smooth. The style is smooth, straight and 17–25 mm (0.67–0.98 in) long. Flowering mainly occurs from August to October. The woody egg-shaped fruit are 2.2–2.8 cm (0.87–1.1 in) long and 1.4–2.0 cm (0.55–0.79 in) wide in groups of 1-5 in leaf axils.

== Taxonomy and naming ==
Hakea cucullata was first described by Robert Brown in 1830 from a specimen collected by William Baxter in 1824 and the description was published in Supplementum primum Prodromi florae Novae Hollandiae. The specific epithet (cucullata) is derived from the Latin word cucullatus meaning "hooded".

== Distribution and habitat ==
Hood-leaved hakea is found in the Stirling Range, south-western Western Australia, east to the Whoogarup Range in the Esperance Plains, Jarrah Forest and Warren biogeographic regions where it grows in sandy mallee heath and occasionally in gravelly lateritic soils.

== Conservation ==
Hakea cucullata is classified as "not threatened" by the Western Australian Government Department of Parks and Wildlife.

== Use in horticulture ==
Scallop hakea is reasonably hardy as a garden plant and has been grown successfully on Kangaroo Island. It is easily propagated from seed and has been successfully grafted onto Hakea salicifolia root stock.
