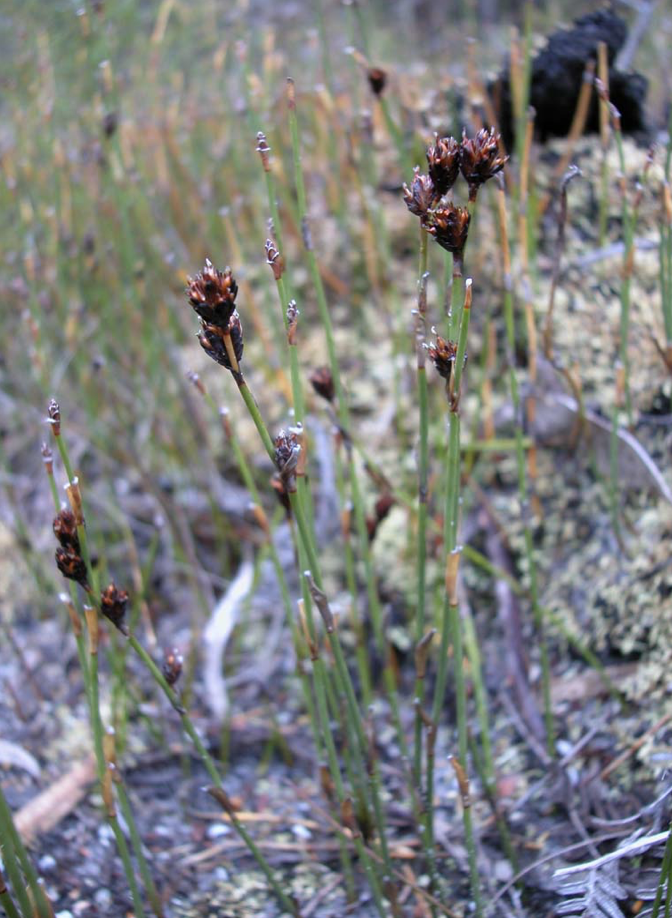

Scientific classification
- Kingdom: Plantae
- Clade: Tracheophytes
- Clade: Angiosperms
- Clade: Monocots
- Clade: Commelinids
- Order: Poales
- Family: Restionaceae
- Genus: Chordifex
- Species: C. hookeri

Binomial name
- Chordifex hookeri (D.I.Morris) B.G.Briggs
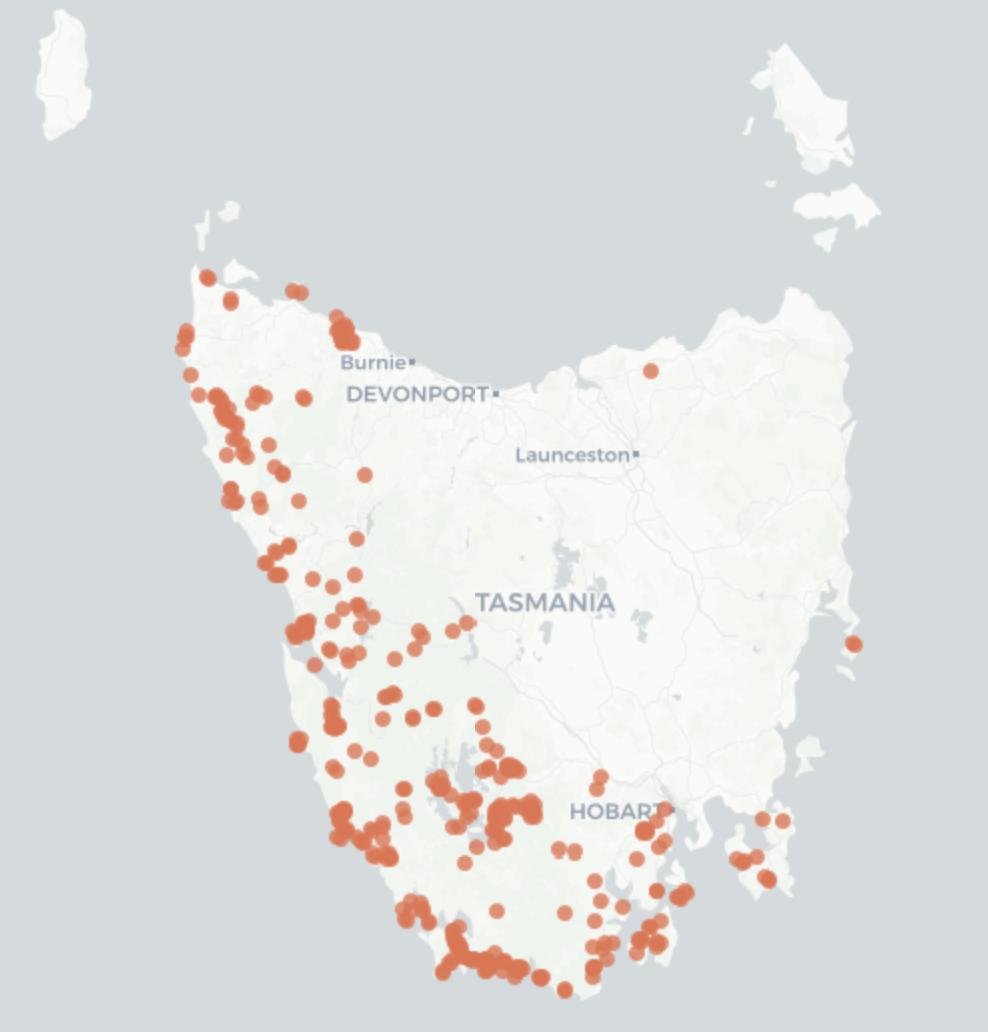
- Distribution of Chordifex hookeri Atlas of Living Australia, Map data © OpenStreetMap, imagery © CartoDB

Synonyms
- Acion hookeri (D.I.Morris) B.G.Briggs & L.A.S.Johnson; Restio hookeri D.I. Morris in M.R. Banks et al. (eds)

= Chordifex hookeri =

Species of flowering plant

Chordifex hookeri is commonly known as woolly buttonrush or cord-rush. It is a rush species of the genus Chordifex in the family Restionaceae. The species is endemic to Tasmania.

== Description ==
Chordifex hookeri has a rhizome horizontally to 0.2 metres (7.9 in) with a diameter to 6 mm., with hairy internodes and broad scales. The leaves are reduced to scales with sheath at the stem. The sheaths are up to 20 mm long loosely grasping below spreading to the upper half. The sheaths are short apex obtuse and bluntly mucronate with woolly hairs. The culm is approximately 0.50 mm with a diameter of 0.75-1.75 mm.

Chordifex hookeri has a raceme inflorescence, where the flower has been reduced to a solitary spikelet or panicle. These are ovoid to subspherical. The male spikelet is 7.58 mm long with several flowers while the female spikelet is 6–7 mm long with a few flowers. The male flower have 3 stamens with anthers at about 2 mm. The female flower has 3 staminodes at 2,5 mm long which are joined at the base. Glumes are empty with a length of 3-5mm and woolly-hairy at the apex. Flowers are compressed to 6 perianth segmented with leaves as lanceolate-elliptic. The capsule is 3 mm long with a 2-locular, dehiscent along the thicken margins.

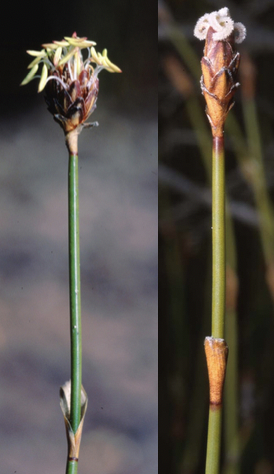
Male (left) and female (right) specimen

== Distribution ==
Chordifex hookeri is endemic to Tasmania. It is found it mainly found in the South West of Tasmania, such as the Southwest National Park and the Southwest Conservation Area, where it is abundant and widely distributed. It can also be seen along the west coast stretching to the far north.

== Habitat ==
Chordifex hookeri is a native herb commonly found in infertile poorly-drained acid peaty soil, which are thin or skeletal. It grows on a range of substrates, including dolerite, basalt, alluvium and quartzite gravels, but most commonly on siliceous substrates. It is limited by nutrients and frequent fires control the vegetation. This inhibits larger scrubs and forest to grow and prolongs succession. The annually precipitation is high.

Chordifex hookeri is found in buttongrass moorlands, low land sedgelands and restionaceae rushland from near-sea level to about 1000m. In Mt. Sprent it is found at 620m altitude in Buttongrass and alpine moorland. In buttongrass moorland it is found in the understory as a part of the sedge layer and is a dominant species on slopes. In restionaceae rushland Chordifex hookeri is a dominant species, it grows in deep peat soil across a range of infertile substrates. Chordifex hookeri is dominating in western lowland sedgeland where it grows in siliceous gravel on infertile soil.
