= Flatbergium =

Scientific classification
- Kingdom: Plantae
- Division: Bryophyta
- Class: Sphagnopsida
- Order: Sphagnales
- Family: Flatbergiaceae; A.J.Shaw
- Genus: Flatbergium; A.J.Shaw

Species
- F. sericeum F. novo-caledoniae

Synonyms
- Isocladus Lindb.

Genus of mosses

Flatbergium is a genus of moss with two accepted species. Flatbergium sericeum and Flatbergium novo-caledoniae, originally described as species of Sphagnum, are now considered part of this separate genus on the basis of genetic differences.
