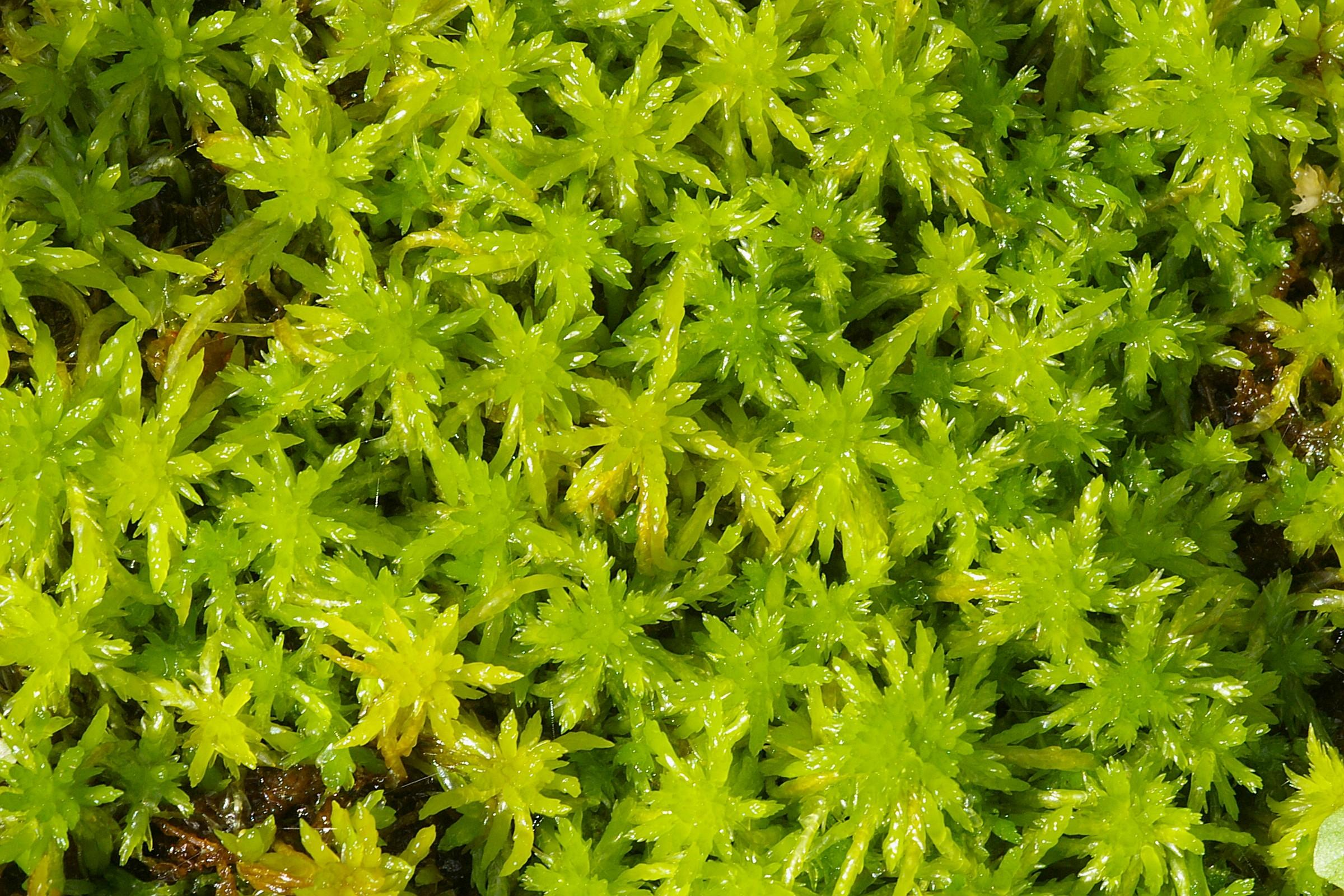
- A clump of Sphagnum, peat moss

Scientific classification
- Kingdom: Plantae
- Division: Bryophyta
- Class: Sphagnopsida
- Subclass: Sphagnidae
- Order: Sphagnales; Limpr.

Families
- Ambuchananiaceae; Flatbergiaceae; Sphagnaceae

= Sphagnales =

Peat moss Temporal range: Triassic to recent

Order of mosses

The Sphagnales is an order of mosses with four living genera: Ambuchanania, Eosphagnum, Flatbergium, and Sphagnum.
The genus Sphagnum contains the largest number of species currently discovered (about 200, number varying according to the various authors). The other genera are currently limited to one species each.
