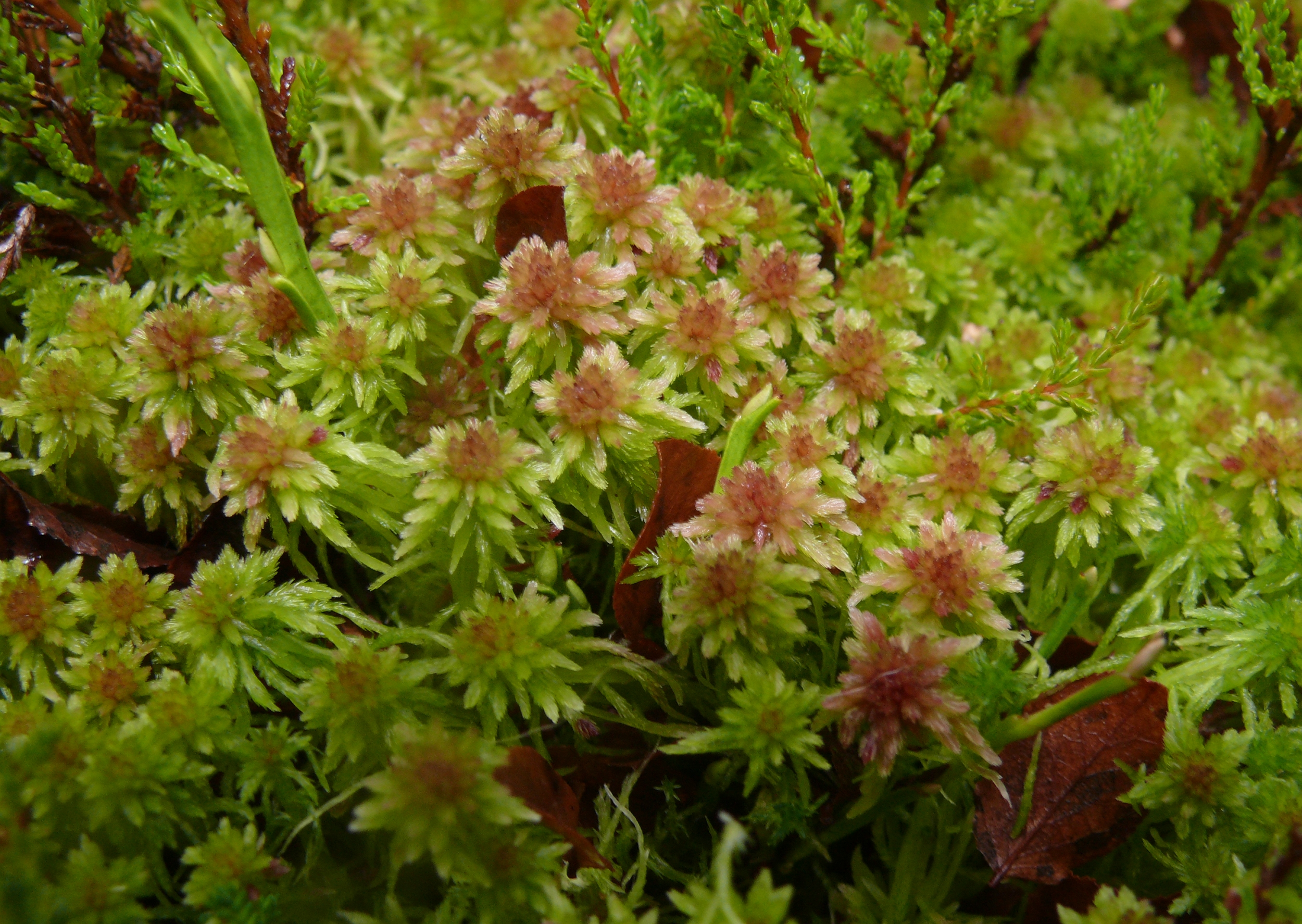
- A clump of Sphagnum, peat moss

Scientific classification
- Kingdom: Plantae
- Division: Bryophyta
- Subdivision: Sphagnophytina
- Class: Sphagnopsida; Ochyra

Orders
- †Protosphagnales; Sphagnales

= Sphagnopsida =

Sphagnopsida Temporal range: Permian to present

Subclass of mosses

Sphagnopsida is a class of mosses that includes a single subclass Sphagnidae, with two orders. It is estimated it originated about 465 million years ago, along with Takakia. The order Sphagnales contains four living genera: Ambuchanania, Eosphagnum, and Flatbergium, which counts four species in total, and Sphagnum which contains the rest of the species. The extinct Protosphagnales contains a single fossil species.

class Sphagnopsida

order Protosphagnales †
order Sphagnales

family Ambuchananiaceae
family Flatbergiaceae
family Sphagnaceae

- - Takakiopsida
  - Sphagnopsida
  - - - Andreaeopsida
      - Andreaeobryopsida
      - - Oedipodiopsida
        - - Tetraphidopsida
          - Polytrichopsida
          - Bryopsida

The phylogenetic position of the Sphagnopsida among the eight classes of mosses, based on inferences from DNA sequence data.
