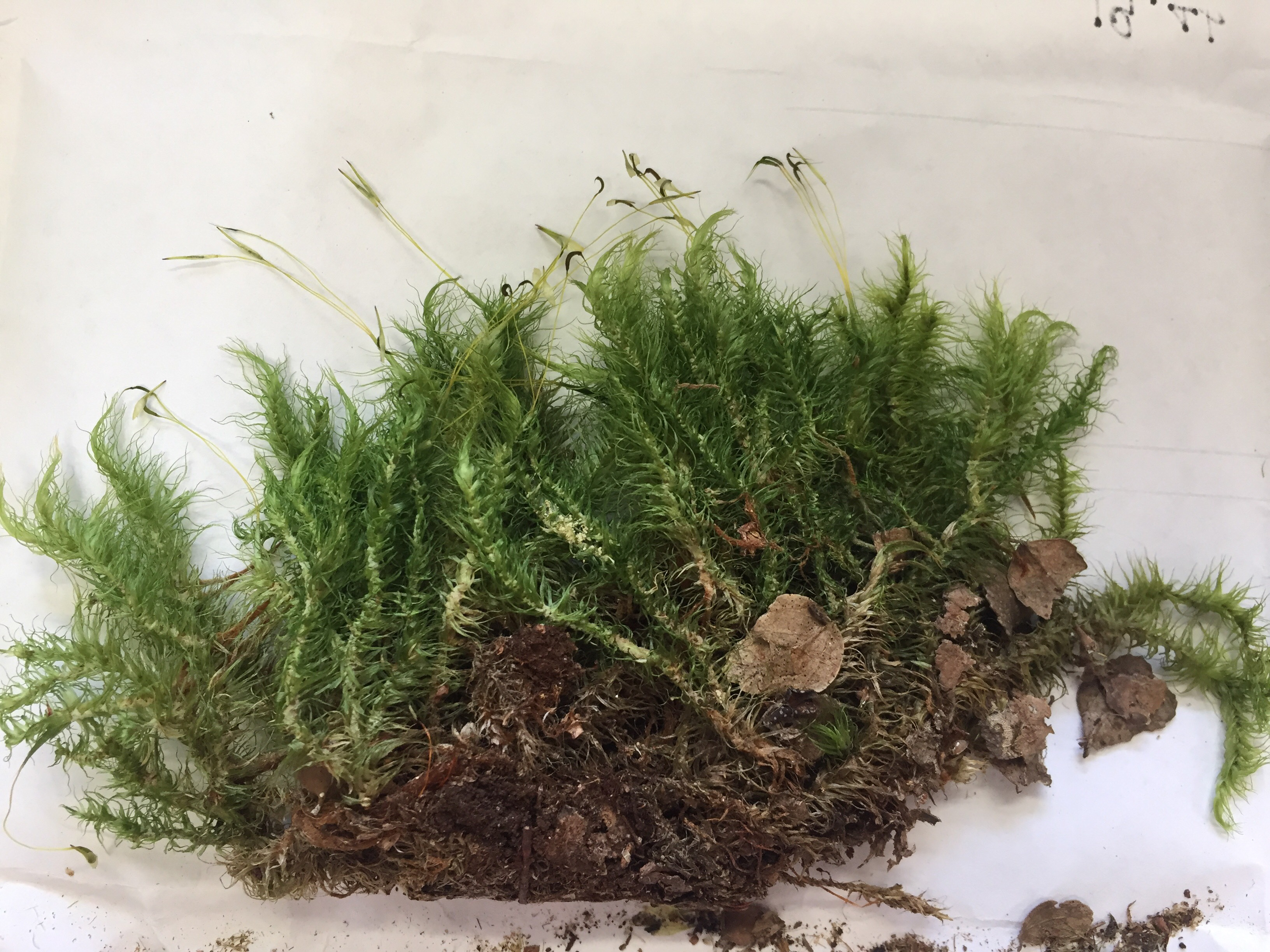
- A collected specimen

Scientific classification
- Kingdom: Plantae
- Division: Bryophyta
- Class: Bryopsida
- Subclass: Dicranidae
- Order: Dicranales
- Family: Dicranaceae
- Genus: Dicranoloma
- Species: D. dicarpum

Binomial name
- Dicranoloma dicarpum (Nees) Paris

= Dicranoloma dicarpum =

Species of plant

Dicranoloma dicarpum is relatively common moss which is widespread in the Southern Hemisphere. The genus Dicranoloma has 40 species, which share the features of long stems, wispy and twisted leaves, and large, erect capsules. The genus is dominant in wet forest habitats in Australia and New Zealand.

== Etymology ==
‘Dicran’, for the similarity to the Northern hemisphere genus Dicranum. The suffix ‘-loma’ means border, and refers to a layer of elongate cells along the leaf margins of Dicranoloma, which distinguishes this genus from Dicranum mosses. The word ‘dicarpum’ was coined by German botanist Nees von Esenbeck, and refers to the multiple sporophytes produced from one perichaetium.

== Description ==
Dicranoloma dicarpum plants are dull to bright green in colour, growing to form cushions or tufts. Stems are often branched, and range from 0.5-7.5 cm tall.

The leaves are 3.0-12.4 mm long and 0.5-0.16 mm wide. They are falcate (curved into a sickle shape), spirally twisted, and taper to a pointed tip. There is strong serration along the margins of the leaf tip, although a hand lens is usually required to see this. The leaves are also strongly plicate (folded along an axis) on either side of a central nerve (midrib) running length-wise through the leaf. The deepness of this pleating helps differentiate D. dicarpum from other Dicranoloma species.

Another distinguishing feature is aggregated sporophytes, with 1-10 capsules produced from a single perichaetium (see Figure 2). Setae are light brown and project 0.5-1.0 cm above the perichaetium. Perichaetial leaves are strongly tapered, and grow to about a quarter of the length of the seta. Capsules are cylindrical, smooth and narrow, and grow 3–3.5 mm in length.

At a cellular level, D. dicarpum can be identified by a region of short, square cells beside the nerve in the mid-region of the leaf, with cells becoming longer closer to the leaf margins.

== Ecology and distribution ==
D. dicarpum lives in wet forest between sea level and 1550 metres. It grows on a variety of substrates including logs, rocks, tree bases and stumps, leaf litter or soil. It is found in Australia, New Zealand, Peru, China, Japan, Malaysia, Indonesia, New Guinea, Taiwan, and Vanuatu.

There is considerable variation in the plant's morphology across its geographical range. For example, specimens from southern Australia (Tasmania and Victoria) and New Zealand typically have more setae per perichaetium and longer leaves compared to specimens from northern Australia (New South Wales and Queensland) or other warmer regions.
