= Dicranum viride =

Scientific classification
- Kingdom: Plantae
- Division: Bryophyta
- Class: Bryopsida
- Subclass: Dicranidae
- Order: Dicranales
- Family: Dicranaceae
- Genus: Dicranum
- Species: D. viride

Binomial name
- Dicranum viride Lindberg, 1863

Species of moss

Dicranum viride is a species of moss belonging to the family Dicranaceae.

It is native to Northern Hemisphere, including Japan.
