= Dicranum leioneuron =

Scientific classification
- Kingdom: Plantae
- Division: Bryophyta
- Class: Bryopsida
- Subclass: Dicranidae
- Order: Dicranales
- Family: Dicranaceae
- Genus: Dicranum
- Species: D. leioneuron

Binomial name
- Dicranum leioneuron Kindberg

Species of moss

Dicranum leioneuron is a species of moss belonging to the family Dicranaceae.

It is native to Northern Hemisphere.
