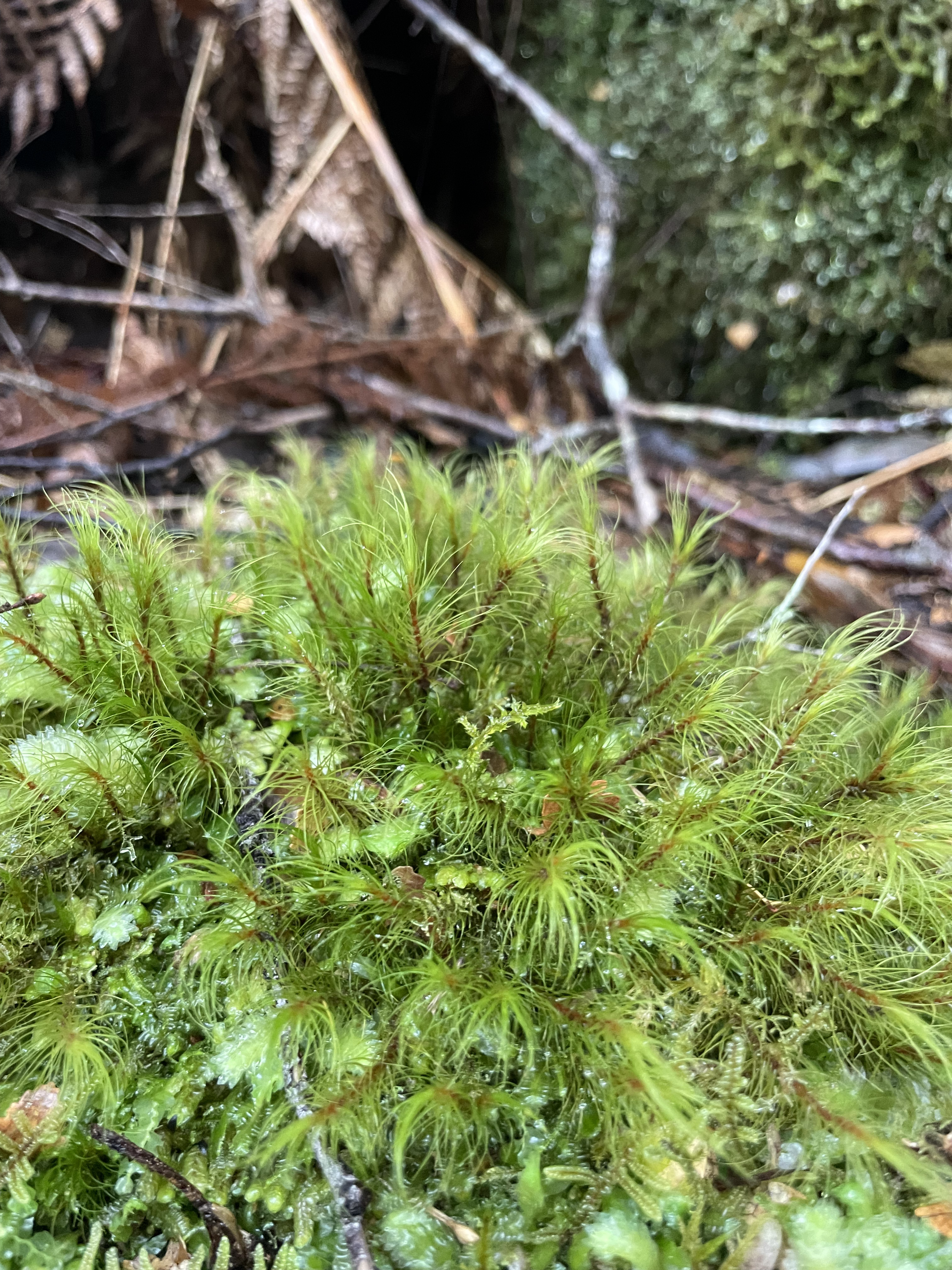
- Dicranoloma menziesii

Scientific classification
- Kingdom: Plantae
- Division: Bryophyta
- Class: Bryopsida
- Subclass: Dicranidae
- Order: Dicranales
- Family: Dicranaceae
- Genus: Dicranoloma
- Species: D. menziesii

Binomial name
- Dicranoloma menziesii (Taylor) Renaud
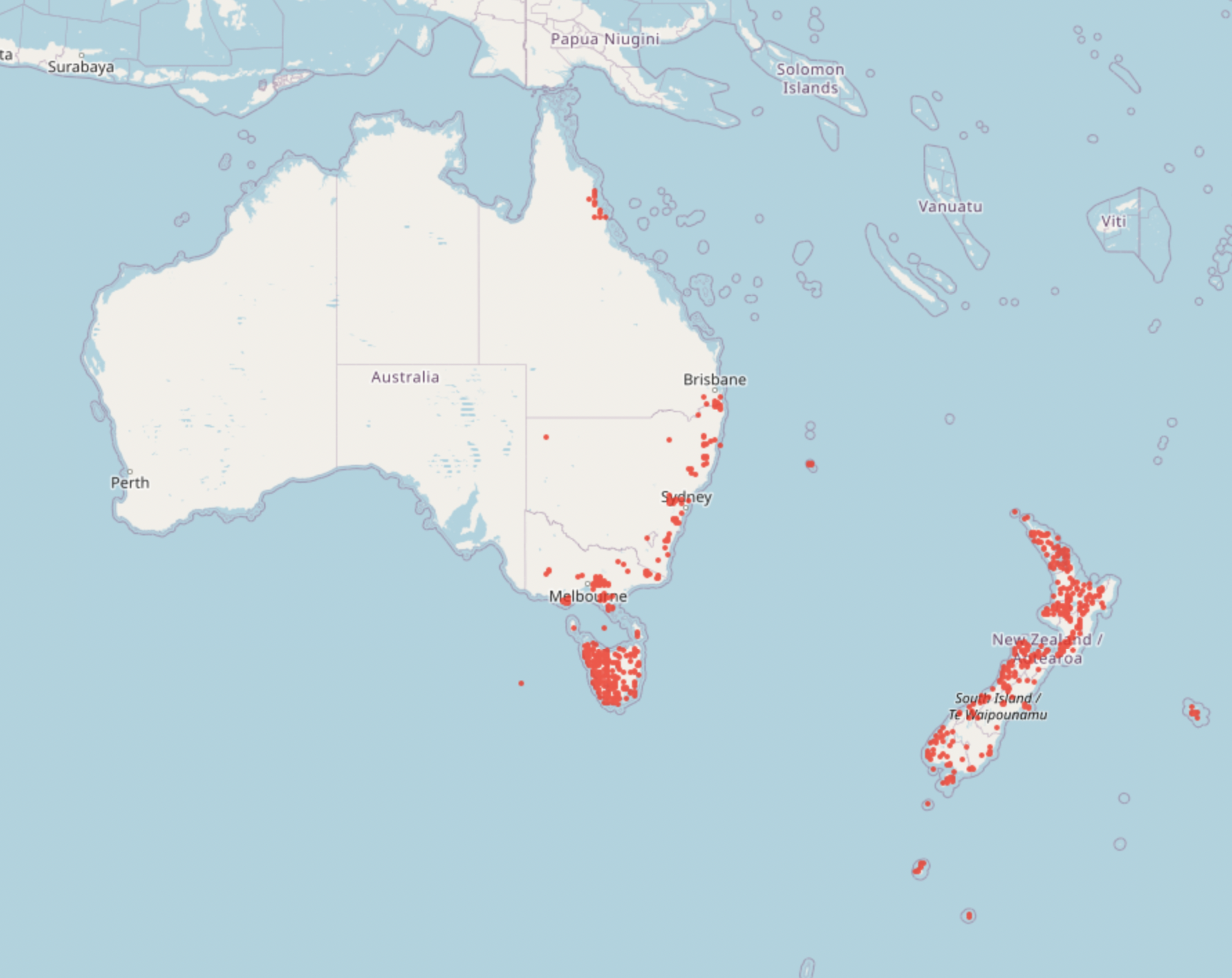
- Distribution of D. menziesii in Australia and New Zealand

= Dicranoloma menziesii =

Species of plant

Dicranoloma menziesii is a dioicous epiphytic species of moss in the family Dicranaceae. The genus Dicranoloma contains 40 species, with many shared characteristics such as long stems, leaves with a fluffy, "feather-like" appearance and cylindrical capsules produced from a perichaetium. It is native to Australia where it can be found in Queensland, New South Wales, Victoria, Tasmania and Lord Howe Island. It also occurs in New Zealand and on the Juan Fernandez Islands off the coast of Chile.

== Habitat, distribution and ecology ==
Dicranoloma menziesii can be found growing as loose turfs or clumps in mostly wet forests at altitudes up to approximately 1,550 m (5,090 ft) on tree stumps, rocks, logs and lower tree bases and stems. It occurs throughout eastern Queensland, is widespread along the coastal of New South Wales into Victoria and is widespread throughout much of Tasmania and King Island. The species is also widespread throughout New Zealand and many surrounding islands. Within a certain locality, it may exhibit a light form or a dark form, with some intermediate forms common. The lighter form has fewer chloroplasts than the darker form and tends to grow in more exposed habitats.

Many bryophyte species, such as D. menziesii are important pioneers on bare surfaces, converting unfavourable substrates into ones suitable for seedling germination. This action is critical for the regeneration of some vascular plant species or communities, particularly in habitats whereby herbivory on the forest floor or unsuitable light conditions prevent the establishment of seedlings. Furthermore, bryophytes can act like sponges, absorbing water directly through their leaves and holding large quantities of water by surface tension among their leaves and fine shoots. Their presence also reduces soil erosion and the evaporation of water from the soil, which helps to maintain a stable environment for other organisms.

== Description ==
Plants are small to robust, ranging from 2.5–10 cm (1.0–3.9 in) tall. They are yellowish to dark green in colour, forming tufts or cushions on substrates. Rhizoids are pale brown to white with a central stand present. The leaves are thin, long and falcate-secund or wide-spread forming a bristle-like structure on the tip. The upper half of the leaf consists primarily of the leaf nerve which extends past the tip and has only one to three cell rows of lamina, however these cells are distinctive and isometric. The epidermis is differentiated abaxially and adaxially with distinct luminal cells. The costa distinguishes Dicranoloma menziesii from other closely related species as it is broad and occupies almost the entire width of the median and upper parts of the leaf. Additionally, the setae is rather short at 10 mm (3/8 in) long or less. The capsules are cylindrical and may be slightly curved and the seta range from 4.5–8 mm (3/16–5/16 in) long. Capsules are exceeded by some vegetative or perichaetial leaves. Peristome teeth are asymmetrically bifid and one to two sporogones develop per perichaetium.

== Taxonomy ==
The taxonomic authority is given to (Taylor) Renauld who first identified and described D. menziesii in 1901 and all species from Dicranoloma were later revised by bryologist Niels Klazenga in 2003.

Within the genus Dicranoloma, there are 40 species and is the largest genus of Dicranaceae in Australia with many species forming an important component of moss-dominated communities in wet forests. Dicranoloma menziesii has the closest evolutionary relationship to Braunfelsia dicranoides, despite being a different genus and differing in their distributions. It is also closely related to Dicranoloma blumei and Dicranoloma billardieri.

The phylogenetic distinction between genus Dicranoloma and genus Dicranum has been long-debated and it has been suggested that all New Zealand members of Dicranoloma would be better suited to the genus Dicranum because of their similar morphological characteristics. However, phylogenetic analysis of chloroplasts revealed that the two genera are separate lineages and Dicranoloma can be distinguished from Dicranum because the latter has the presence of a hyaline border within many of its species, in addition to an entirely 1-stratose alar patch which is almost always bitratose in some Malesian species. The very broad costa is a distinguishing feature of D. menziesii compared to other Dicranoloma species.
