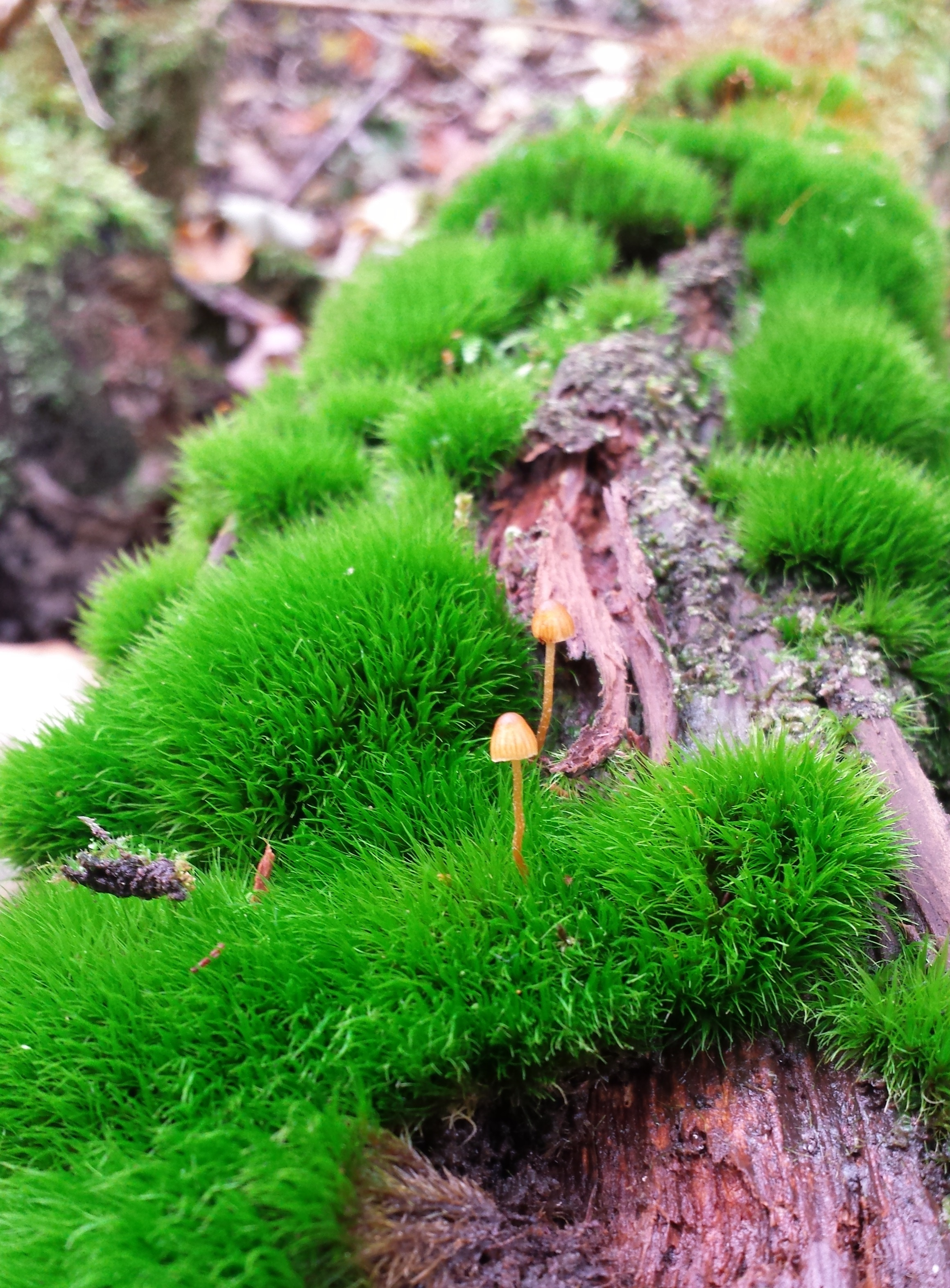

Scientific classification
- Kingdom: Plantae
- Division: Bryophyta
- Class: Bryopsida
- Subclass: Dicranidae
- Order: Dicranales
- Family: Dicranaceae
- Genus: Dicranum
- Species: D. tauricum

Binomial name
- Dicranum tauricum Sapjegin

Synonyms
- Dicranum strictum

= Dicranum tauricum =

Species of plant

Dicranum tauricum is a species of fork moss in the family Dicranaceae. It is a native to western North America and has been introduced to Europe. The male plants are the same size as the females. They can be found in lowland forests on rotting logs or tree stumps.
