= Cnestrum =

Cnestrum may refer to:

- Cnestrum (fly), a genus of flies in the family Ephydridae
- Cnestrum (plant), a genus of mosses in the family Dicranaceae
