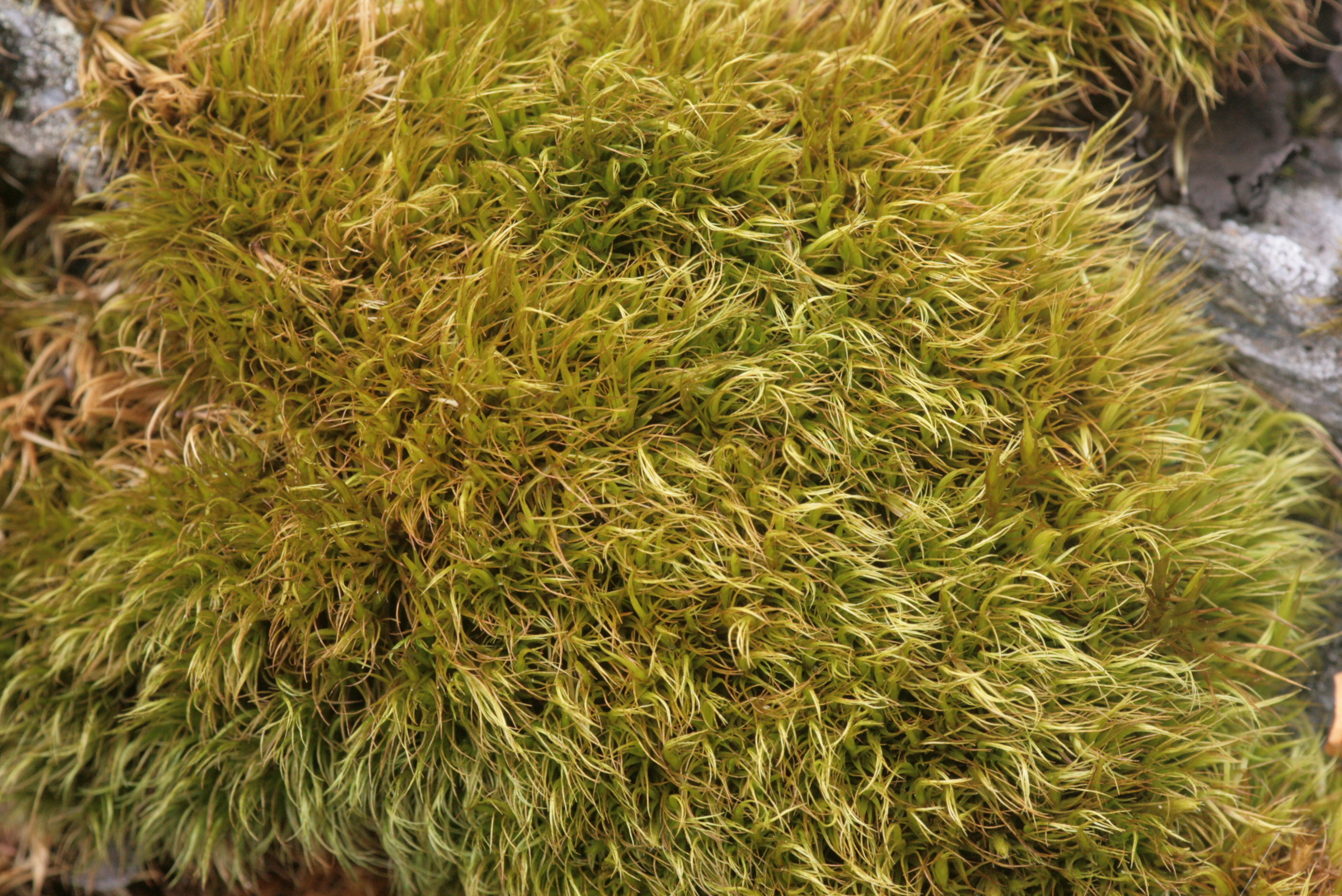

Scientific classification
- Kingdom: Plantae
- Division: Bryophyta
- Class: Bryopsida
- Subclass: Dicranidae
- Order: Dicranales
- Family: Dicranaceae
- Genus: Paraleucobryum
- Species: P. longifolium

Binomial name
- Paraleucobryum longifolium Loeske

= Paraleucobryum longifolium =

Species of moss

Paraleucobryum longifolium is a species of moss belonging to the family Dicranaceae.

It has almost cosmopolitan distribution.
