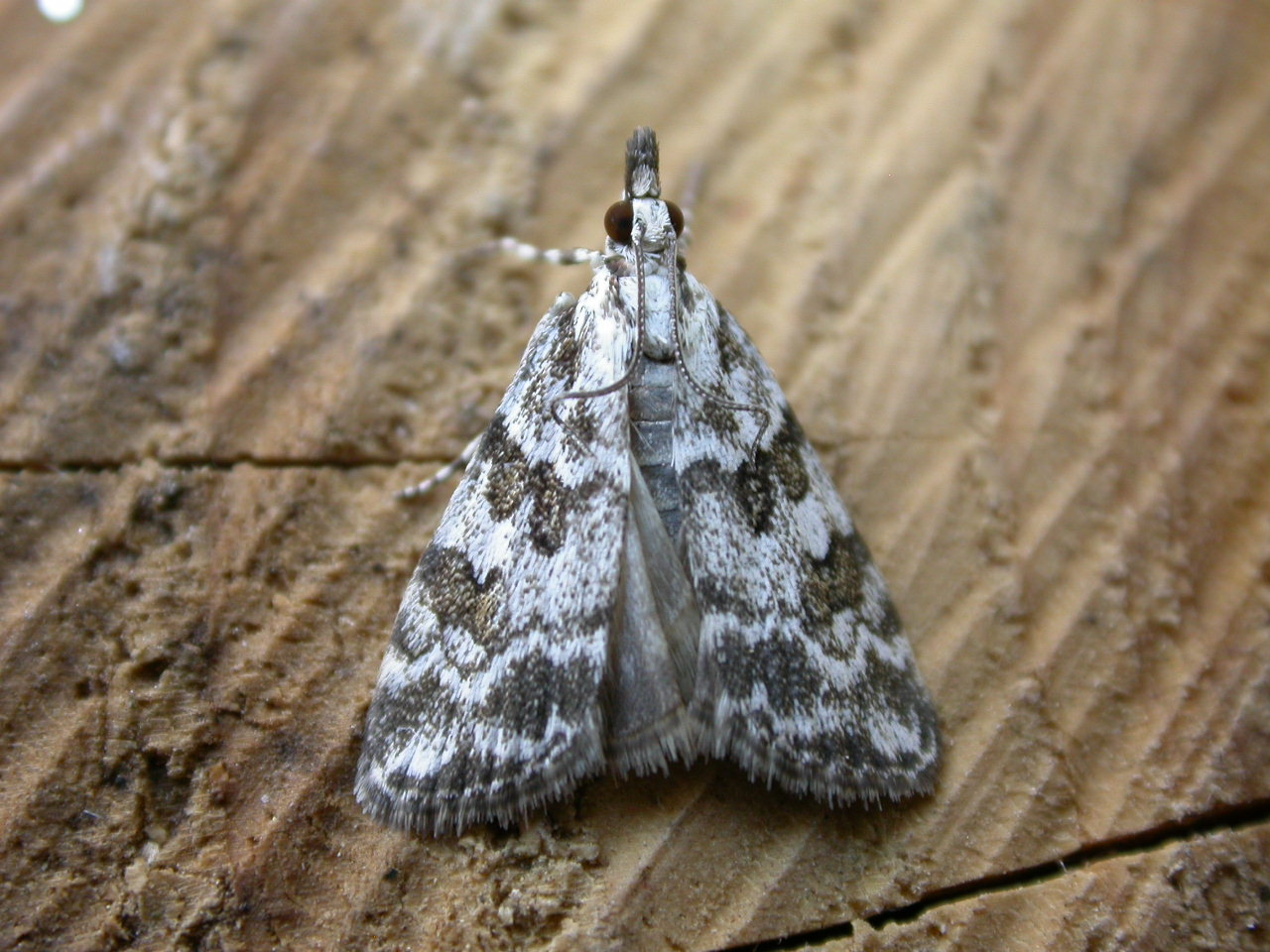

Scientific classification
- Kingdom: Animalia
- Phylum: Arthropoda
- Class: Insecta
- Order: Lepidoptera
- Family: Crambidae
- Genus: Scoparia
- Species: S. pyralella

Binomial name
- Scoparia pyralella (Denis & Schiffermüller, 1775)

Synonyms
- Tinea pyralella Denis & Schiffermüller, 1775; Eudorea tristrigella Stephens, 1834; Scoparia pyralella klimeschi Leraut, 1981; Phalaena arundinata Thunberg, 1792; Pyralis dubitalis Hübner, 1796; Scoparia dubitalis ab. alba Tutt, 1899; Scoparia dubitalis ab. inspersella Galvagni, 1920; Scoparia dubitalis f. australis Müller-Rutz, 1920; Scoparia dubitalis var. ivanalis Krulikovsky, 1909; Scoparia dubitalis var. purbeckensis E. R. Bankes, 1889; Scoparia ingratella vesubiella Marion, 1976

= Scoparia pyralella =

Species of moth

Scoparia pyralella, the meadow grey, is a species of moth of the family Crambidae. It was first described by Michael Denis and Ignaz Schiffermüller in 1775.

== Distribution ==
This species can be found in most of Europe. It is quite common over most of Britain. It inhabits fields and forests.

== Description ==
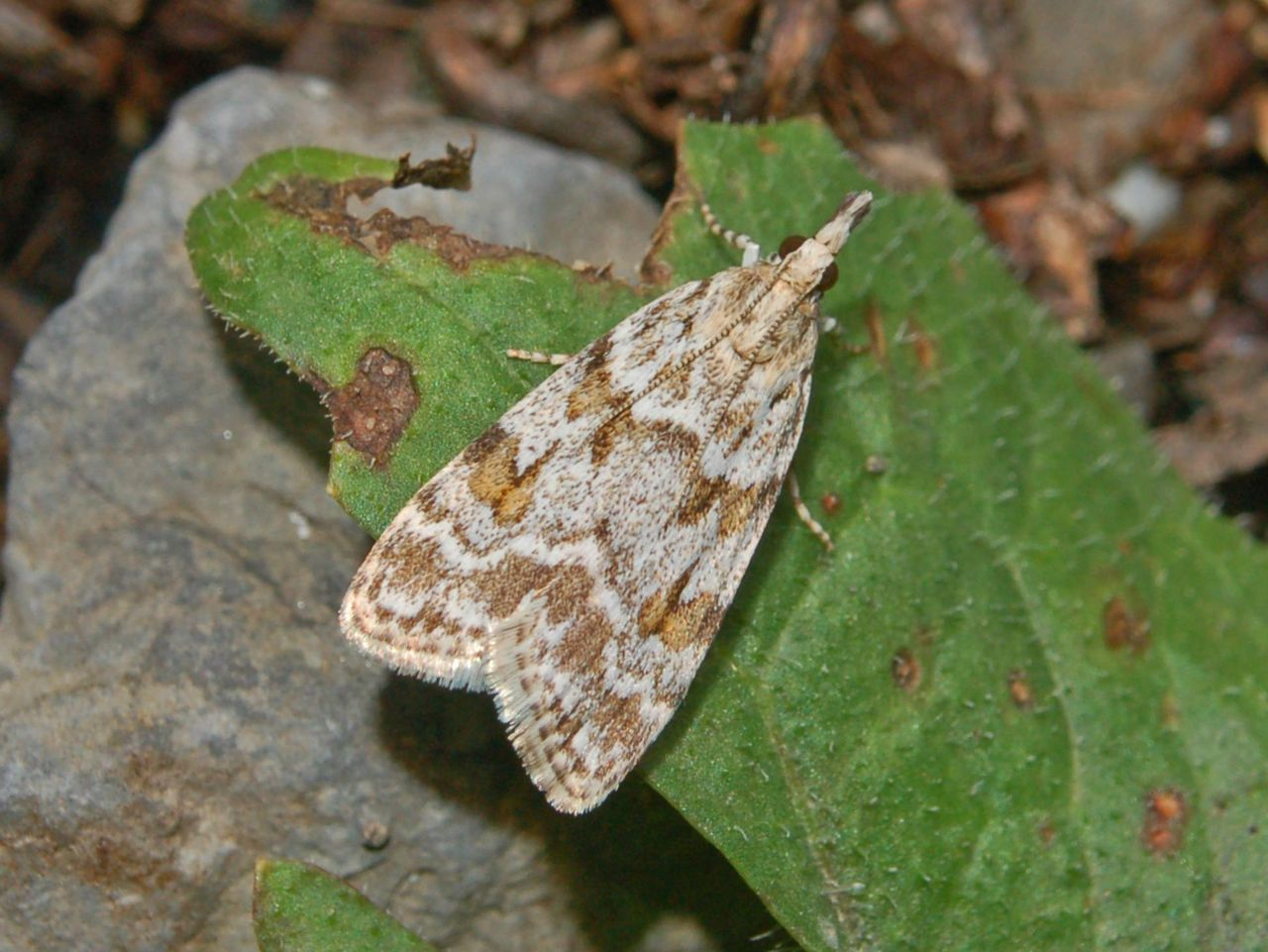

Scoparia pyralella has a wingspan of 17–20 mm. These small moths have pale brown or whitish forewings with darker brown markings and transversal white lines. Hindwings are whitish Meyrick describes it -The forewings are white, more or less sprinkled with dark fuscous; a black ochreous- mixed mark from base of costa; lines white, dark-edged, first rather irregular, second slightly angulate-sinuate above middle; round orbicular, and narrow oval claviform yellow - ochreous, edged with dark fnscous, resting on first line; discal spot large, 8 -shaped, yellow -ochreous, dark -margined, touching costa above, and second line beneath; terminal area dark fuscous, subterminal line white, irregular. Hindwings are ochreous-whitish, terminally suffused with grey.

This species is rather similar to Scoparia ambigualis, Scoparia ancipitella, Scoparia basistrigalis, Scoparia subfusca, Eudonia lineola and Eudonia murana.

== Biology ==
The moths fly from June to July, depending on the location. They are active mainly at dusk and night. The larvae feed on decaying leaves of various low-growing plants and perhaps on the roots of Senecio jacobaea.

== Bibliography ==
- Corley, M. F. V., Marabuto, E., & Pires, P. – 2007 - New Lepidoptera for the fauna of Portugal (Insecta: Lepidoptera). - SHILAP Revista de Lepidopterologia 35(139), 321-334.
- Heckford, R. J. (2011): A note on the larva of Scoparia pyralella ([Denis & Schiffermüller], 1775) (Lepidoptera: Pyralidae). Entomologist's Gazette 62: 1-6
- Ivinskis, P. – 1993 - Check-list of Lithuanian Lepidoptera - Vilnius, 210 pp.
- Martin, M.O. 1986 - Family Pyralidae - Pyralid moths -in: G. S. Medvedev (ed.), Keys to the Insects of the European Part of the USSR 4 (3): 232-244.
