= Mitrobryum koelzii =

Conservation status
- Endangered (IUCN 2.3)

Scientific classification
- Kingdom: Plantae
- Division: Bryophyta
- Class: Bryopsida
- Subclass: Dicranidae
- Order: Dicranales
- Family: Dicranaceae
- Genus: Mitrobryum
- Species: M. koelzii

Binomial name
- Mitrobryum koelzii H.Rob.

Species of moss

Mitrobryum koelzii is a species of moss in the family Dicranaceae. It is endemic to India, where it is known from only two sites in Uttar Pradesh. It is an endangered species that is threatened by human activity in its mountain forest habitat.
