= Arctoa =

Scientific classification
- Kingdom: Plantae
- Division: Bryophyta
- Class: Bryopsida
- Subclass: Dicranidae
- Order: Dicranales
- Family: Dicranaceae
- Genus: Arctoa; Bruch & Schimp.

Genus of mosses

Arctoa is a genus of mosses belonging to the family Dicranaceae. The species of the genus are found in Europe and America.

== Species ==
The following species are recognised in the genus Arctoa:

- Arctoa anderssonii Wich.
- Arctoa blyttii (Bruch & Schimp.) Loeske
- Arctoa fulvella (Dicks.) Bruch & Schimp.
- Arctoa glacialis (Berggr.) Fedosov, Jan Kučera & M. Stech
- Arctoa hyperborea (Gunnerus ex Dicks.) Bruch & Schimp.
- Arctoa pumila (Mitt.) Fedosov, Jan Kučera & M. Stech
- Arctoa schistioides (Broth. ex Ihsiba) Ihsiba
- Arctoa spenceri (Dixon & Sainsbury) Fedosov, Brinda & M. Stech
- Arctoa starkei (F. Weber & D. Mohr) Loeske
