= Dicranum drummondii =

Scientific classification
- Kingdom: Plantae
- Division: Bryophyta
- Class: Bryopsida
- Subclass: Dicranidae
- Order: Dicranales
- Family: Dicranaceae
- Genus: Dicranum
- Species: D. drummondii

Binomial name
- Dicranum drummondii C.Müller, 1848

Species of moss

Dicranum drummondii is a species of moss belonging to the family Dicranaceae. It is native to Northern Hemisphere.

Dicranum drummondii, primarily an Eurasian species, was for years confused with the endemic North American species Dicranum ontariense. It was only in August 2000 that W. B. Schofield, S. S. Talbot, and S. L. Talbot made the first and only collection of the species, which was sterile, from Attu Island in the Aleutian Islands. The species is best recognized by its robust size. Distinguishing characters are the leaves in the distal part with round, oblong, somewhat rectangular cells with few pits.
