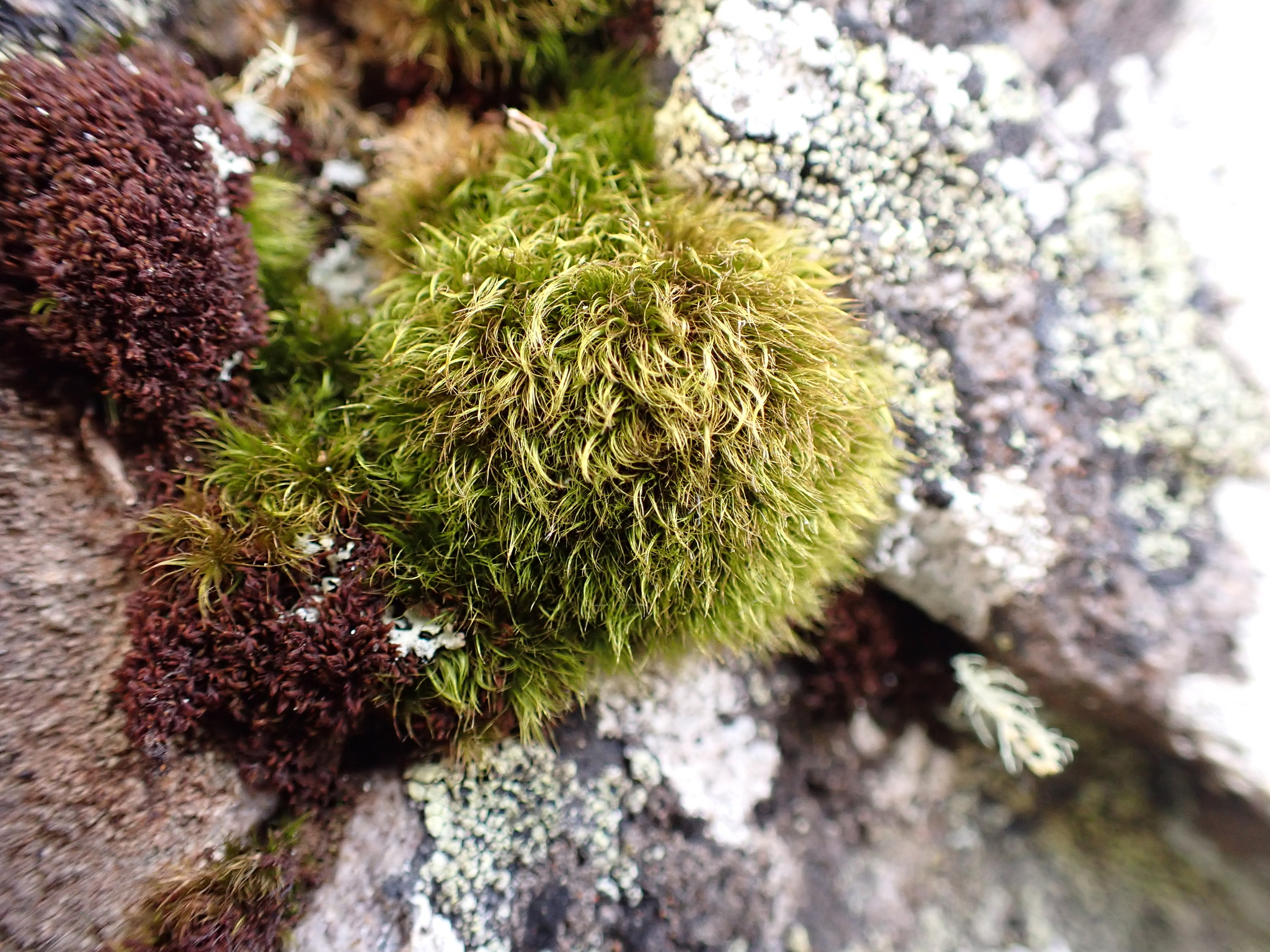

Scientific classification
- Kingdom: Plantae
- Division: Bryophyta
- Class: Bryopsida
- Subclass: Dicranidae
- Order: Dicranales
- Family: Dicranaceae
- Genus: Arctoa
- Species: A. pumila

Binomial name
- Arctoa pumila (Mitt.) Fedosov, Jan Kučera & M.Stech

Synonyms
- Symblepharis pumila Mitt.; Holodontium pumilum (Mitt.) Paris; Kiaeria pumila (Mitt.) Ochyra

= Arctoa pumila =

Species of moss

Arctoa pumila is a species of moss in the family Dicranaceae. It is recorded in New Zealand, and Tasmania and Victoria in Australia. Forming tufts, it grows in alpine and sub-alpine environments. The moss Kiaeria pumila (Mitt.) Ochyra was transferred to the genus Arctoa in 2021 creating the name Arctoa pumila.
