= Chorisodontium aciphyllum =

Scientific classification
- Kingdom: Plantae
- Division: Bryophyta
- Class: Bryopsida
- Subclass: Dicranidae
- Order: Dicranales
- Family: Dicranaceae
- Genus: Chorisodontium
- Species: C. aciphyllum

Binomial name
- Chorisodontium aciphyllum Brotherus (1924)

Species of moss

Chorisodontium aciphyllum is a species of moss found primarily on both sides of the Drake Passage. The species exhibits an extreme degree of cryptobiosis – the ability of a life form to enter a non-metabolic state, extending life indefinitely.

== Description ==
Chorisodontium aciphyllum grows in banks along the Antarctic coast in the Drake Passage region. It has also been found in Argentina, Chile, Antarctica, New Zealand, and South Georgia. As the moss banks grow taller, the layers more than an inch below the surface turn brown from lack of sun exposure and eventually become part of the permafrost. The mounds of moss can grow to be more than 9 feet (2.7 m) tall.

Chorisodontium aciphyllum was first described by Joseph Dalton Hooker and William M. Wilson in 1844 as Dicranum aciphyllum in the London Journal of Botany. Viktor Ferdinand Brotherus reclassified the species into its current genus in 1924.

== Cryptobiosis ==
In 2014, terrestrial ecologist Peter Convey and his colleagues from the British Antarctic Survey and the University of Reading discovered that C. aciphyllum remains viable after being frozen for more than 1,500 years. Samples of the moss were harvested from Signy Island in Antarctica using a coring drill and taken to the University of Reading for analysis. The 4.5-foot (1.4 m) core was cut into 8-inch (20 cm) sections and exposed to light and temperature levels common to the regions in which the moss grows naturally. After three to eight weeks, depending on sample, new growth was visible. Convey said contamination was not a plausible explanation for the observed growth because only clean saws were used and because C. aciphyllum does not produce spores in the Antarctic region. The deepest (oldest) sample was dated between 1,533 and 1,697 years old using radio-carbon dating techniques. The findings were published in Current Biology.

Previously, it was believed that a multi-cellular organism could only survive in a non-metabolic state of "suspended animation" known as cryptobiosis for a few decades. Cases of bacteria and other single-celled microbes were previously known. No moss had previously been documented to survive more than 20 years frozen, but moss stems frozen under Teardrop Glacier on Ellesmere Island for 400 years had spawned new growth when ground up and placed in petri dishes. Using complex cloning techniques, 31,000-year-old seeds of Silene stenophylla were revived in 2012.
