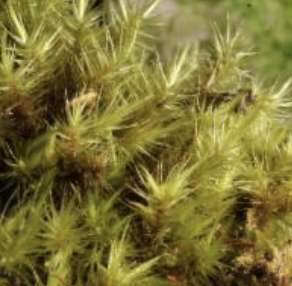

Scientific classification
- Kingdom: Plantae
- Division: Bryophyta
- Class: Bryopsida
- Subclass: Dicranidae
- Order: Dicranales
- Family: Dicranaceae
- Genus: Dicranoloma
- Species: D. billardierei

Binomial name
- Dicranoloma billardierei (Brid.) Paris
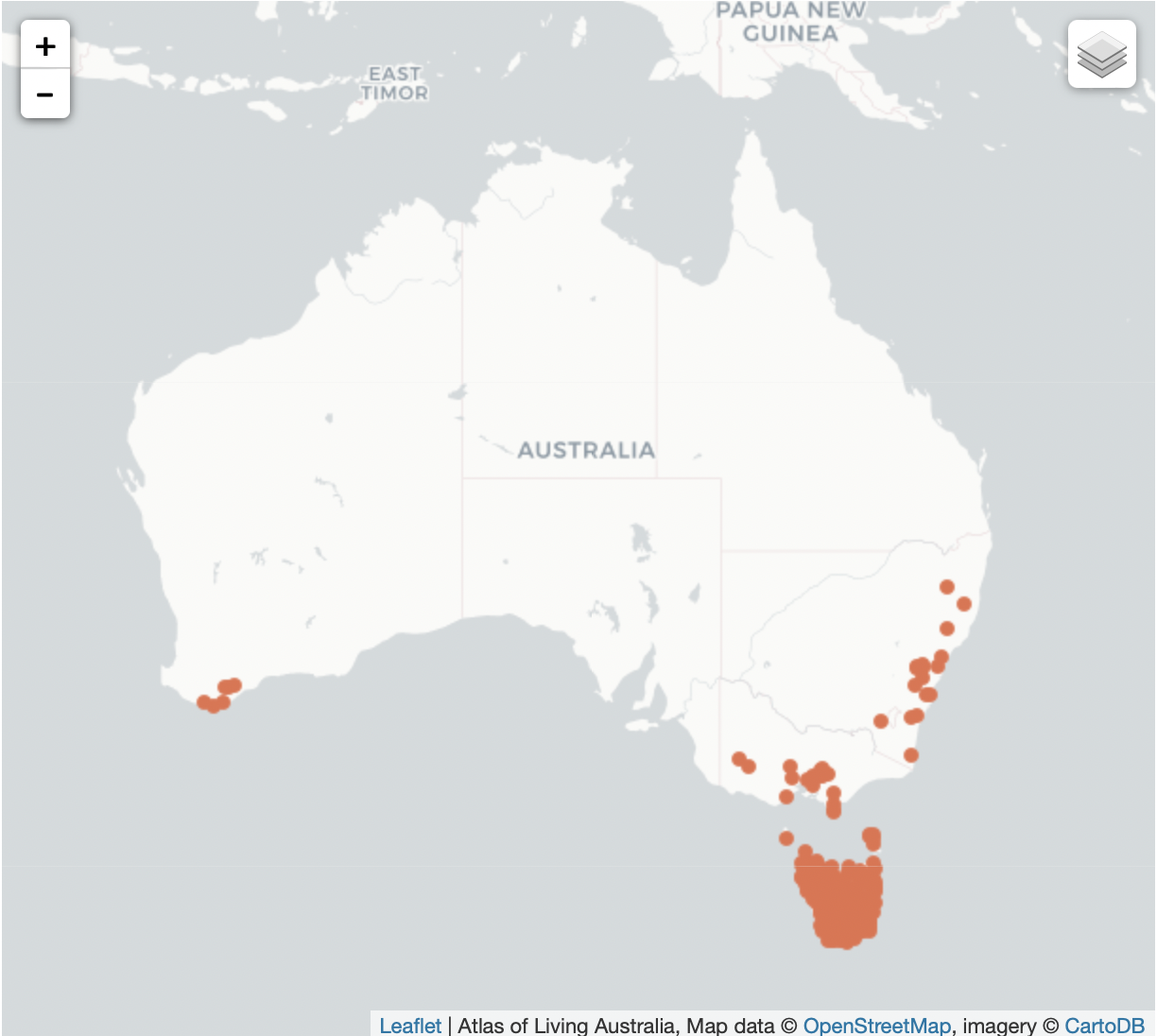
- Distribution Map From Atlas of Living Australia

= Dicranoloma billardierei =

Non-vascular plant

Dicranoloma billardierei is a species of bryophyte in the genus Dicranoloma. This moss is extremely common in wet rainforest habitats. In the field, Dicranoloma billardierei, is often confused with Dicranoloma robustum and Dicranoloma fasciatum. However, the short and obtuse nature of the leaves make this moss normally very distinctive.

== Description ==
Dicranoloma billardierei is a lustrous green or gold brown coloured plant that mostly forms cushions up to 80 cm (31 in) in diameter. The stems are branched by innovation and forking. The cross section has 3 to 4 layers of cortical cells and a central stand, with rhizoids in the leaf axils. The leaves are often twisted at the apex, falcate or erect spreading when fresh. The leaves are serrate or entire above and entire below with planes at margins. The mid laminal cells are elongate and irregular with elongate cells extending to apex. The border is well defined and extends from alar group to serrations. The cells that the base of the leaf are usually longer. The costa is narrow and wide in the middle of the leaf with the abaxial surface bearing short spines. There is normally one setae per perichaetium, the capsules are exserted and strongly curved. The operculum is curved and the calyptra is cucullate and smooth. Dicranoloma billarderi is very similar to Dicranoloma robustum but can be distinguished by the more untidy look of the leaves as well as the leaves generally being smaller. Dicranoloma billardierei is almost always paler and less yellow then Dicranoloma robustum. The cushions and stems, which are much branched and visible within the leaves, stems are often prostrate and the short leaves make this moss very distinctive. The obtuse nature of the leaves is readily observed under a hand lens and this can be distinctive of this species. Dicranoloma billardierei can also be confused with Dicranoloma fasciatum. However Dicranoloma billardierei will have serrate upper leaf margins compared to the spinose serrate margins of Dicranoloma fasciatum.

== Habitat and distribution ==
Dicranoloma billardierei lives in epiphytic and terrestrial environments. Generally growing on logs, stumps, exposed roots, soil or on rock. In terrestrial environments it is often found in well drained sites in a variety of forest and shrub types. It occurs in mixed broad leaf or southern beech forest on the forest floor and in New Zealand is often found within manuka scrub environments. This moss often forms a mosaic with Dicranoloma robustum and is found any from sea level up to approximately 1,250 m (4,100 ft).

== Reproduction ==
Dicranoloma billardierei normally consists of a main stem with multiple lateral branches and commonly at each apex a perichaetium was present. This perichaetium is a cluster of leaves surrounding the sex organs of the moss and forming an enveloping sheath. Archegonial, the female sex organs in plants, development began later then the male sex organ of plants, the antheridia. Maturation in archegonia takes around three months compared to antheridia which is about six to seven months. Maturation in antheridia means the sex organs are full size as the leaves surrounding the organs are ‘bulging’. Once fertilization of an archegonium occurs any further development is inhibited. As the haploid gamete fuse, the male gamete from the antheridium fertilizes the female, which results in a diploid spore forming plant forming known as sporophyte.

The internal of fertilization is between two and three months for Dicranoloma billardierei. These sporophytes increase their seta length and capsule size from march to July. By early spring the sporophytes have reached the operculum intact stage and sporophytes begin to rapidly develop. Once spore dispersal completes, the seta is the only evidence left of the sporophyte as the capsules disperse. Sporophyte maturation in Dicranoloma billardierei takes approximately twenty months. Compared to other species such as Dicranoloma menziesii, Dicranoloma billardierei produces relatively small abundance of sporophyte colonies. Sporophytes do not resume development until spores from the previous season have been released. This is because sporophytes rely on gametophyte during the early developmental stages. Waiting for the previous years spores to be released reduces the demand of the gametophyte for nutrition.

Dicranoloma billardierei had a seasonal pattern of sporophyte development and gametangial, the production of gametes in an organ or cell, development occurs multiple times throughout the year with some irregularity. This may a result of unpredictable conditions in the environment of the mosses. Gametophtyes in this species are able to support new sporophytes even with capsules from the previous year, as the sporophytes produce some of their own energy requirements. Dicranoloma billardierei antheridia development tends to occur later than other species like Dicranoloma menziesii and this may be because Dicranoloma billardierei typically occurs in decaying logs and in cool hallows that are protected by overhanging fronds. Reproductive cycle events may be influenced by environmental factors such as rainfall, light and temperature. They are also likely to be genetically controlled.

== Ecology ==
There are a wide variety of invertebrates associated with mosses and the moist environment they provide. Mosses conduct water externally, they are ectohydric, and also absorb water through much of their surface. They are also able to retain water for long time periods. In moss species such as Dicranoloma, water retention and uptake is enhanced through a covering of rhizoids on the stems and is also liked to growth form. Forms of life will also affect water retention. Invertebrates communities play an important role in the biodiversity within an ecosystem and in mosses. Mosses provide invertebrates camouflage, protection, shelter, food and a place to deposit their eggs. Mosses also benefits from the presence of invertebrates as these organisms may assist in sperm dispersal. Invertebrates such as mites are common on the stems of Dicranoloma, as well as species of Gastropa, Thysanoptera, and Coleoptera all of which feed on the moss. The remains of bacteria, algae, or dead and decaying material found within moss also likely provides a food sources for some species.
