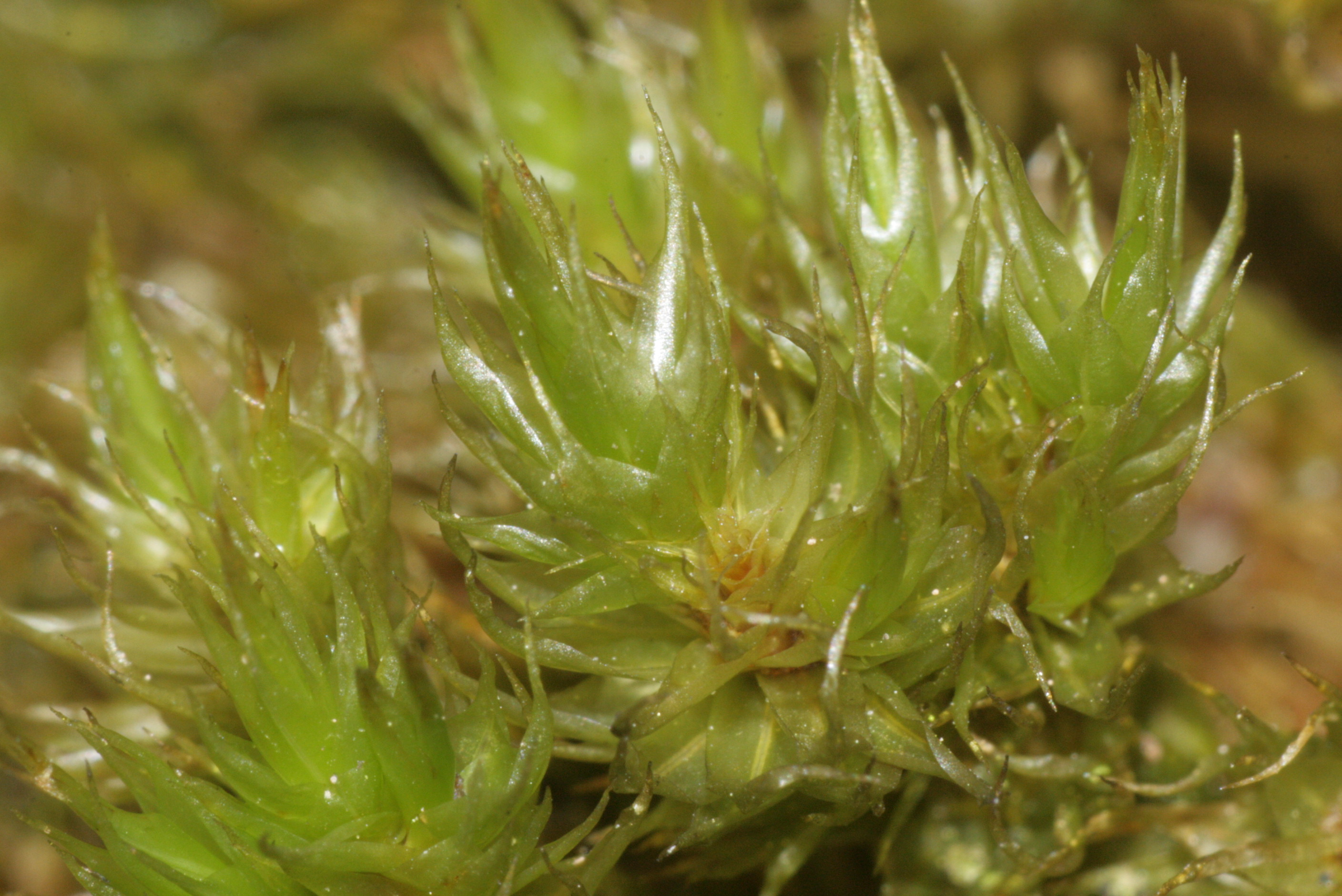

Scientific classification
- Kingdom: Plantae
- Division: Bryophyta
- Class: Bryopsida
- Subclass: Dicranidae
- Order: Dicranales
- Family: Dicranaceae
- Genus: Dicranum
- Species: D. spurium

Binomial name
- Dicranum spurium Hedw., 1801

= Dicranum spurium =

Species of moss

Dicranum spurium is a species of moss belonging to the family Dicranaceae.

It has almost cosmopolitan distribution.
