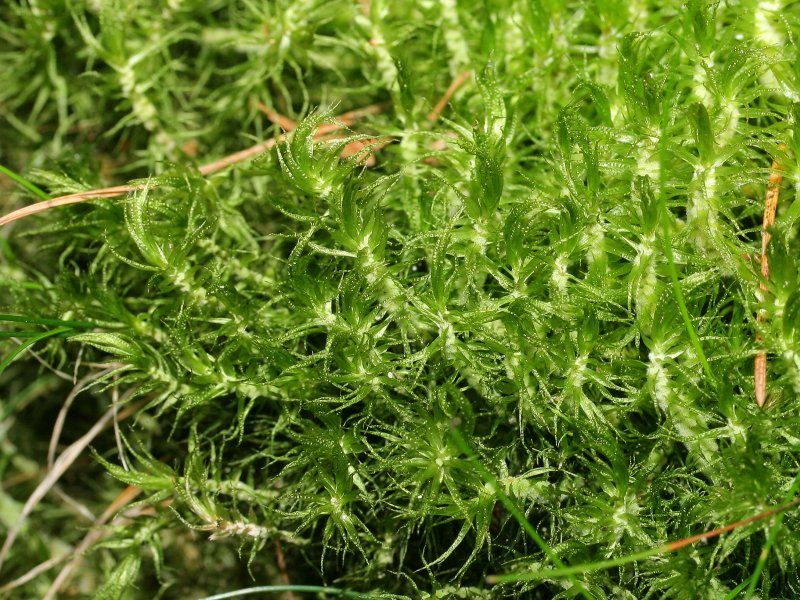
- Dicranum polysetum

Scientific classification
- Kingdom: Plantae
- Division: Bryophyta
- Class: Bryopsida
- Subclass: Dicranidae
- Order: Dicranales
- Family: Dicranaceae
- Genus: Dicranum

Species
- Dicranum acutifolium Dicranum angustum Dicranum bonjeanii Dicranum brevifolium Dicranum condensatum Dicranum elongatum Dicranum flagellare Dicranum fragilifolium Dicranum fulvum Dicranum fuscescens Dicranum groenlandicum Dicranum howellii Dicranum latifolium Dicranum leioneuron Dicranum majus Dicranum montanum Dicranum muehlenbeckii Dicranum ontariense Dicranum pallidisetum Dicranum polysetum Dicranum rhabdocarpum Dicranum scoparium Dicranum spadiceum Dicranum spurium Dicranum tauricum Dicranum undulatum Dicranum viride

= Dicranum =

Genus of mosses

Dicranum is a genus of mosses, also called wind-blown mosses or fork mosses. These mosses form in densely packed clumps. Stems may fork, but do not branch. In general, upright stems will be single but packed together. Dicranum is distributed globally. In North America these are commonly found in Jack pine or Red pine stands.

== List of Dicranum species ==
The genus Dicranum contains the following species according to World Flora Online:

- Dicranum acanthoneurum Müll. Hal.
- Dicranum acuminatum (Mitt.) Müll. Hal.
- Dicranum acutifolium (Lindb. & Arnell) C.E.O. Jensen
- Dicranum adianthoides (Hedw.) F. Weber & D. Mohr
- Dicranum africanum (Hedw.) F. Weber & D. Mohr
- Dicranum alpinum (P. Beauv.) Brid.
- Dicranum amoenevirens (Mitt.) Müll. Hal.
- Dicranum angustinerve Mitt.
- Dicranum antarcticum (Müll. Hal.) Mitt.
- Dicranum arcuatipes Müll. Hal.
- Dicranum arcuatum Brid.
- Dicranum areodictyon Müll. Hal.
- Dicranum arfakianum Müll. Hal. ex Geh.
- Dicranum argyrocaulon Müll. Hal.
- Dicranum armitii Müll. Hal.
- Dicranum asplenioides (Hedw.) F. Weber & D. Mohr
- Dicranum assamicum Dixon
- Dicranum atratum Geh.
- Dicranum aulacocarpum Mont.
- Dicranum aureonitens Müll. Hal.
- Dicranum australe Besch.
- Dicranum austrinum Mitt.
- Dicranum austro-alpinum Müll. Hal.
- Dicranum austro-congestum Müll. Hal.
- Dicranum austro-scoparium (Müll. Hal. ex Broth.) Müll. Hal.
- Dicranum baileyanum Müll. Hal.
- Dicranum bardunovii Tubanova & Ignatova
- Dicranum bartramianum B.H. Allen
- Dicranum bartramioides Broth.
- Dicranum bauerae Müll. Hal.
- Dicranum berteroanum Brid.
- Dicranum beyrichianum (Duby) Hampe
- Dicranum bicolor Hornsch. ex Müll. Hal.
- Dicranum billardierei Brid.
- Dicranum bipartitum (Dicks. ex With.) G. Roth ex Brid.
- Dicranum boivinianum (Besch.) Müll. Hal.
- Dicranum bonjeanii De Not. – crisped fork-moss
- Dicranum borbonicum Renauld & Cardot
- Dicranum brachysteleum Müll. Hal.
- Dicranum brasiliense Müll. Hal.
- Dicranum braunsiae Müll. Hal.
- Dicranum brevifolium (Lindb.) Lindb.
- Dicranum brevipilum (Bruch & Schimp.) Müll. Hal.
- Dicranum brunneum Müll. Hal.
- Dicranum bruntonii Sm.
- Dicranum bryoides (Hedw.) Sw.
- Dicranum caesium Mitt.
- Dicranum callistomum (Dicks. ex With.) Turner
- Dicranum calycinum (Hedw.) F. Weber & D. Mohr
- Dicranum cambouei (Renauld & Cardot) Müll. Hal.
- Dicranum campylophyllum Taylor
- Dicranum canariense Hampe ex Müll. Hal.
- Dicranum capillaceum Brid.
- Dicranum capillatus (Hook. & Wilson) L.C. Beck
- Dicranum cheoi E.B. Bartram
- Dicranum chilense De Not.
- Dicranum chloropus Brid.
- Dicranum circinatum Brid.
- Dicranum cirratum (Hedw.) Timm ex P. Gaertn., B. Mey. & Scherb.
- Dicranum clathratum Hook. f. & Wilson
- Dicranum clavatum R. Br.
- Dicranum columbiae (Kindb.) Renauld & Cardot
- Dicranum comosum Schwägr.
- Dicranum conanenum C. Gao
- Dicranum condensatum Hedw.
- Dicranum confine Müll. Hal. & Hampe
- Dicranum conglomeratum (Brid.) Wallr.
- Dicranum corniculatum (Wahlenb.) Spreng.
- Dicranum crassifolium Sérgio, Ochyra & Seneca
- Dicranum crispatulum (Roll) Kindb.
- Dicranum crispifolium Müll. Hal.
- Dicranum crispulum (Hedw.) Mitt.
- Dicranum cruegeri Müll. Hal.
- Dicranum cruegerianum Müll. Hal.
- Dicranum cryptodon (Mont.) Mitt.
- Dicranum cuneifolium Hampe ex Müll. Hal.
- Dicranum curtum (Hedw.) D. Mohr
- Dicranum cutlackii D.H. Norris & T.J. Kop.
- Dicranum cygneum Hedw.
- Dicranum cylindricum (Hedw.) Sm.
- Dicranum daymannianum (E.B. Bartram) D.H. Norris & T.J. Kop.
- Dicranum decumbens Thwaites & Mitt.
- Dicranum deflexicaulon Müll. Hal.
- Dicranum delavayi Besch.
- Dicranum densicoma Müll. Hal.
- Dicranum densifolium (Ångström) Müll. Hal.
- Dicranum densum Hook.
- Dicranum deplanchei Duby
- Dicranum dichelymoides Müll. Hal.
- Dicranum dicnemoides Müll. Hal.
- Dicranum dicranellatum Dusén
- Dicranum didymodon Griff.
- Dicranum dilatinerve Cardot & P. de la Varde
- Dicranum diminutum Brid.
- Dicranum diplospiniferum C. Gao & C.W. Aur
- Dicranum dispersum Engelmark
- Dicranum drepanocladium Müll. Hal.
- Dicranum drummondii Müll. Hal.
- Dicranum dubium Thér. & Dixon
- Dicranum ecaudatum Müll. Hal.
- Dicranum edentulum Mitt.
- Dicranum eggersianum Müll. Hal.
- Dicranum eggersii Müll. Hal.
- Dicranum elegans Duby
- Dicranum ellipticum Turner
- Dicranum elongatum Schleich. ex Schwägr. – dense fork-moss
- Dicranum eucamptodontoides Broth. & Geh.
- Dicranum euchlorum Mont.
- Dicranum exaltatum Müll. Hal.
- Dicranum exasperatum (Nees & Blume) Griff.
- Dicranum fagimontanum Brid.
- Dicranum fallax (Wilson) Hobk.
- Dicranum fasciculatum Schumach.
- Dicranum fastigiatum Schultz
- Dicranum filifolium Hornsch.
- Dicranum filum Bory
- Dicranum flagellare Hedw. – whip fork-moss
- Dicranum flavescens (Dicks. ex With.) Turner
- Dicranum flavidum Sw.
- Dicranum fragilifolium Lindb.
- Dicranum fragillimum Warnst.
- Dicranum frigidum Müll. Hal.
- Dicranum fulvum Hook.
- Dicranum fuscescens Turner – dusky fork-moss
- Dicranum gardneri Müll. Hal.
- Dicranum gayanum Mont.
- Dicranum geluense (Herzog) D.H. Norris & T.J. Kop.
- Dicranum gemmatum Müll. Hal.
- Dicranum gonoi Cardot
- Dicranum gregoryi B.H. Allen
- Dicranum grevilleanum (Brid.) Bruch & Schimp.
- Dicranum grimmioides Müll. Hal.
- Dicranum griseum (Hornsch.) Müll. Hal.
- Dicranum groenlandicum Brid.
- Dicranum guilleminianum Mont.
- Dicranum gymnostomum Mitt.
- Dicranum hamulosum Mitt.
- Dicranum hariotii Müll. Hal.
- Dicranum hildebrandtii Müll. Hal.
- Dicranum himalayanum Mitt.
- Dicranum hispidulum R.S. Williams
- Dicranum hokinense (Besch.) C. Gao & T. Cao
- Dicranum homalobolax Müll. Hal.
- Dicranum homannii Boeck
- Dicranum homomallum (Hedw.) Hassk.
- Dicranum howellii Renauld & Cardot
- Dicranum incrassatum (Müll. Hal.) Müll. Hal.
- Dicranum integerrimum Broth. & Geh.
- Dicranum itacolumitis Müll. Hal.
- Dicranum japonicum Mitt.
- Dicranum jashii Thér.
- Dicranum johannis-meyeri Müll. Hal.
- Dicranum johnstonii Mitt.
- Dicranum kashmirense Broth.
- Dicranum kerguelense Müll. Hal.
- Dicranum klauteri Reimers
- Dicranum kwangtungense (P.C. Chen) T.J. Kop.
- Dicranum laeve (Taylor) Müll. Hal.
- Dicranum lamellatum (Mont.) Müll. Hal.
- Dicranum lamellinerve Müll. Hal.
- Dicranum leiodontium Cardot
- Dicranum leioneuron Kindb. – fuzzy fork-moss
- Dicranum leucobryoides Besch. ex Müll. Hal.
- Dicranum liebmannii Müll. Hal.
- Dicranum linzianum C. Gao
- Dicranum longicolle (Michx.) Brid.
- Dicranum longicylindricum C. Gao & T. Cao
- Dicranum longipilum Müll. Hal.
- Dicranum longirostratum (P. Beauv.) Brid.
- Dicranum longirostre Schwägr.
- Dicranum lophoneuron Müll. Hal.
- Dicranum lorifolium Mitt.
- Dicranum mackayi Broth. & Dixon
- Dicranum maedae Sakurai
- Dicranum majus Turner – greater fork-moss
- Dicranum mamillosum C. Gao & C.W. Aur
- Dicranum martianum Hornsch.
- Dicranum mayrii Broth.
- Dicranum menziesii Hook. f. & Wilson
- Dicranum mittenii Müll. Hal.
- Dicranum montanum Hedw. – mountain fork-moss
- Dicranum muehlenbeckii Bruch & Schimp.
- Dicranum myosuroides DC.
- Dicranum nanum (Müll. Hal.) Müll. Hal.
- Dicranum nelsonii Müll. Hal.
- Dicranum nepalense (Brid.) Müll. Hal.
- Dicranum nigricans Herzog
- Dicranum nipponense Besch.
- Dicranum nitidum (Dozy & Molk.) Dozy & Molk.
- Dicranum nivale (Brid.) Spreng.
- Dicranum novaustrinum Margad.
- Dicranum obliquatum Mitt.
- Dicranum ontariense W.L. Peterson
- Dicranum orientale (F. Weber) D. Mohr
- Dicranum orthophylloides Dixon
- Dicranum orthophyllum Broth.
- Dicranum osmundoides (Hedw.) Turner
- Dicranum otii (Sakurai) Sakurai
- Dicranum pachyneuron (Molendo) Kindb.
- Dicranum pacificum Ignatova & Fedosov
- Dicranum pallescens (Besch.) Müll. Hal.
- Dicranum pallidisetum (J.W. Bailey) Ireland
- Dicranum pallidum (Hedw.) D. Mohr
- Dicranum palmatum (Hedw.) F. Weber & D. Mohr
- Dicranum pancheri Müll. Hal.
- Dicranum papillidens Broth.
- Dicranum paramicola Müll. Hal.
- Dicranum patens (Dicks. ex Hedw.) Sm.
- Dicranum pauperum Hampe
- Dicranum perexile Müll. Hal.
- Dicranum perhorridum (Dusén) Cardot
- Dicranum perichaetiale (P. Beauv.) Brid.
- Dicranum perlongifolium Cardot
- Dicranum perrottetii Mont.
- Dicranum peruvianum H. Rob.
- Dicranum petrophylum G. Negri
- Dicranum pinetorum Griff.
- Dicranum planinervium Taylor
- Dicranum platyloma Besch.
- Dicranum plurisetum (Müll. Hal. ex Dixon) Fife
- Dicranum polycarpum (Hedw.) F. Weber & D. Mohr
- Dicranum polychaetum Mitt.
- Dicranum polypodioides (Hedw.) F. Weber & D. Mohr
- Dicranum polysetum Sw. – rugose fork-moss
- Dicranum psathyrum Klazenga
- Dicranum pseudacutifolium Otnyukova
- Dicranum pseudofalcatum Seppelt
- Dicranum pseudojulaceum (Müll. Hal.) Müll. Hal.
- Dicranum pseudoleucoloma Müll. Hal.
- Dicranum pseudorobustum Müll. Hal. ex Geh.
- Dicranum pterotoneuron Müll. Hal.
- Dicranum pulvinatum (Hedw.) Sw. ex Lag.
- Dicranum punctulatum Hampe
- Dicranum pungentella Müll. Hal.
- Dicranum ramosum C. Gao & C.W. Aur
- Dicranum rectifolium Müll. Hal.
- Dicranum recurvatum Schultz
- Dicranum recurvum Mitt.
- Dicranum reflexisetum Müll. Hal.
- Dicranum reflexum Müll. Hal.
- Dicranum rhabdocarpum Sull.
- Dicranum richardii (Brid.) Müll. Hal.
- Dicranum richardsoni Drumm.
- Dicranum rigidum (Hornsch.) Müll. Hal.
- Dicranum robustum Hook. f. & Wilson
- Dicranum rodriguezii Müll. Hal.
- Dicranum rogeri Brid.
- Dicranum rufescens (With.) Turner
- Dicranum rugifolium (E.B. Bartram) D.H. Norris & T.J. Kop.
- Dicranum rupestre Brid.
- Dicranum rutenbergii Müll. Hal.
- Dicranum sanctum Nees ex Schwägr.
- Dicranum savannarum Müll. Hal.
- Dicranum savatieri (Besch.) Schimp. ex Paris
- Dicranum saxatile Lag., D. García & Clemente
- Dicranum schensianum Müll. Hal.
- Dicranum schistioides Broth. ex Iisiba
- Dicranum schwaneckeanum Hampe
- Dicranum sciuroides (Hedw.) P. Gaertn., B. Mey. & Scherb.
- Dicranum scopareolum Müll. Hal.
- Dicranum scoparium Hedw. – broom fork-moss
- Dicranum scopellifolium Müll. Hal.
- Dicranum scottianum Turner ex Scott, Robert – Scott's fork-moss
- Dicranum seligeri Brid.
- Dicranum semicompletum (Hedw.) D. Mohr
- Dicranum septentrionale Tubanova & Ignatova
- Dicranum serrulatum (Brid.) Hampe
- Dicranum setifolium Cardot
- Dicranum setschwanicum Broth.
- Dicranum smaragdinum (Brid.) Müll. Hal.
- Dicranum sordidum Wilson ex Mitt.
- Dicranum spadiceum J.E. Zetterst.
- Dicranum speirophyllum Mont.
- Dicranum splachnoides Brid.
- Dicranum spurium Hedw. – rusty fork-moss
- Dicranum squarrosulum Müll. Hal.
- Dicranum stellatum Brid.
- Dicranum stenocarpum (Hampe) Müll. Hal.
- Dicranum striatulum Mitt.
- Dicranum strictum (Dicks.) Sm.
- Dicranum strumiferum (Hedw.) F. Weber & D. Mohr
- Dicranum stuhlmannii Broth.
- Dicranum stygium Brid.
- Dicranum subbasilare (Hedw.) D. Mohr
- Dicranum subconfine Besch.
- Dicranum subluteum Mitt.
- Dicranum subporodictyon (Broth.) C. Gao & T. Cao
- Dicranum suecicum (Arnell & C.E.O. Jensen) Adlerz
- Dicranum sullivanii Müll. Hal.
- Dicranum sumichrastii Duby
- Dicranum surinamense (Müll. Hal.) Müll. Hal.
- Dicranum symblepharoides Cardot
- Dicranum syrrhopodontoides Müll. Hal.
- Dicranum tapes Müll. Hal.
- Dicranum tauricum Sapjegin – fragile fork-moss
- Dicranum taxifolium (Hedw.) F. Weber & D. Mohr
- Dicranum tectorum Warnst. & H. Klinggr.
- Dicranum tenerum (Mitt.) Müll. Hal.
- Dicranum tenuifolium (Brid.) P. Beauv.
- Dicranum terebrifolium Müll. Hal.
- Dicranum thelinotum Müll. Hal.
- Dicranum thraustophyllum Müll. Hal.
- Dicranum thwaitesii Mitt.
- Dicranum toninii Müll. Hal.
- Dicranum torfaceum (Bruch & Schimp.) Müll. Hal.
- Dicranum torquatum Mitt.
- Dicranum tortifolium (Hook. f. & Wilson) Mitt.
- Dicranum trachyblepharon Müll. Hal.
- Dicranum transsylvanicum Luth
- Dicranum trichopodum Mitt.
- Dicranum triforme (Mitt.) Hampe
- Dicranum triviale (Müll. Hal. ex E. Britton) Müll. Hal.
- Dicranum truncatum (Müll. Hal.) Müll. Hal.
- Dicranum truncicola Broth.
- Dicranum tubulifolium Ireland
- Dicranum undulatifolium (Dixon) D.H. Norris & T.J. Kop.
- Dicranum undulatum Schrad. ex Brid.
- Dicranum vaginatum Hook.
- Dicranum viride (Sull. & Lesq.) Lindb.
- Dicranum viridissimum (Dicks.) Turner
- Dicranum wallisii Müll. Hal.
- Dicranum weymouthii Müll. Hal.
- Dicranum widgrenii Müll. Hal.
- Dicranum yezomontanum Nog.
- Dicranum zygodonticarpum Müll. Hal.
