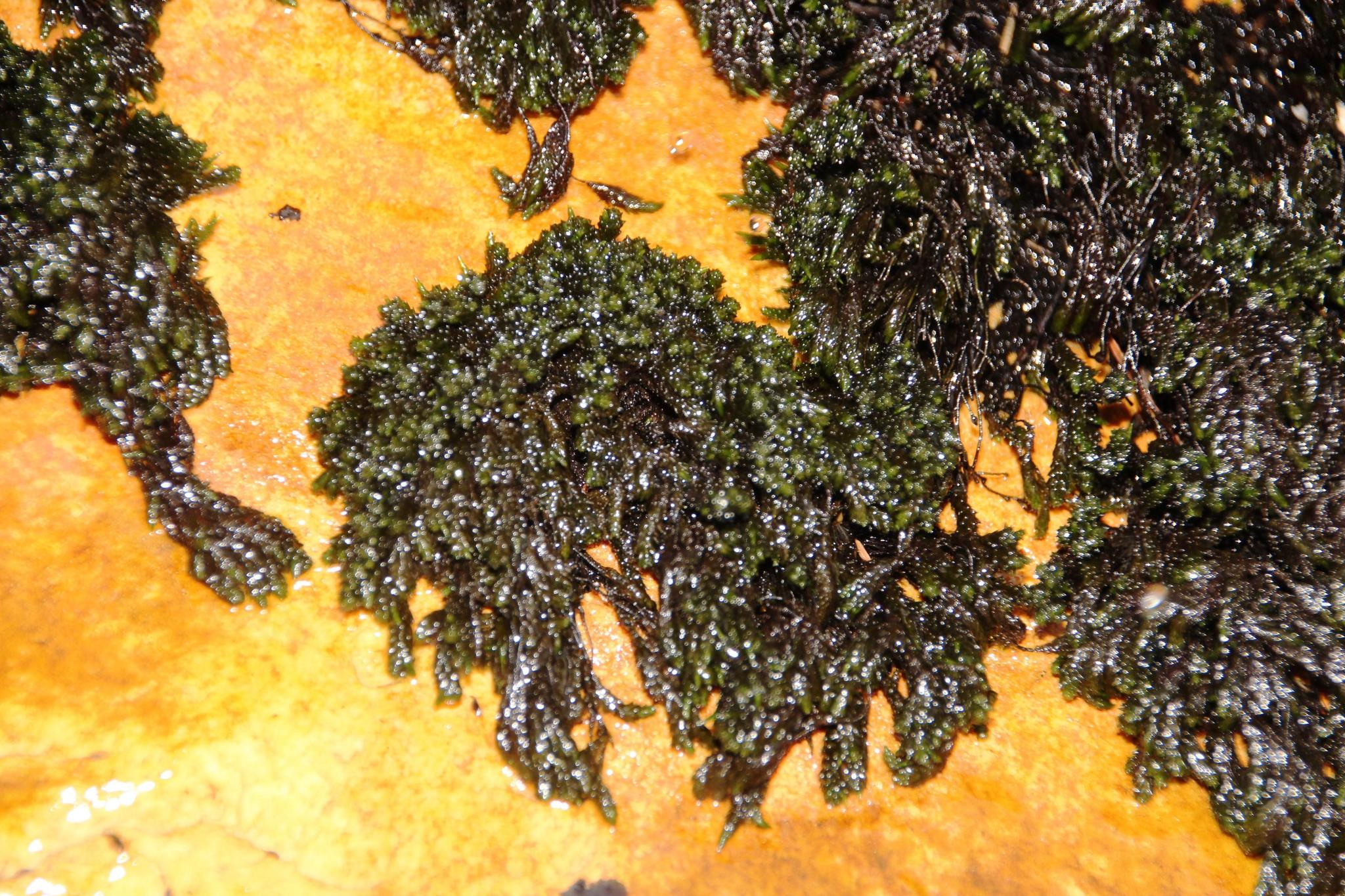

Conservation status
- Least Concern (IUCN 3.1)

Scientific classification
- Kingdom: Plantae
- Division: Bryophyta
- Class: Bryopsida
- Subclass: Dicranidae
- Order: Dicranales
- Family: Dicranaceae
- Genus: Wardia; Harv. & Hook.
- Species: W. hygrometrica

Binomial name
- Wardia hygrometrica Harv. & Hook.

Synonyms
- Fontinalis duthieae Dixon; Neckera hygrometrica (Harv. & Hook.) Müll.Hal.

= Wardia =

Genus of mosses

Wardia is a monotypic genus of mosses in the subclass Dicranidae; it contains only the species Wardia hygrometrica, "an aquatic moss endemic to the Western Cape province of South Africa." It is the only endemic moss family in South Africa. As it is an aquatic moss, it was first classified in the Fontinalaceae (and in the order of Isobryales), but molecular studies have shown that it is more closely related to the Dicranaceae.

The genus name of Wardia is in honour of Nathaniel Bagshaw Ward (1791–1868), who was an English doctor.The specific epithet hygrometrica refers to the hygroscopic nature of the seta (stalk).

The genus was circumscribed by William Henry Harvey and William Jackson Hooker in Companion Bot. Mag. 2 on page 183 in 1837.

== Description ==
It forms small to large, yellow-green or usually blackish green mats. The stems are 15-80 mm long and black below when old. The stems branch irregularly above the basal part (stipe). The leaves are evenly spaced, spreading to erect-appressed when dry, although variable in shape and length, they are generally broadly elliptical and up to 2.2 mm long. The leaf cells are narrow and thick-walled. The midrib of the leaf is extremely variable: ranging from absent, present only in the leaf base, discontinuous and present only at the apex and base, or strong throughout. The cells at the basal margins of the leaf (alar cells - which control the leaf's movement) are strongly differentiated, enlarged and inflated, hyaline to yellowish.

== Habitat ==
It grows on rocks, either submerged or in splash-zones of fast-flowing mountain streams and waterfalls.
