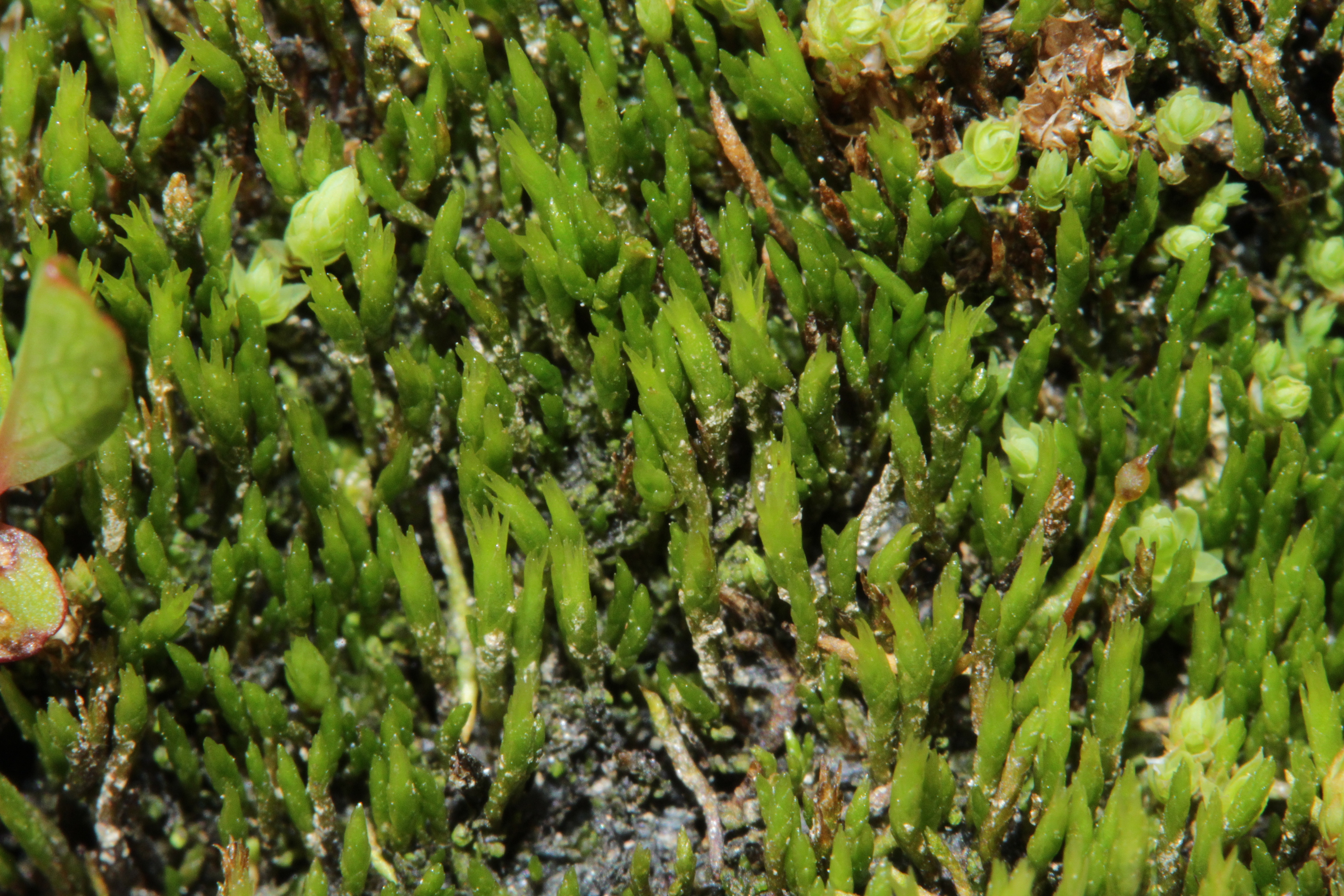
- Aongstroemia longipes

Scientific classification
- Kingdom: Plantae
- Division: Bryophyta
- Class: Bryopsida
- Subclass: Dicranidae
- Order: Dicranales
- Family: Dicranaceae
- Genus: Aongstroemia; Bruch & Schimp.

= Aongstroemia =

Genus of mosses

Aongstroemia is a genus of mosses belonging to the family Dicranaceae.

The genus has cosmopolitan distribution.

There are 75 accepted species, including:

- Aongstroemia aciculata Müll.Hal.
- Aongstroemia alpina Müll.Hal.
- Aongstroemia longipes (Sommerf.) Bruch & Schimp.
