= Mitrobryum =

Scientific classification
- Kingdom: Plantae
- Division: Bryophyta
- Class: Bryopsida
- Subclass: Dicranidae
- Order: Dicranales
- Family: Dicranaceae
- Genus: Mitrobryum; H.Rob.

Genus of mosses

Mitrobryum is a genus of moss in family Dicranaceae.

It contains the following species (but this list may be incomplete):

- Mitrobryum koelzii, H.Rob.
