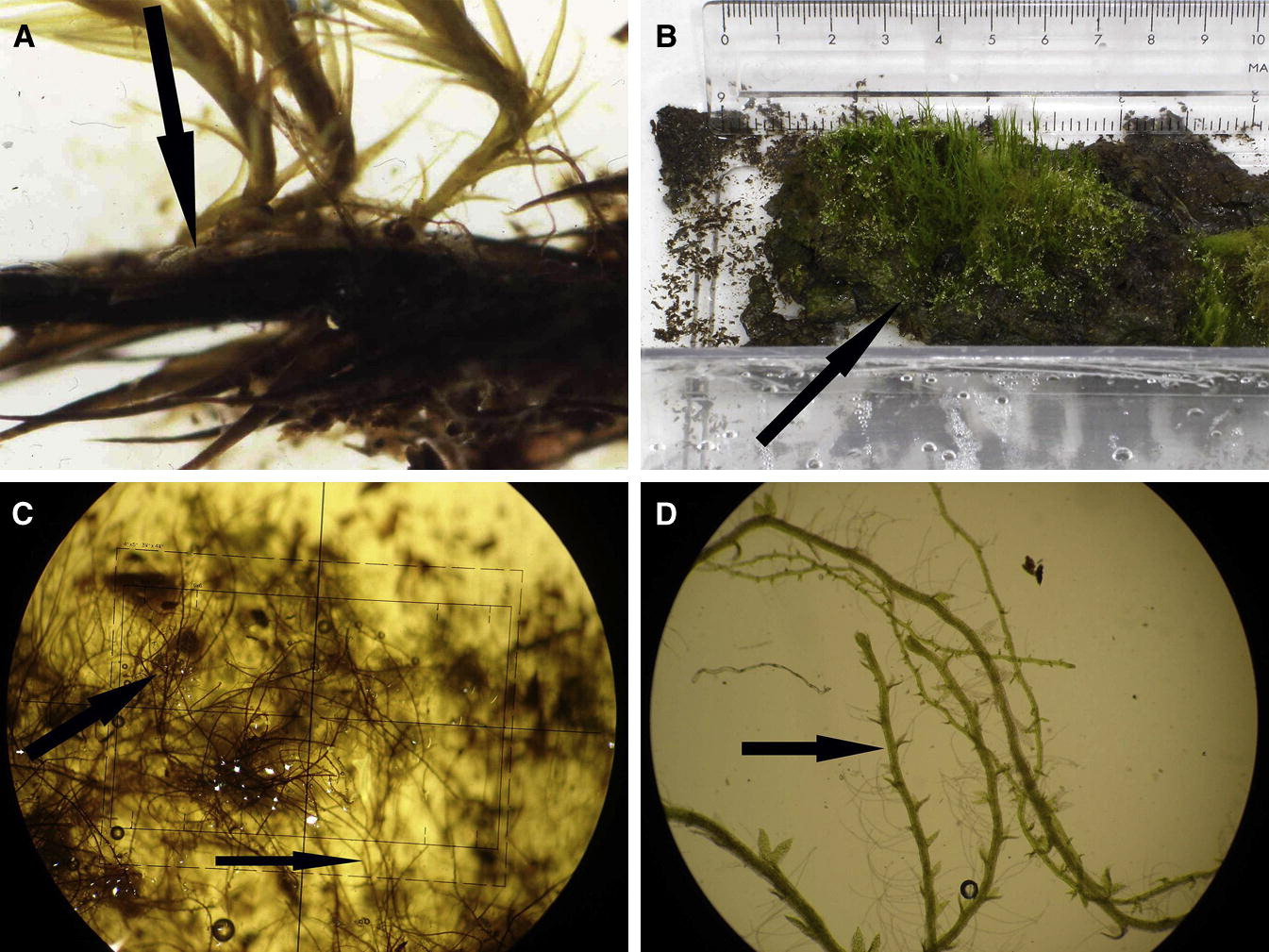
- Chorisodontium aciphyllum

Scientific classification
- Kingdom: Plantae
- Division: Bryophyta
- Class: Bryopsida
- Subclass: Dicranidae
- Order: Dicranales
- Family: Dicranaceae
- Genus: Chorisodontium; V.F.Brotherus, 1924

= Chorisodontium =

Genus of mosses

Chorisodontium is a genus of mosses belonging to the family Dicranaceae.

The species of this genus are found in New Zealand and South America.

Species:

- Chorisodontium aciphyllum Brotherus, 1924
- Chorisodontium burrowsii Allison, 1963
