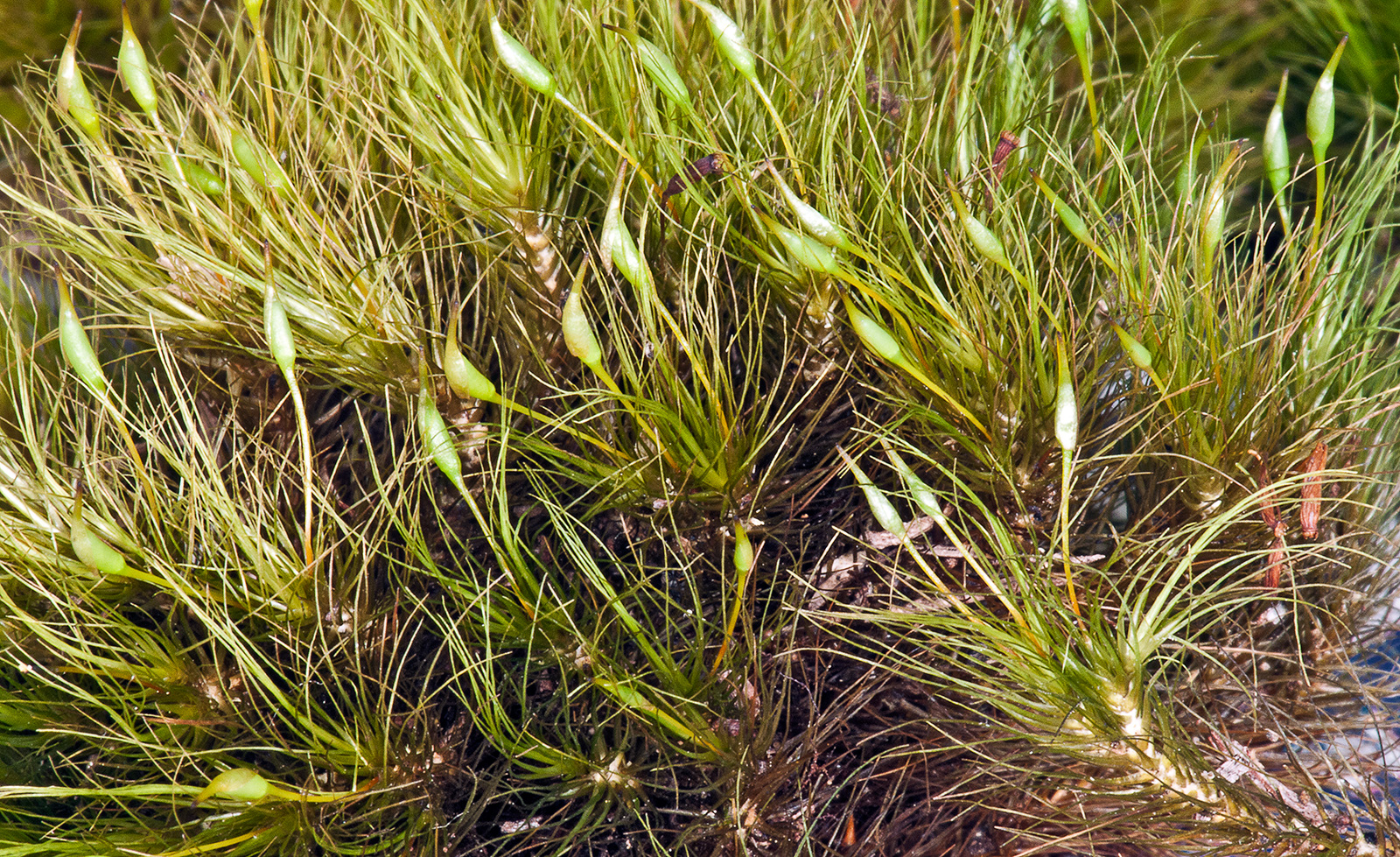
- Dicranoloma menziesii

Scientific classification
- Kingdom: Plantae
- Division: Bryophyta
- Class: Bryopsida
- Subclass: Dicranidae
- Order: Dicranales
- Family: Dicranaceae
- Genus: Dicranoloma (Renauld) Renauld

Species
- Dicranoloma billardierei; Dicranoloma dicarpum

= Dicranoloma =

Genus of mosses

Dicranoloma is a genus of mosses in the family Dicranaceae. The Dicranoloma mosses are distributed in the Southern Hemisphere, while the Dicranum mosses are found in the Northern Hemisphere. Species within this genus are dioicous. Dicranoloma may be found in the form of mats on beech/podocarp forest floors of New Zealand's northern South Island. Dicranoloma dicarpum has a wide distribution in both hemispheres.
