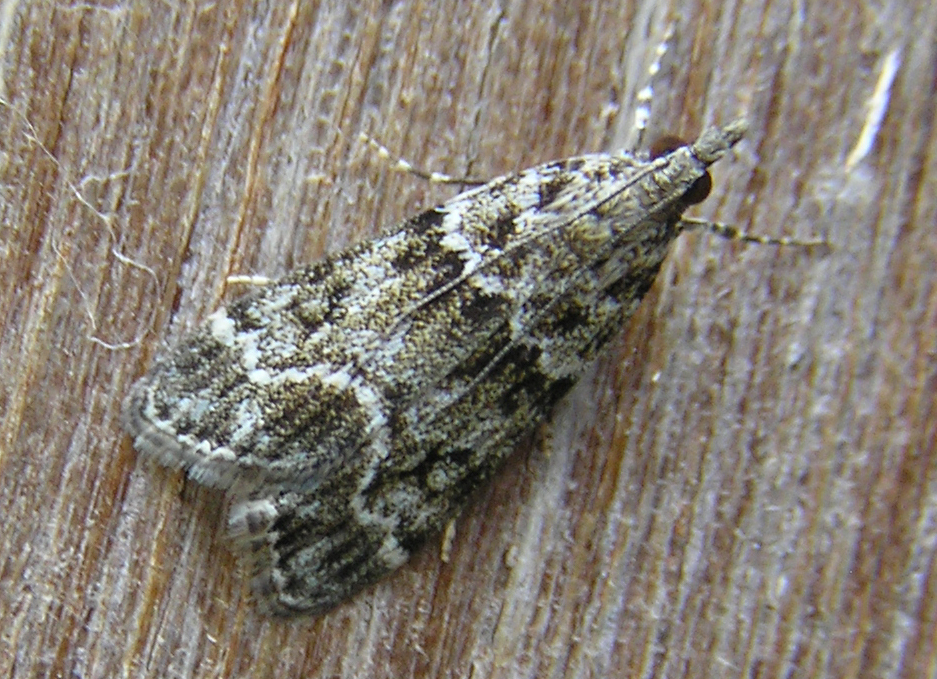

Scientific classification
- Kingdom: Animalia
- Phylum: Arthropoda
- Class: Insecta
- Order: Lepidoptera
- Family: Crambidae
- Genus: Eudonia
- Species: E. mercurella

Binomial name
- Eudonia mercurella (Linnaeus, 1758)

Synonyms
- Phalaena (Tinea) mercurella Linnaeus, 1758; Eudorea concinnella J. Curtis, 1850; Eudorea frequentella Stainton, 1849; Eudorea portlandica Humphreys & Westwood, 1841; Eudonia mercurella puella Leraut, 1982

= Eudonia mercurella =

Species of moth

Eudonia mercurella is a species of moth of the family Crambidae. It is found in Europe, western China, Iran, Lebanon, Turkey, and north-western Africa.

== Description ==
The wingspan is 16–19 mm (0.63–0.75 in). The forewings are dark black variously mixed with brown and with a darker band along the distal edge of the pale antemedian line. The pale postmedian line is usually distinct against the dark ground colour. A similar species is Eudonia lacustrata, which differs from Eudonia mercurella by the broken wavy line that forms a broad white spot at the tip of the wing (apex). Another distinguishing feature of the females is the ventrodistal hump of the valvae. Furthermore, Eudonia mercurella resembles Eudonia speideli externally and pale specimens of Eudonia liebmani.

== Behavior ==
The moth flies from June to August depending on the location.

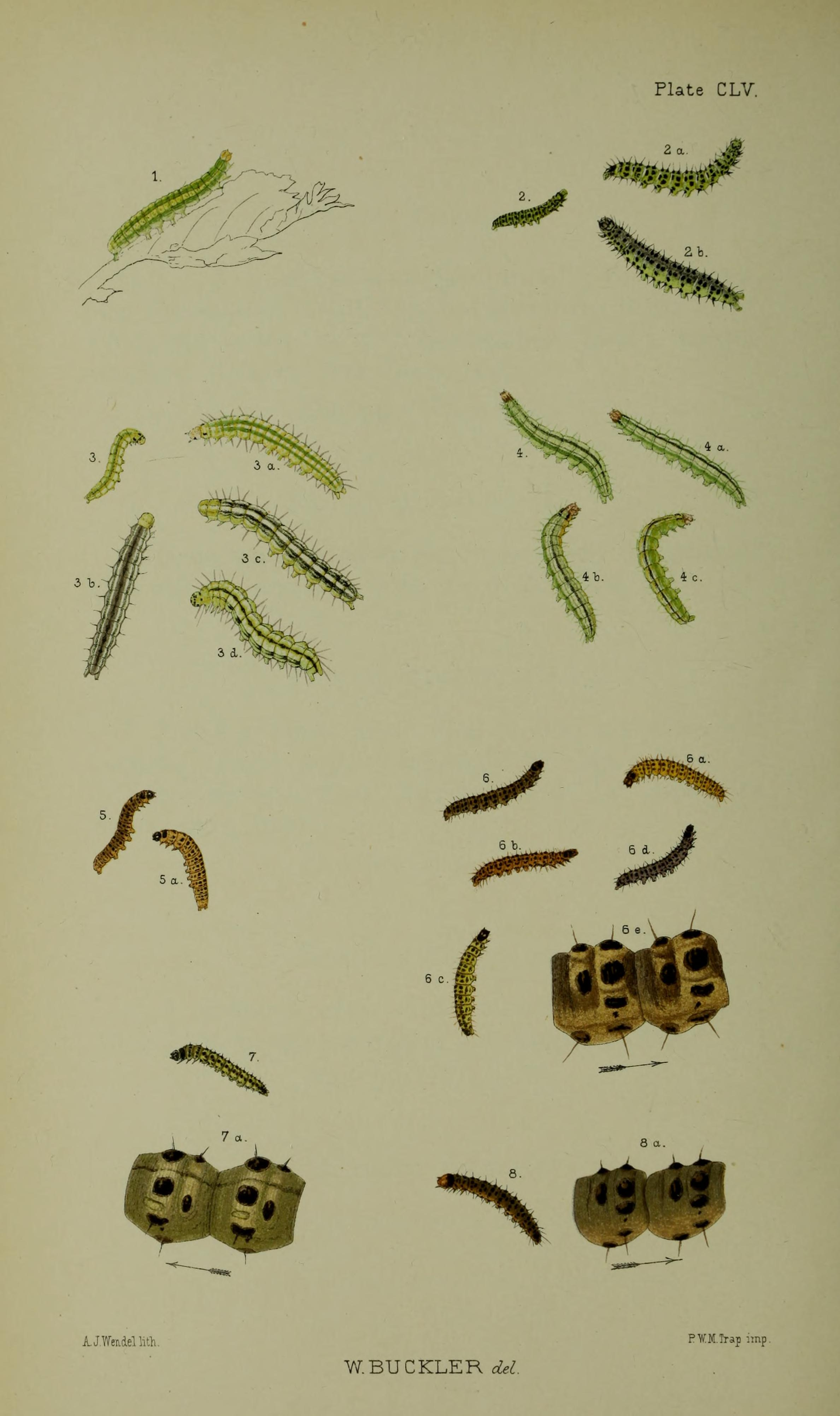
Figs. 6, 6a, 6b, 6c, 6dlarvae in various stages of growth 6e enlarged figure of two segments of 6

The larvae feed on various mosses.

== Taxonomy ==
Phalaena mercurella described by Zetterstedt in 1839 was actually Eudonia murana.
