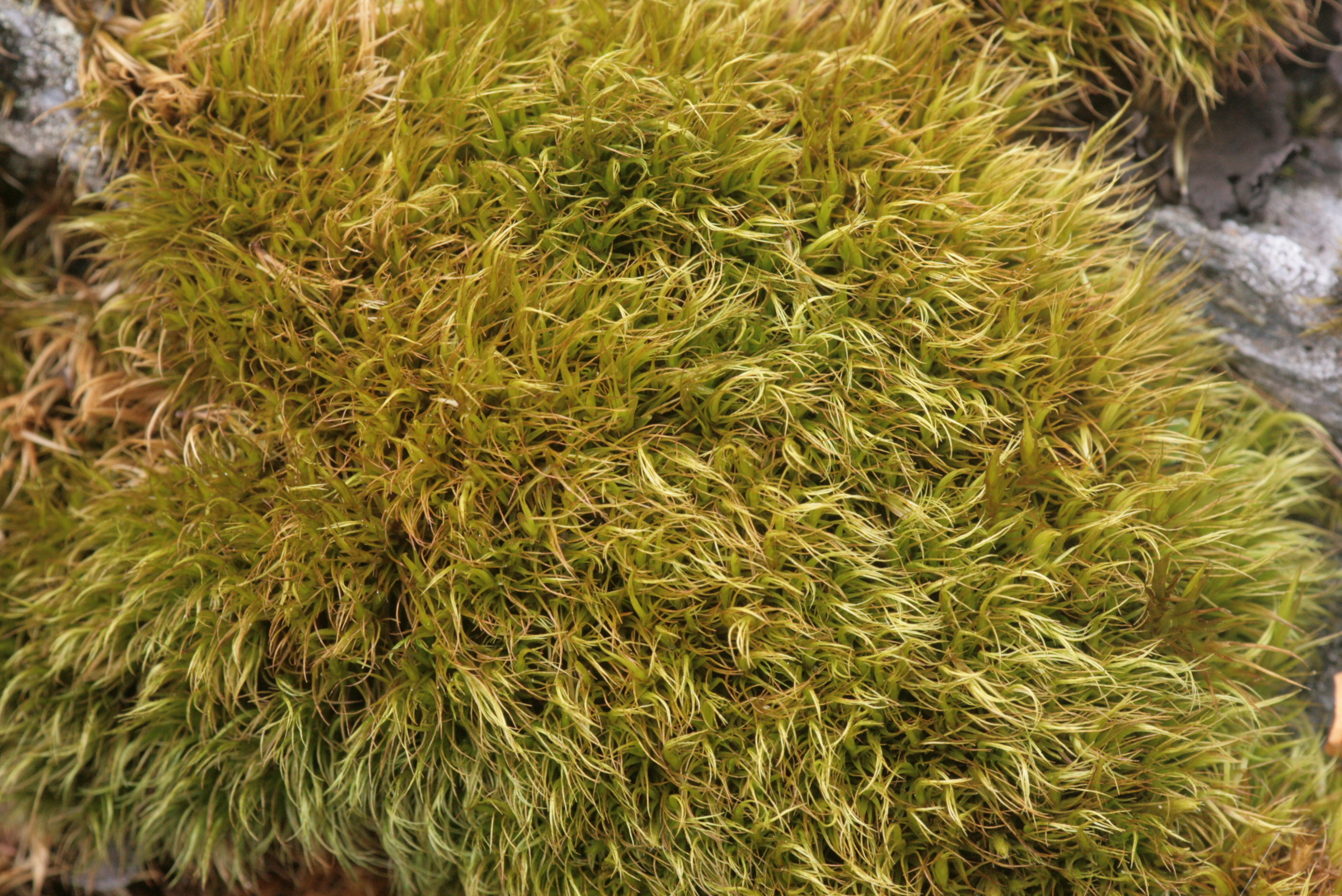
- Paraleucobryum longifolium

Scientific classification
- Kingdom: Plantae
- Division: Bryophyta
- Class: Bryopsida
- Subclass: Dicranidae
- Order: Dicranales
- Family: Dicranaceae
- Genus: Paraleucobryum (Lindb. ex Lipmpr.) Loeske

= Paraleucobryum =

Genus of mosses

Paraleucobryum is a genus of mosses belonging to the family Dicranaceae.

The genus was first described by Sextus Otto Lindberg.

The genus has almost cosmopolitan distribution.

Species:

- Paraleucobryum longifolium Loeske, 1908
