= Anisothecium elegans =

Scientific classification
- Kingdom: Plantae
- Division: Bryophyta
- Class: Bryopsida
- Subclass: Dicranidae
- Order: Dicranales
- Family: Dicranaceae
- Genus: Anisothecium
- Species: A. elegans

Binomial name
- Anisothecium elegans (Duby) Thér., 1935

Synonyms
- Dicranum elegans Duby; Aongstroemia elegans (Duby) Broth.; Dichodontium elegans (Duby) A. Jaeger; Dicranella elegans (Duby) Larraín

Species of moss

Anisothecium elegans is a species of mosses in the family Dicranaceae. It is found in Chile.
