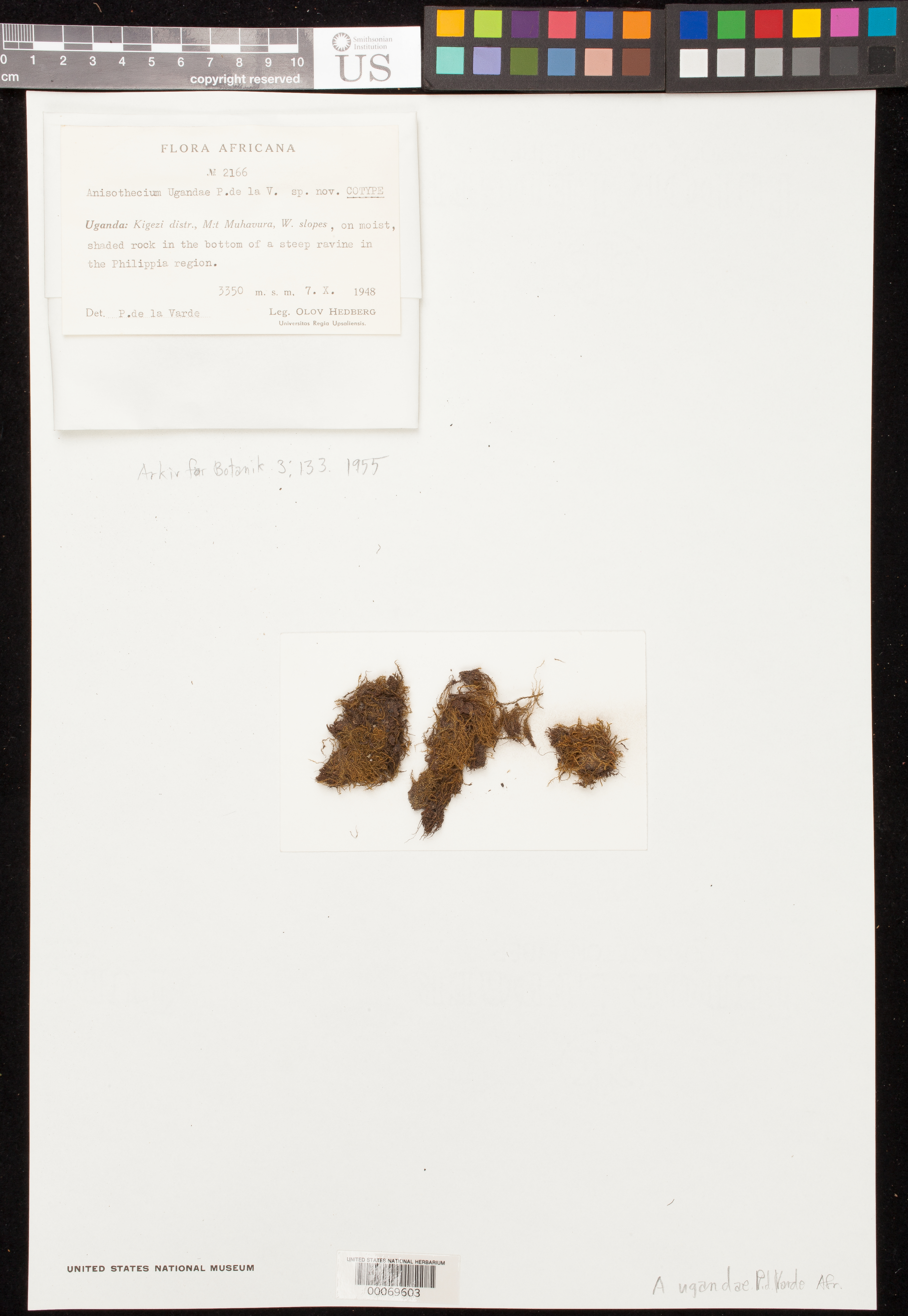
- Anisothecium ugandae

Scientific classification
- Kingdom: Plantae
- Division: Bryophyta
- Class: Bryopsida
- Subclass: Dicranidae
- Order: Dicranales
- Family: Dicranaceae
- Genus: Anisothecium; Mitten, 1869

Species
- See text

= Anisothecium =

Genus of mosses

Anisothecium is a genus of mosses in the family Dicranaceae.

== Species ==
- Anisothecium brachyangium
- Anisothecium brachydontium
- Anisothecium campylophyllum
- Anisothecium capituligerum
- Anisothecium clathratum
- Anisothecium convolutum
- Anisothecium cyrtodontum
- Anisothecium elegans
- Anisothecium globuligerum
- Anisothecium gracillimum
- Anisothecium grevilleanum
- Anisothecium hioramii
- Anisothecium hookeri
- Anisothecium horridum
- Anisothecium humile
- Anisothecium javanicum
- Anisothecium laxirete
- Anisothecium lorentzii
- Anisothecium macrostomum
- Anisothecium madagassum
- Anisothecium molliculum
- Anisothecium nicholsii
- Anisothecium palustre
- Anisothecium planinervium
- Anisothecium pseudorufescens
- Anisothecium pycnoglossum
- Anisothecium recurvimarginatum
- Anisothecium rotundatum
- Anisothecium rufescens
- Anisothecium rufipes
- Anisothecium ruttneri
- Anisothecium schreberianum
- Anisothecium skottsbergii
- Anisothecium spirale
- Anisothecium staphylinum
- Anisothecium submacrostomum
- Anisothecium ugandae
- Anisothecium vaginatum
- Anisothecium varium
- Anisothecium yezoanum
