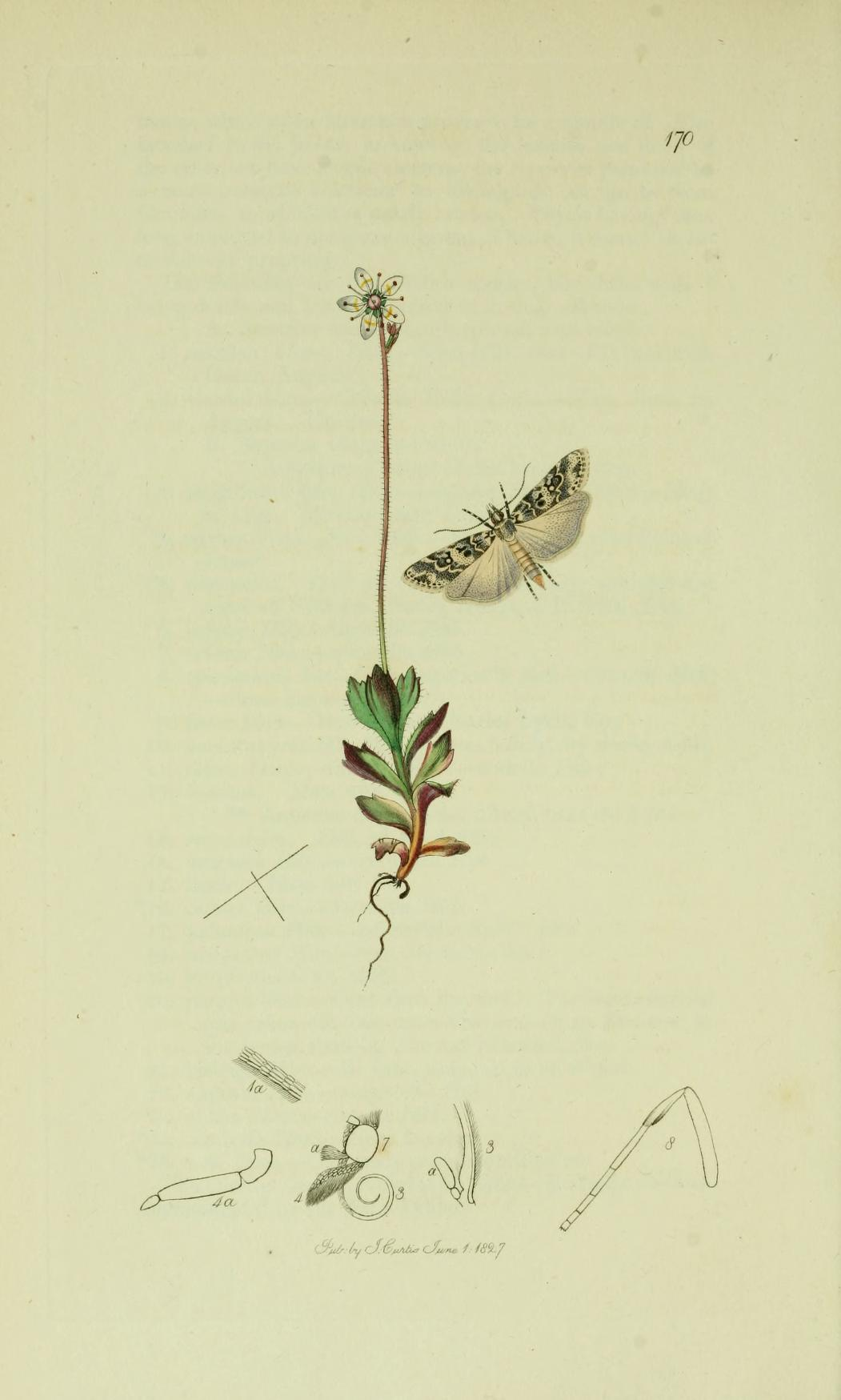
- Illustration from John Curtis's British Entomology Volume 6

Scientific classification
- Kingdom: Animalia
- Phylum: Arthropoda
- Class: Insecta
- Order: Lepidoptera
- Family: Crambidae
- Genus: Eudonia
- Species: E. murana

Binomial name
- Eudonia murana (J. Curtis, 1827)

Synonyms
- Eudorea murana (J. Curtis, 1827); Scoparia scoparia; Scoparia murana var. tuoniana Hoffmann, 1893; Scoparia pseudomurana Muller-Rutz 1825; Scoparia ranica Strand 1920; Eudonia murana brusseauxi Leraut, 2003; Eudonia murana derrai Leraut, 1982; Lemmatophila antiquella Zetterstedt, 1839; Scoparia muralis Guenée, 1854; Scoparia delphinatalis Guenée, 1854; Scoparia murana f. coll. fasciata Osthelder, 1939; Phalaena mercurella sensu Zetterstedt, 1839: misidentification)

= Eudonia murana =

Species of moth

Eudonia murana, the Scotch gray or wall grey, is a moth of the family Crambidae. It was described by John Curtis in 1827 and is found in most of Europe.

The wingspan is 18–23 mm. Adults are on wing from June to August, possibly in two generations.

The larvae feed on various mosses growing on rocks and walls, including Hypnum cupressiformis, Dicranum scoparium, Bryum capillare and Grimmia pulvinata.
