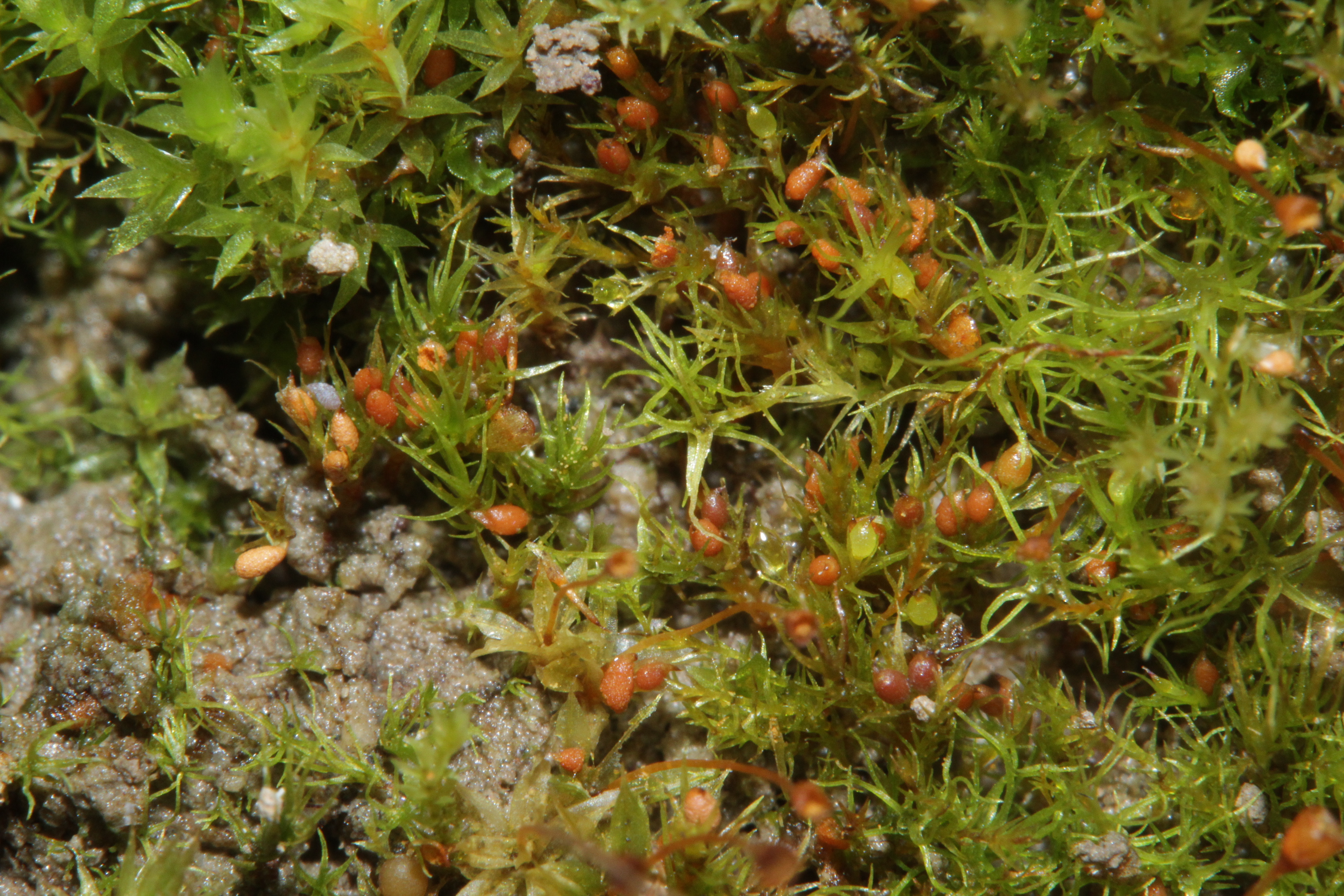
- Pseudephemerum nitidum

Scientific classification
- Kingdom: Plantae
- Division: Bryophyta
- Class: Bryopsida
- Subclass: Dicranidae
- Order: Dicranales
- Family: Dicranaceae
- Genus: Pseudephemerum (Lindb.) I.Hagen

= Pseudephemerum =

Genus of mosses

Pseudephemerum is a genus of mosses belonging to the family Dicranaceae.

== Taxonomy ==
=== Species ===
- Pseudephemerum caldense (Müll. Hal.) Broth.
- Pseudephemerum laxifolium (Renauld & Cardot) Thér.
- Pseudephemerum nitidum (Hedw.) Loeske
- Pseudephemerum tenellum (Mitt.) Broth.
