= Arctoa blyttii =

Scientific classification
- Kingdom: Plantae
- Division: Bryophyta
- Class: Bryopsida
- Subclass: Dicranidae
- Order: Dicranales
- Family: Dicranaceae
- Genus: Arctoa
- Species: A. blyttii

Binomial name
- Arctoa blyttii (Bruch & Schimp.) Loeske

Synonyms
- List: Cynodontium bruntonii var. limprichtianum (Grebe) Mönk.; Cynodontium limprichtianum Grebe; Cynodontium suecicum var. limprichtianum (Grebe) I. Hagen; Cynodontium treleasei Cardot & Thér.; Dicranoweisia obliqua Kindb.; Dicranum blyttii Bruch & Schimp.; Dicranum hispidulum R.S. Williams; Dicranum schisti Lindb.; Dicranum starkei subsp. blyttii (Bruch & Schimp.) Boulay; Kiaeria blyttii (Bruch & Schimp.) Broth.; Kiaeria starkei var. blyttii (Bruch & Schimp.) I. Hagen

Species of moss

Arctoa blyttii is a species of moss in the family Dicranaceae. It has a cosmopolitan distribution.
