= Cnestrum (plant) =

Scientific classification
- Kingdom: Plantae
- Division: Bryophyta
- Class: Bryopsida
- Subclass: Dicranidae
- Order: Dicranales
- Family: Dicranaceae
- Genus: Cnestrum; I.Hagen

Genus of mosses

Cnestrum is a genus of mosses belonging to the family Dicranaceae.

The species of this genus are found in Northern Hemisphere.

Species:

- Cnestrum alpestre (Wahlenb. ex Huebener) Nyholm ex Mogensen
- Cnestrum glaucescens Holmen ex Mogensen & Steere, 1979
