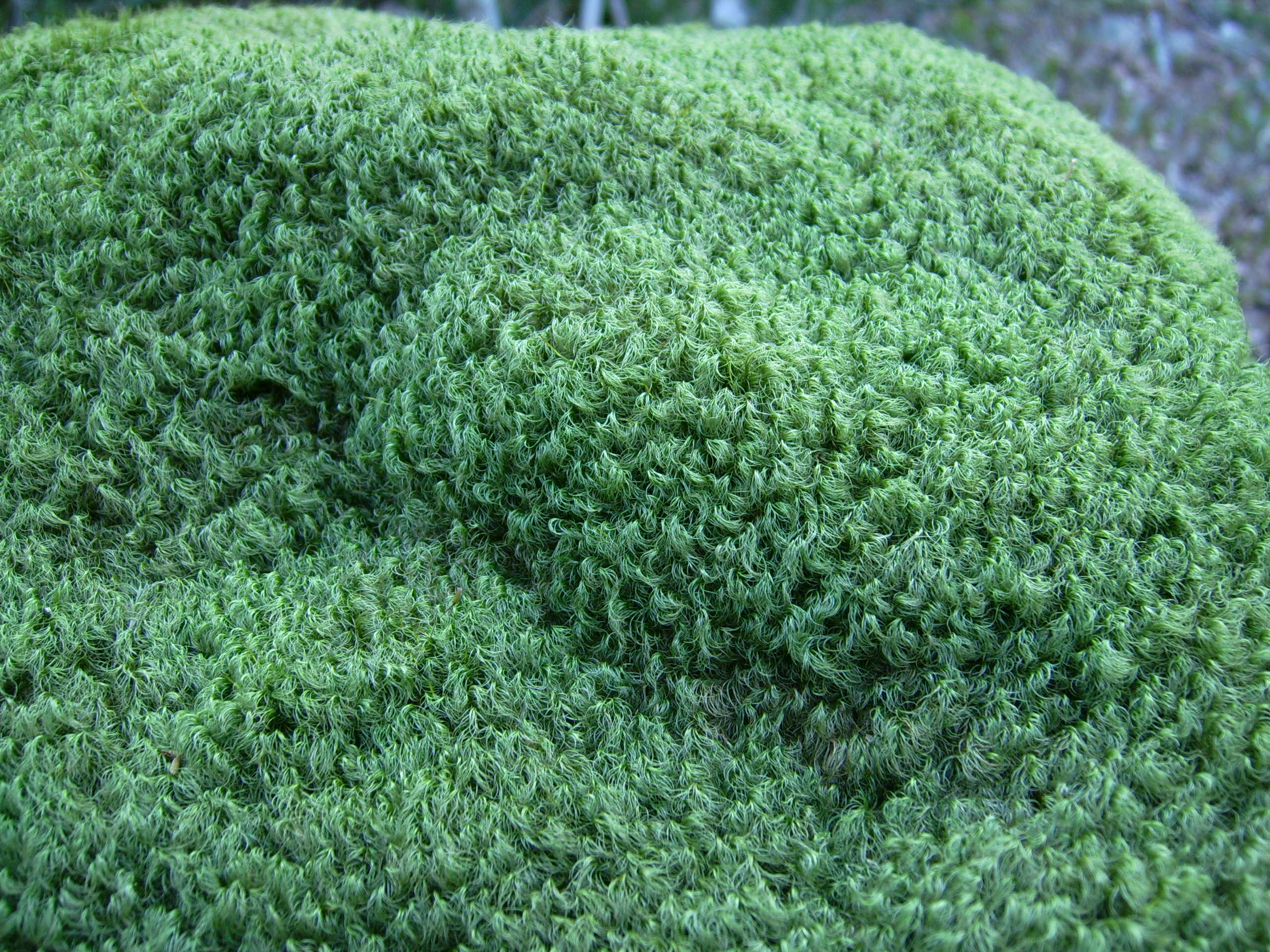
- Broom moss in Lake Superior Provincial Park, Ontario

Scientific classification
- Kingdom: Plantae
- Division: Bryophyta
- Class: Bryopsida
- Subclass: Dicranidae
- Order: Dicranales
- Family: Dicranaceae
- Genus: Dicranum
- Species: D. scoparium

Binomial name
- Dicranum scoparium Hedw.

= Dicranum scoparium =

Dicranum scoparium Broom forkmoss

Species of moss

Dicranum scoparium, the broom forkmoss, is a dicranaceous moss, native to most of the northern hemisphere as well as Oceania. It usually forms and grows in round mass clumps or mats on soil in dry to moist forested areas. As with many types of moss Broom moss grows in clumps with Broom mosses as well as other mosses. It can be distinguished by its leaves, which strongly curve to one side.

== Description ==
Broom forkmoss is usually robust and coarse, forming shiny tufts with woolly stems 2–8 cm (0.79–3.15 in) high. The leaf midrib extends to the tip and usually has 4 ridges along its back. The leaves are 3.5–8 mm (0.14–0.31 in) long, lance-shaped with a long, slender point, and strongly toothed along the upper third. Most leaves will be folded and curved to one side, but may be wavy. Capsules are 2.3–5 mm long, urn-shaped and curved. The capsules are held on mostly-erect stalks 18–35 mm (0.71–1.38 in) long. The operculum (capsule lid) is usually longer than the capsule. Male D. scoparium are less common than the females, and males are usually dwarfed compared to females.

As a bryophyte, Dicranum scoparium has multicellular rhizoids (root structure) which help with water absorption and anchor the plant to the ground.

== Distribution ==
Broom forkmoss can be found across North America (except Labrador, North Dakota, Texas and Nevada), Europe, Asia, northern Africa as well as in Australia and New Zealand.

== Gallery ==
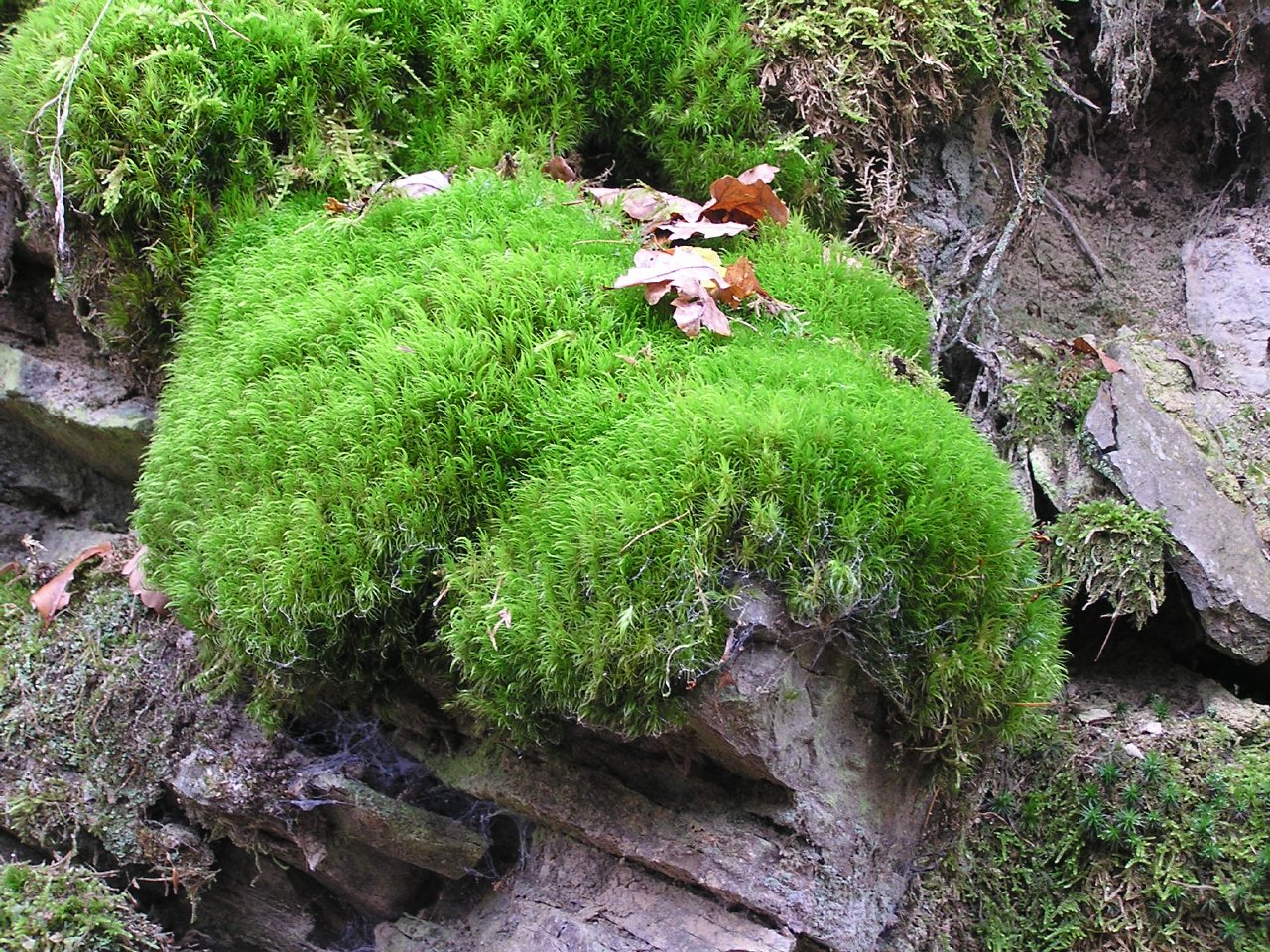

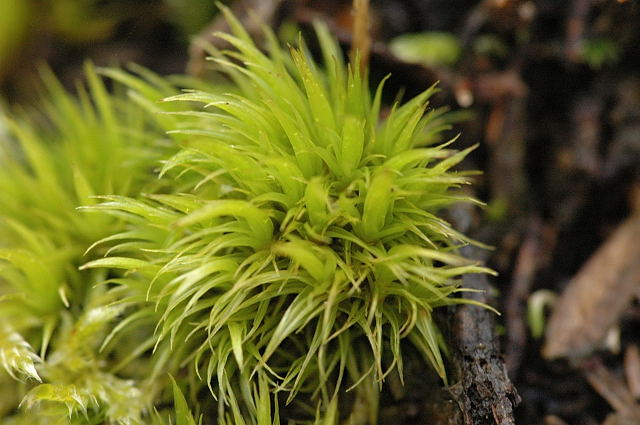

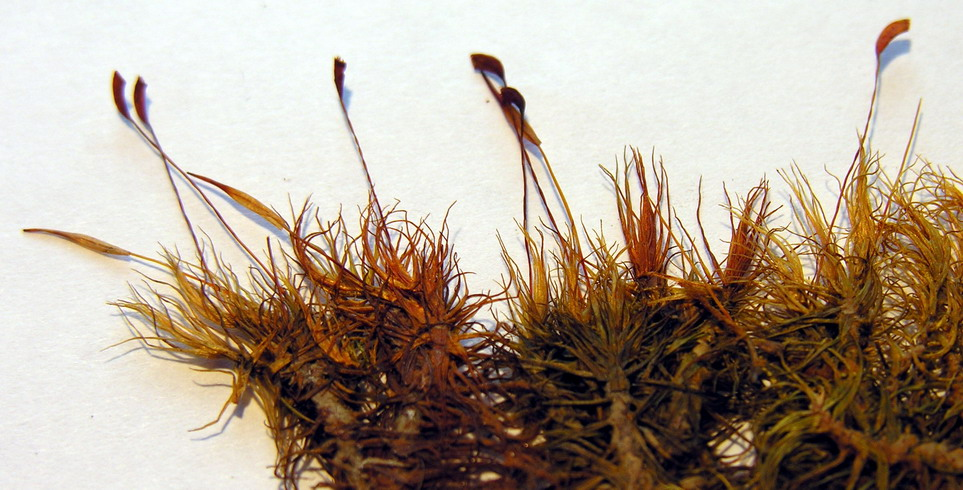
Capsules

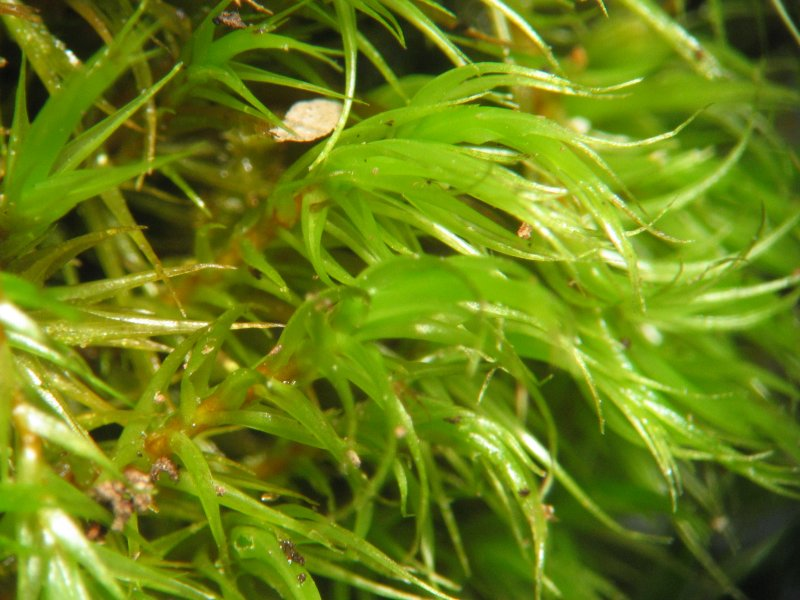
Close-up

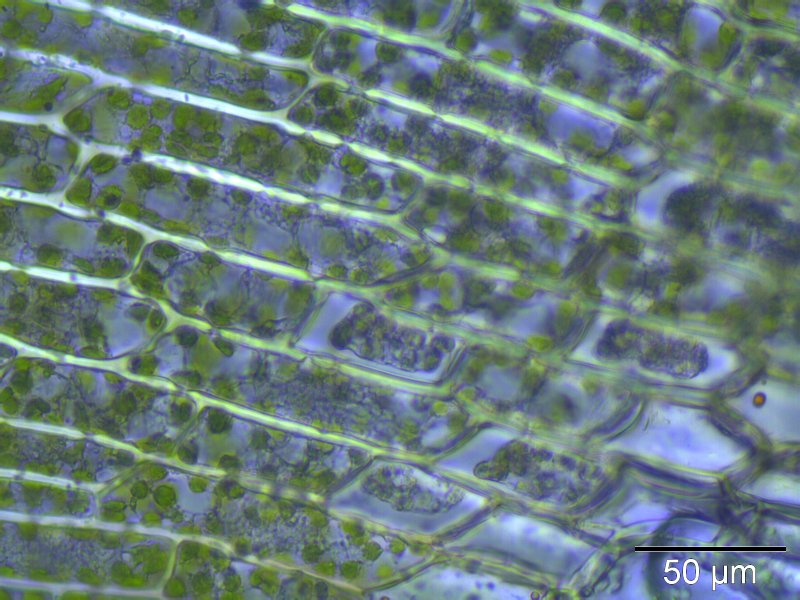
Lamina cells 400×

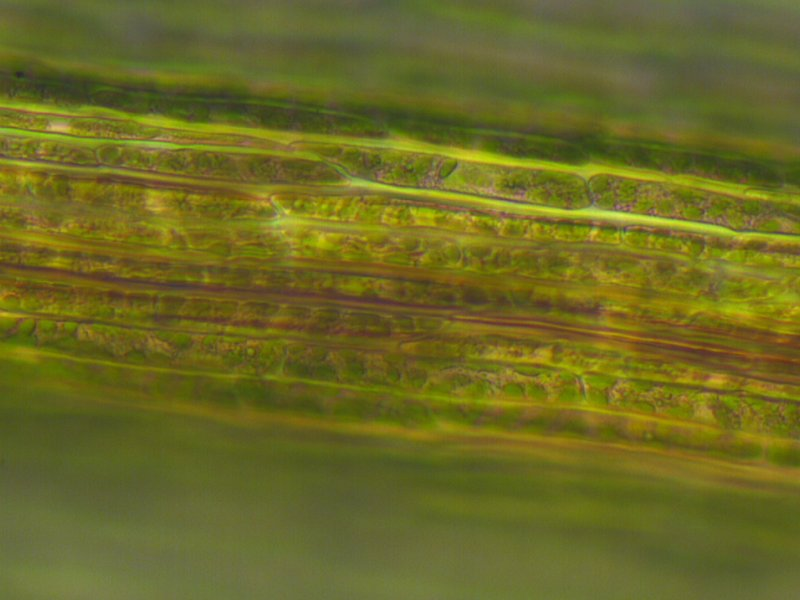
Middle ridge 200×
