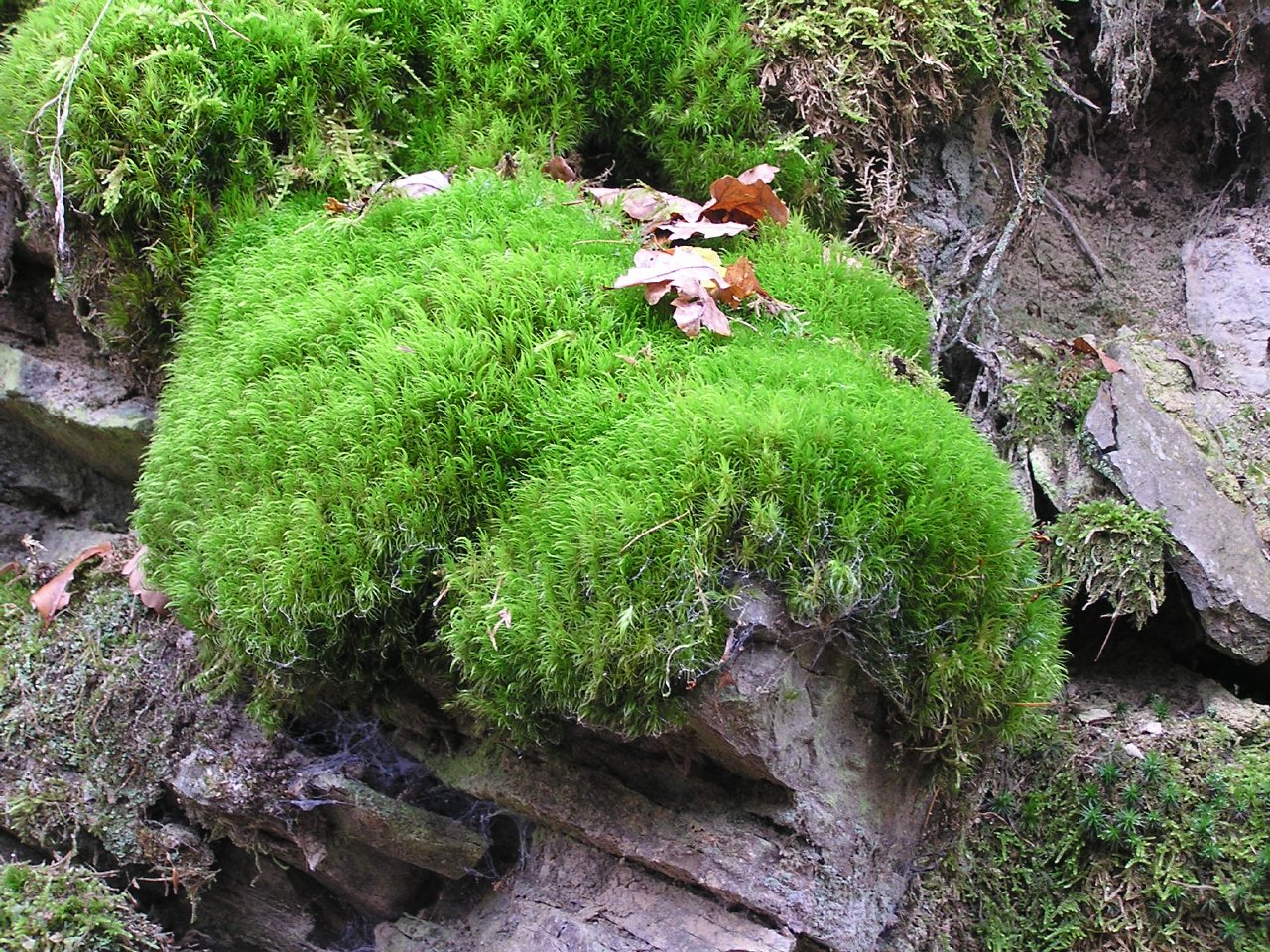
- Dicranum scoparium

Scientific classification
- Kingdom: Plantae
- Division: Bryophyta
- Class: Bryopsida
- Subclass: Dicranidae
- Order: Dicranales
- Family: Dicranaceae; Schimp.

Genera
- See Classification

= Dicranaceae =

Family of haplolepideous mosses

Dicranaceae is a family of haplolepideous mosses (Dicranidae) in class Bryopsida. Species within this family are dioicous. Genera in this family include Dicranum, Dicranoloma, and Mitrobryum.

== Classification ==
The family Dicranaceae contains the following genera:

- Anisothecium Mitt.
- Aongstroemia Bruch & Schimp.
- Aongstroemiopsis M. Fleisch.
- Braunfelsia Paris
- Brotherobryum M. Fleisch.
- Bryotestua Thér. & P. de la Varde
- Camptodontium Dusén
- Campylopodium (Müll. Hal.) Besch.
- Chorisodontium (Mitt.) Broth.
- Cnestrum I. Hagen
- Cryptodicranum E. B. Bartram
- Dicnemon Schwägr.
- Dicranella (Müll. Hal.) Schimp.
- Dicranoloma (Renauld) Renauld
- Dicranum Hedw.
- Diobelonella Ochyra
- Eucamptodon Mont.
- Eucamptodontopsis Broth.
- Holomitriopsis H. Rob.
- Holomitrium Brid.
- Hygrodicranum Cardot
- Leptotrichella (Müll. Hal.) Lindb.
- Leucoloma Brid.
- Macrodictyum (Broth.) E. H. Hegew.
- Mesotus Mitt.
- Mitrobryum H. Rob.
- Muscoherzogia Ochyra
- Orthodicranum (Bruch & Schimp.) Loeske
- Paraleucobryum (Limpr.) Loeske
- Parisia Broth.
- Phantomia S. He & W.R. Buck
- Platyneuron (Cardot) Broth.
- Pocsiella Bizot
- Polymerodon Herzog
- Pseudephemerum (Lindb.) I. Hagen
- Pseudochorisodontium (Broth.) C. H. Gao, Vitt, X. H. Fu & T. Cao
- Schliephackea Müll. Hal.
- Sclerodontium Schwägr.
- Sphaerothecium Hampe
- Steyermarkiella H. Rob.
- Wardia Harv. & Hook.
- Werneriobryum Herzog

== Other sources ==
- Müller, P. and J.-P. Frahm. 1987. A review of the Paraleucobryoideae (Dicranaceae). Nova Hedwigia 45: 283–314.
