= List of Canadian plants by family D =

Main page: List of Canadian plants by family

The following families of vascular plants are listed as occurring in Canada:

For mosses of Canada, see:

== Daltoniaceae ==
- Daltonia splachnoides

== Dennstaedtiaceae ==
- Dennstaedtia punctilobula — eastern hay-scented fern
- Pteridium aquilinum — bracken fern

== Diapensiaceae ==
- Diapensia lapponica — Lapland diapensia

== Dicranaceae ==
- Aongstroemia longipes
- Arctoa anderssonii
- Arctoa fulvella
- Arctoa hyperborea
- Campylopus arctocarpus
- Campylopus atrovirens — cliff campylopus
- Campylopus flexuosus
- Campylopus fragilis
- Campylopus japonicus
- Campylopus paradoxus — paradoxical campylopus
- Campylopus schimperi
- Campylopus schwarzii
- Campylopus subulatus
- Cynodontium alpestre
- Cynodontium glaucescens
- Cynodontium jenneri
- Cynodontium polycarpon
- Cynodontium schisti
- Cynodontium strumiferum
- Cynodontium tenellum
- Dichodontium olympicum
- Dichodontium pellucidum — dichodontium moss
- Dicranella cerviculata
- Dicranella crispa
- Dicranella grevilleana
- Dicranella heteromalla
- Dicranella howei
- Dicranella pacifica
- Dicranella palustris
- Dicranella rufescens
- Dicranella schreberiana
- Dicranella stickinensis
- Dicranella subulata
- Dicranella varia
- Dicranodontium asperulum
- Dicranodontium denudatum
- Dicranodontium subporodictyon
- Dicranodontium uncinatum
- Dicranoweisia cirrata
- Dicranoweisia crispula
- Dicranum acutifolium
- Dicranum angustum
- Dicranum bonjeanii
- Dicranum brevifolium
- Dicranum condensatum — condensed dicranum moss
- Dicranum elongatum — broom-moss
- Dicranum flagellare — whip fork moss
- Dicranum fragilifolium
- Dicranum fulvum
- Dicranum fuscescens — dicranum moss
- Dicranum groenlandicum
- Dicranum howellii
- Dicranum leioneuron
- Dicranum majus
- Dicranum montanum — montane dicranum moss
- Dicranum muehlenbeckii
- Dicranum ontariense — Ontario dicranum moss
- Dicranum pallidisetum
- Dicranum polysetum — waxyleaf moss
- Dicranum scoparium — broom moss
- Dicranum spadiceum
- Dicranum spurium
- Dicranum tauricum
- Dicranum undulatum — bog broom moss
- Dicranum viride
- Kiaeria blyttii
- Kiaeria falcata
- Kiaeria glacialis
- Kiaeria starkei
- Oncophorus virens
- Oncophorus wahlenbergii
- Oreas martiana
- Paraleucobryum enerve
- Paraleucobryum longifolium
- Rhabdoweisia crispata

== Dioscoreaceae ==
- Dioscorea quaternata — fourleaf yam

== Disceliaceae ==
- Discelium nudum

== Ditrichaceae ==
- Ceratodon purpureus
- Distichium capillaceum
- Distichium hagenii
- Distichium inclinatum
- Ditrichum ambiguum — ambiguous ditrichum
- Ditrichum flexicaule
- Ditrichum heteromallum
- Ditrichum lineare
- Ditrichum montanum
- Ditrichum pallidum
- Ditrichum pusillum
- Ditrichum rhynchostegium
- Ditrichum schimperi
- Ditrichum zonatum
- Pleuridium acuminatum
- Pleuridium palustre
- Pleuridium subulatum
- Saelania glaucescens — blue dew moss
- Trichodon cylindricus

== Droseraceae ==
- Drosera anglica — English sundew
- Drosera filiformis — threadleaf sundew
- Drosera intermedia — spoon-leaved sundew
- Drosera linearis — slenderleaf sundew
- Drosera rotundifolia — roundleaf sundew
- Drosera x belezeana
- Drosera x obovata

== Dryopteridaceae ==
- Dryopteris arguta — coastal woodfern
- Dryopteris campyloptera — mountain woodfern
- Dryopteris carthusiana — spinulose shieldfern
- Dryopteris clintoniana — Clinton's woodfern
- Dryopteris cristata — crested shieldfern
- Dryopteris expansa — spreading woodfern
- Dryopteris filix-mas — male fern
- Dryopteris fragrans — fragrant cliff woodfern
- Dryopteris goldieana — Goldie's woodfern
- Dryopteris intermedia — evergreen woodfern
- Dryopteris marginalis — marginal woodfern
- Dryopteris x algonquinensis
- Dryopteris x benedictii
- Dryopteris x boottii
- Dryopteris x burgessii
- Dryopteris x dowellii
- Dryopteris x mickelii
- Dryopteris x neowherryi
- Dryopteris x pittsfordensis
- Dryopteris x slossoniae
- Dryopteris x triploidea
- Dryopteris x uliginosa
- Matteuccia struthiopteris — ostrich fern
- Onoclea sensibilis — sensitive fern
- Polystichum acrostichoides — Christmas fern
- Polystichum andersonii — Anderson's holly fern
- Polystichum braunii — Braun's holly fern
- Polystichum imbricans — narrowleaf swordfern
- Polystichum kruckebergii — Kruckeberg's swordfern
- Polystichum kwakiutlii — Kwakiutl's holly fern
- Polystichum lemmonii — Shasta fern
- Polystichum lonchitis — northern holly fern
- Polystichum munitum — western swordfern
- Polystichum scopulinum — mountain holly fern
- Polystichum setigerum — Alaska holly fern
- Polystichum x hagenahii
- Polystichum x potteri
