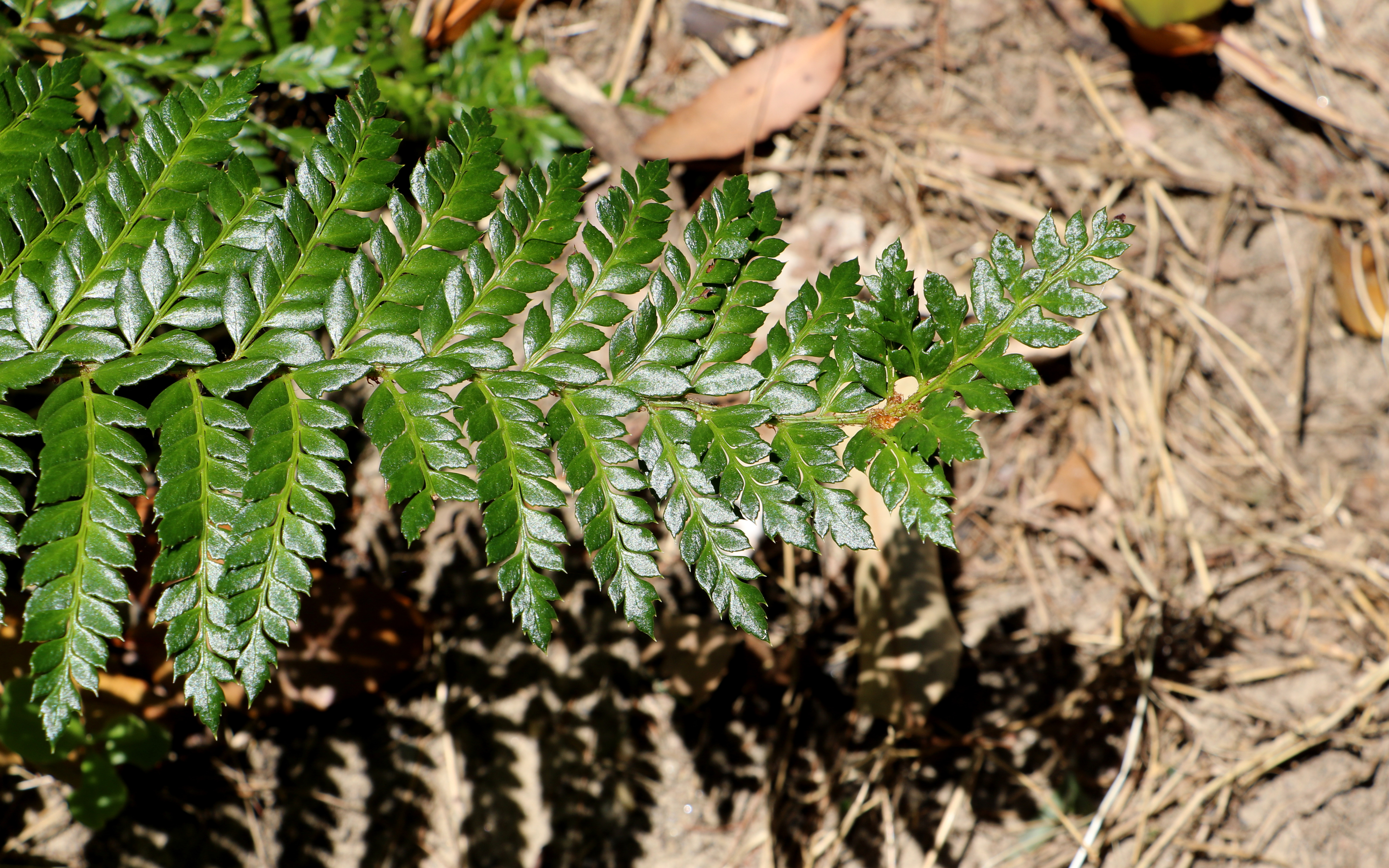
- harsh shield fern at Narrabeen, Australia

Scientific classification
- Kingdom: Plantae
- Clade: Tracheophytes
- Division: Polypodiophyta
- Class: Polypodiopsida
- Order: Polypodiales
- Suborder: Polypodiineae
- Family: Dryopteridaceae
- Genus: Polystichum
- Species: P. australiense

Binomial name
- Polystichum australiense Tindale

= Polystichum australiense =

harsh shield fern

Species of fern

Polystichum australiense, commonly known as the harsh shield fern is a plant found in New South Wales, Australia. The genus name Polystichum is derived from Greek poly - many, and stichos - rows referring to the many rows of sori. The specific epithet refers to Australia. An unusual feature is the growth of bulbils on end of the fronds. Sori are circular with a brown indusium, the stem is moderately scaly. Fronds are tough, having ultimate segments with distinctly aristate margins.

Seen in warmer sites, unlike the related Polystichum proliferum which usually prefers mountain habitats. The type specimen was collected at Garie Beach, and first appeared in a botanic publication in 1954, authored by Mary Tindale.
