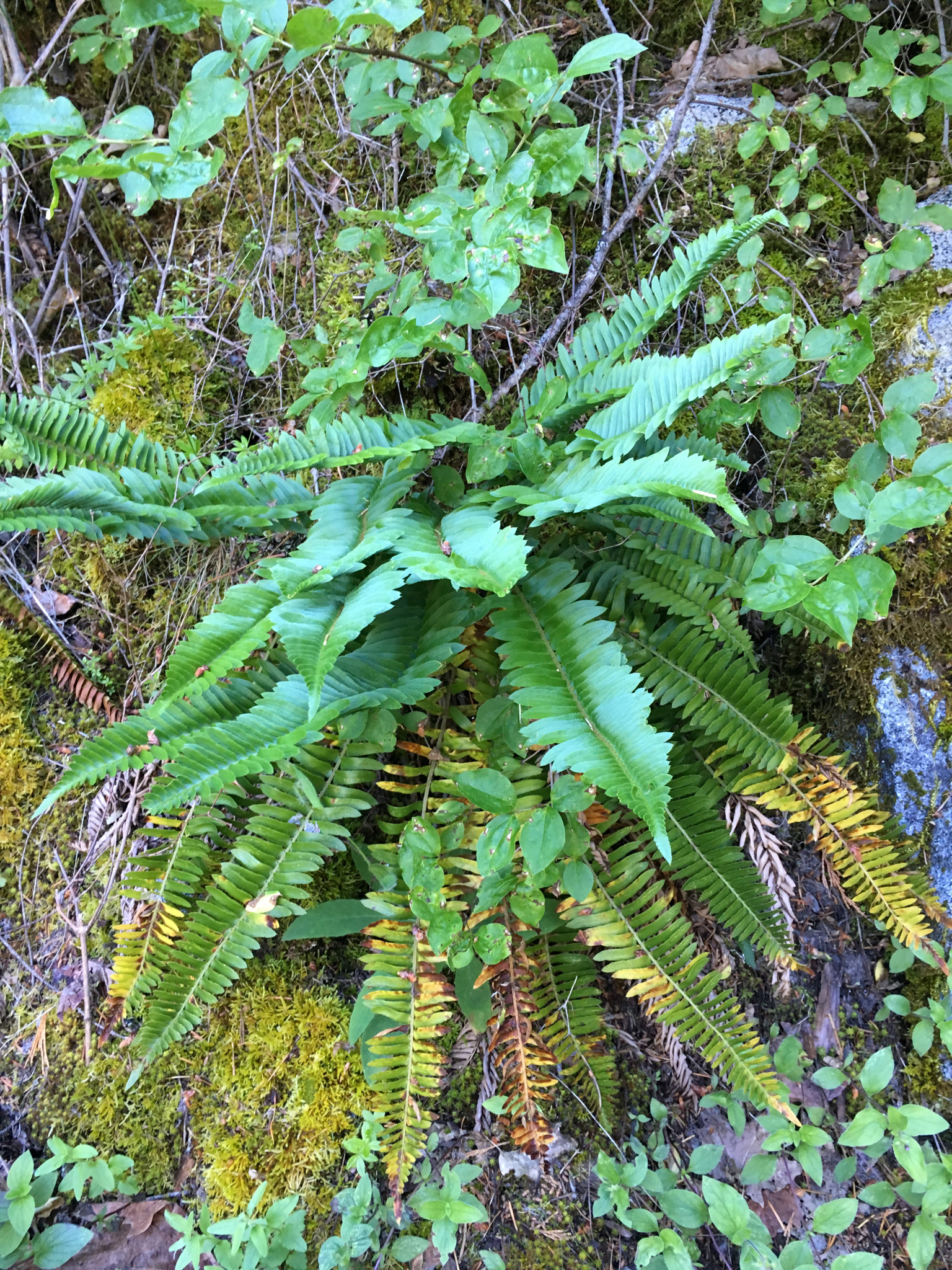

Scientific classification
- Kingdom: Plantae
- Clade: Tracheophytes
- Division: Polypodiophyta
- Class: Polypodiopsida
- Order: Polypodiales
- Suborder: Polypodiineae
- Family: Dryopteridaceae
- Genus: Polystichum
- Species: P. imbricans

Binomial name
- Polystichum imbricans (D.C.Eaton) D.H.Wagner

= Polystichum imbricans =

Species of fern

Polystichum imbricans is a species of fern known by the common names narrowleaf swordfern and imbricate sword fern. It is native to western North America from British Columbia and Idaho to southern California, where it grows in rocky soil and cracks in rock outcrops in coastal and inland mountain ranges and foothills.

== Description ==
This fern produces several erect linear or lance-shaped leaves up to 80 centimeters long. Each leaf is made up of many narrow, overlapping, sometimes twisting leaflets each 2 to 4 centimeters long. The leaflets have toothed edges. The round sori occupy two rows on either side of the midrib of each pinna and are covered by a centrally-attached, umbrella-like indusium. It is distinguished from Polystichum munitum primarily by the narrower leaves due to less elongate leaflets, usually with an apiculate tip.

This fern readily forms hybrids, some of which are fertile and are considered separate species, such as Polystichum californicum, its hybrid with P. dudleyi.

== Etymology ==
The specific name imbricans refers to the overlapping (imbricate) leaflets, from the Latin imbricatus.

== Gallery ==
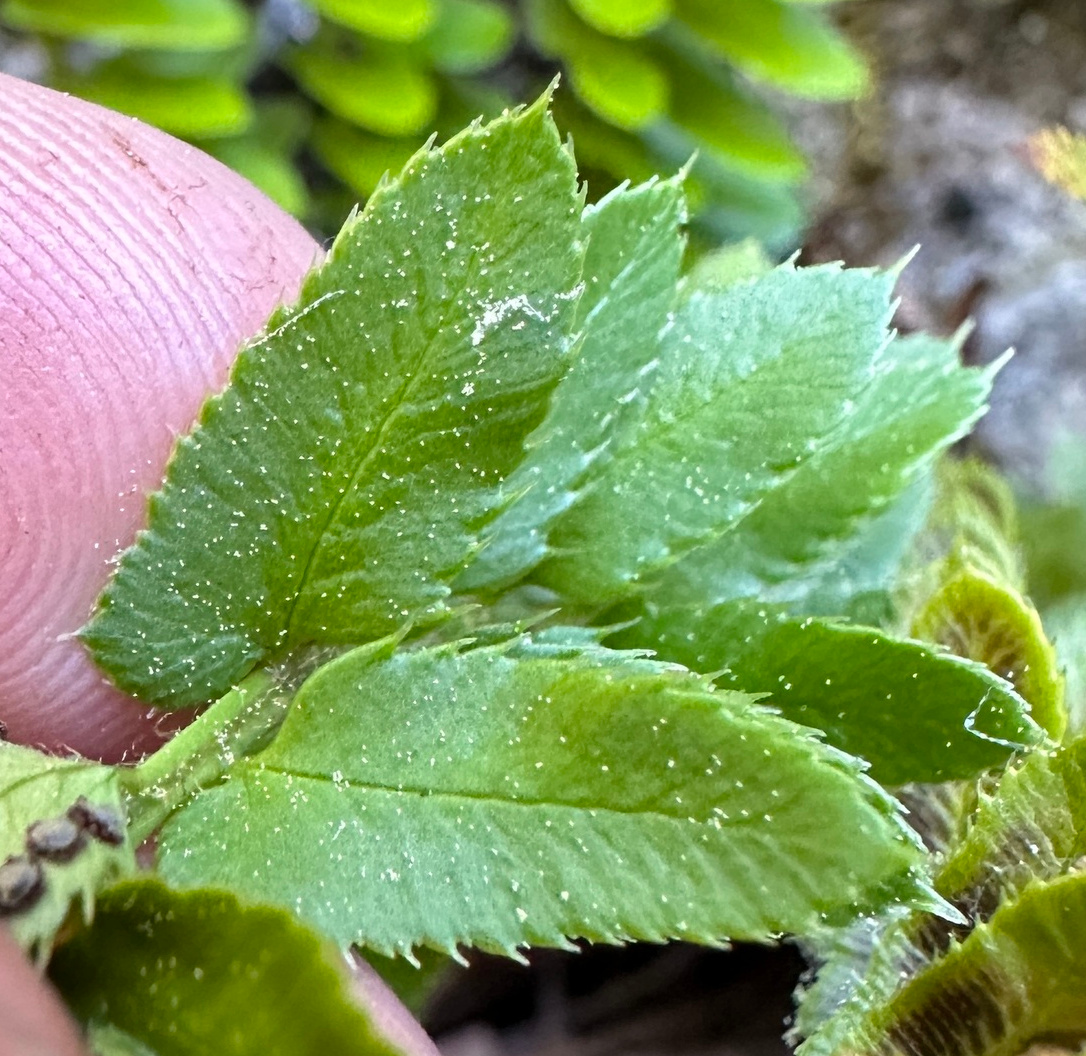
Pinna (leaflet) shape
