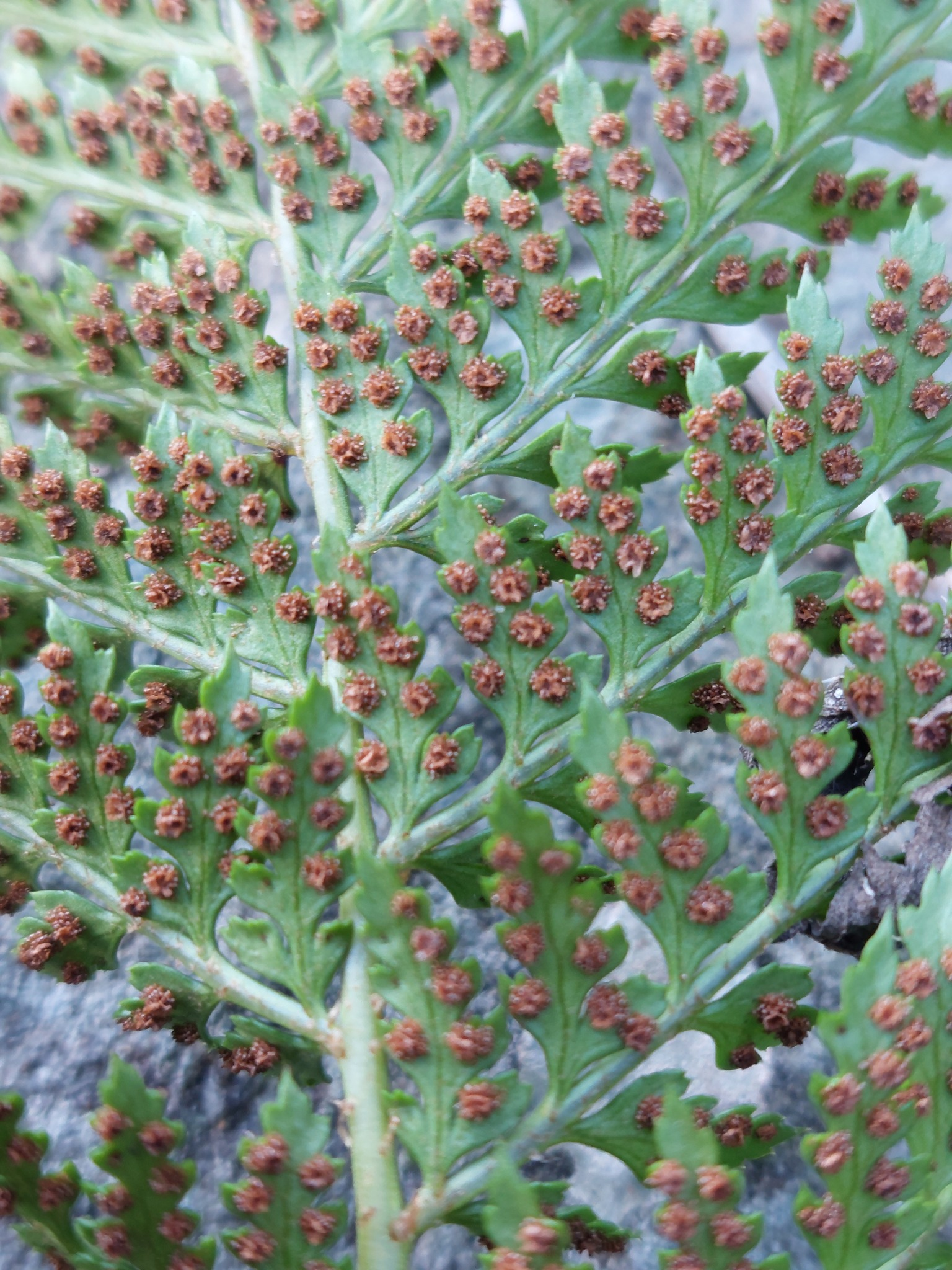
- Growing at Mount Kaputar

Scientific classification
- Kingdom: Plantae
- Clade: Tracheophytes
- Division: Polypodiophyta
- Class: Polypodiopsida
- Order: Polypodiales
- Suborder: Polypodiineae
- Family: Dryopteridaceae
- Genus: Polystichum
- Species: P. fallax

Binomial name
- Polystichum fallax Tindale

= Polystichum fallax =

Species of fern

Polystichum fallax is a species of fern in the Dryopteridaceae family, and was first described in 1955 by Mary Tindale.

The species is found from south-eastern Queensland to eastern New South Wales, in open forest at moderate heights above sea level and often among rocks.

== Images ==
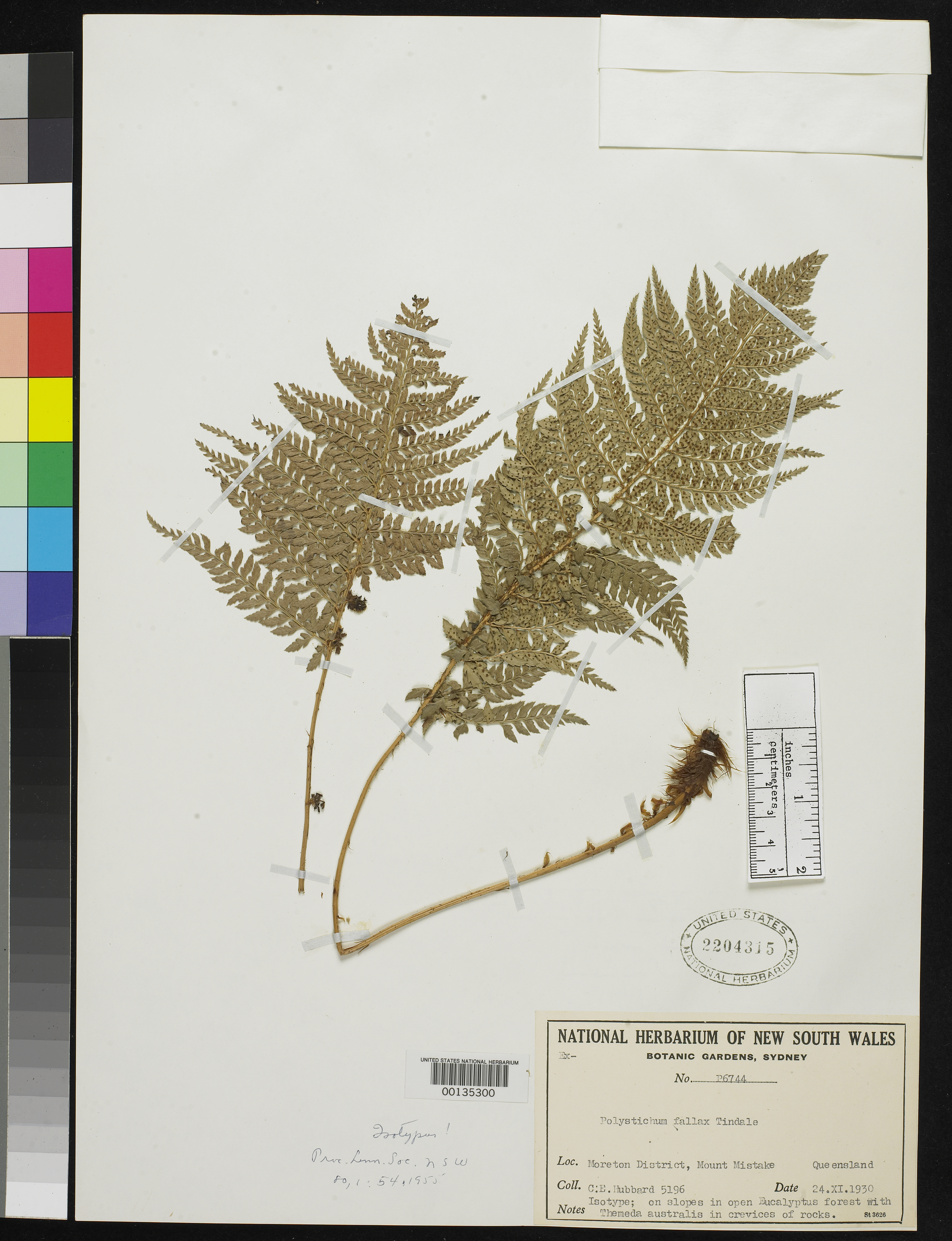

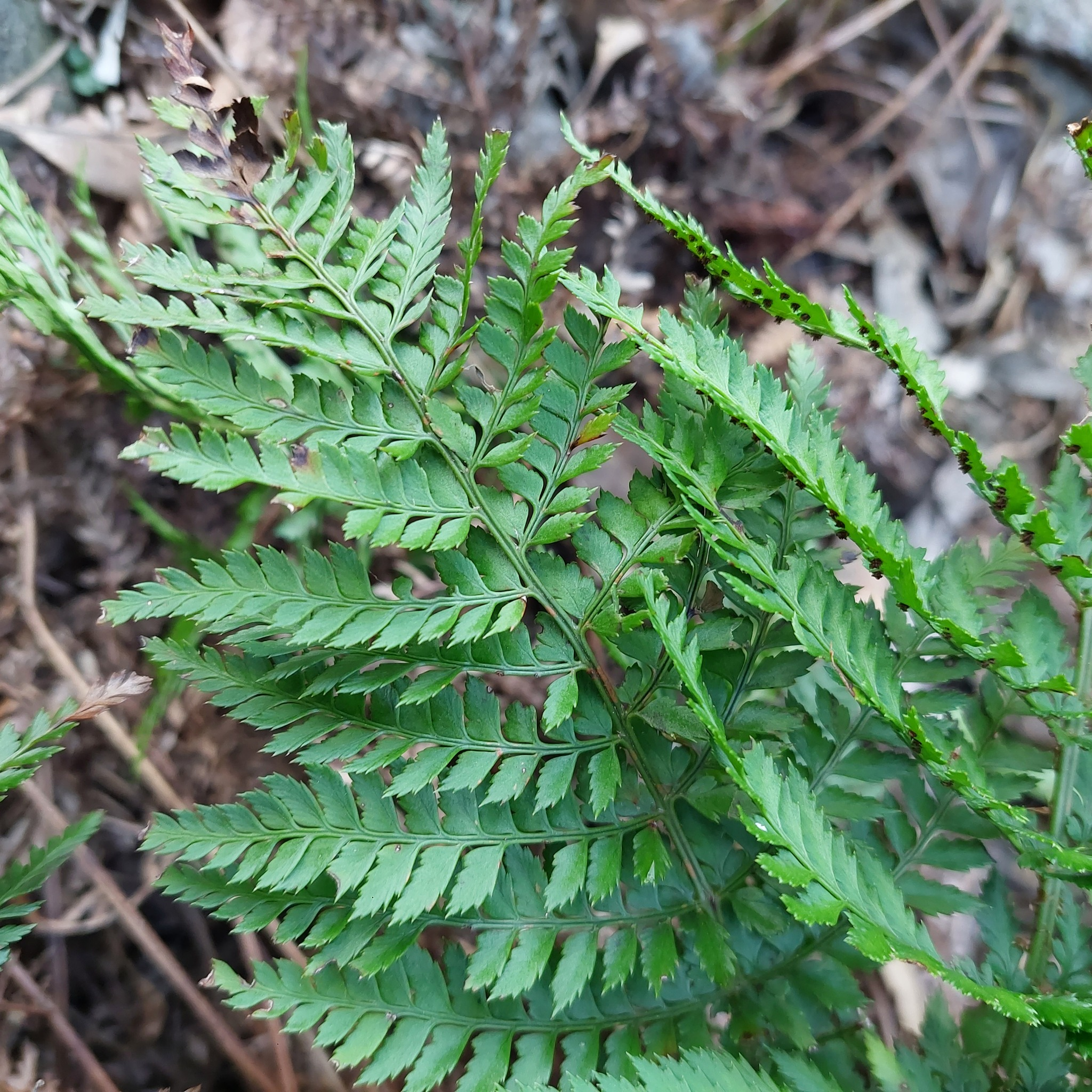
