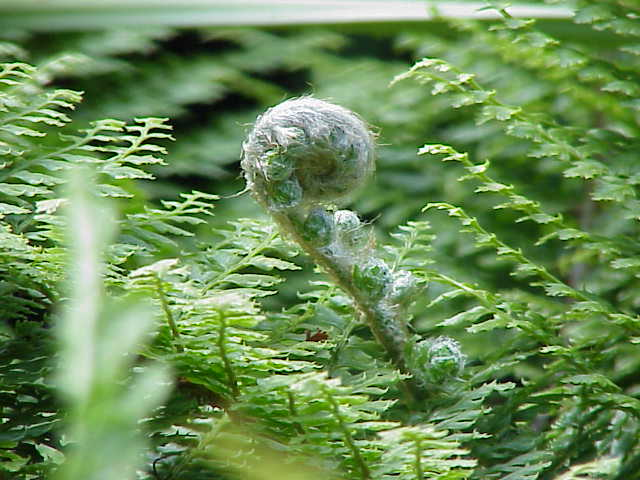

Scientific classification
- Kingdom: Plantae
- Clade: Tracheophytes
- Division: Polypodiophyta
- Class: Polypodiopsida
- Order: Polypodiales
- Suborder: Polypodiineae
- Family: Dryopteridaceae
- Genus: Polystichum
- Species: P. setiferum

Binomial name
- Polystichum setiferum (Forssk.) Woynar

= Polystichum setiferum =

Species of fern

Polystichum setiferum, or the soft shield fern, is an evergreen or semi-evergreen fern native to southern and western Europe. The stalks and most midribs are coated with cinnamon-brown scales. The Latin specific epithet setiferum means "with bristles".

== Distribution ==
It is most abundant in Ireland, southwestern Great Britain, western France and northwest Iberia, where it benefits from the combination of mild winters and moist summers, but also occurs more locally north to northern Scotland and east to the Crimea and Turkey; in the Mediterranean it usually grows at high altitudes. It grows in woodlands, often but not always on steep slopes.

== Description ==
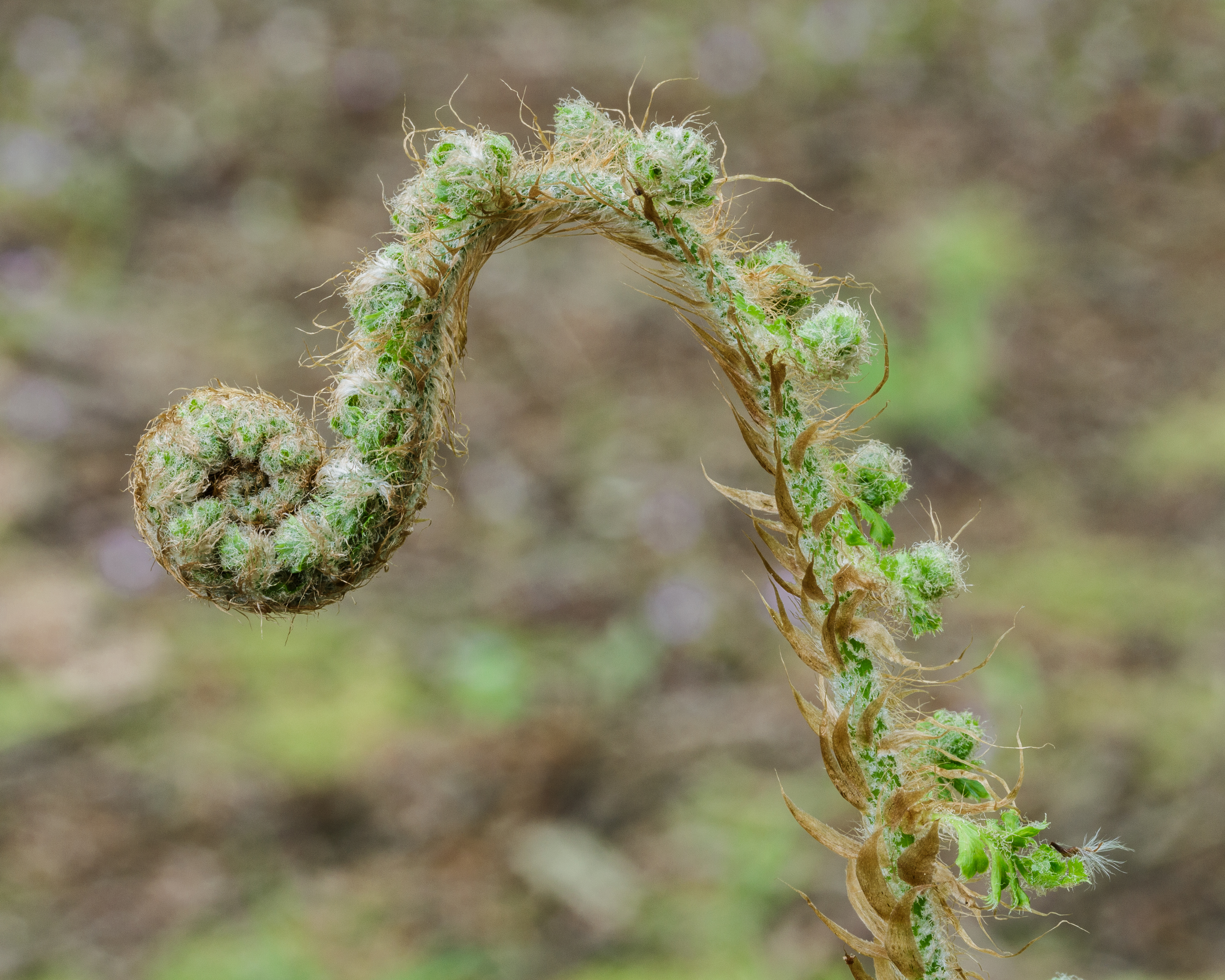
Close-up of new leaf

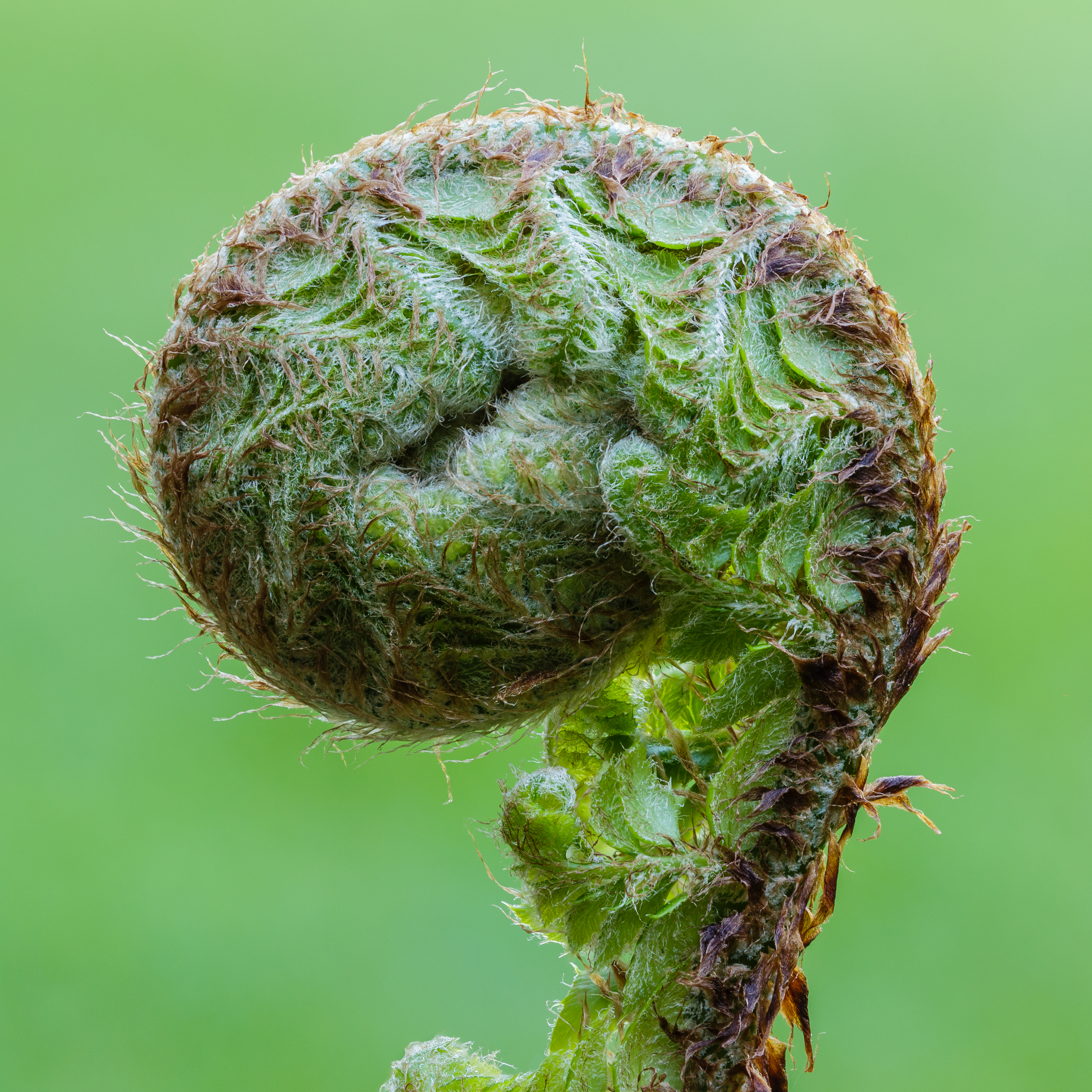
Close-up of new leaf from Polystichum setiferum 'Herrenhausen'

The fern's bright green fronds are 30–120 cm (12–47 in) long, usually drooping downslope, with typically four to ten fronds on a mature plant. The fronds are soft-textured, bipinnate (single-pinnate on small, young plants), with the pinnae opposite on the stalk. Each pinna is 4–14 cm (2–6 in) long, with a large upward-pointing pinnule at the base, and the other pinnules decreasing in size toward the pinna tip; the pinnules have softly bristly tips. Individual fronds remain lush and fresh-looking throughout the season. They live for nine to fifteen months and remain attached to the rhizome after withering. The round sori occupy two rows on either side of the midrib of each pinnule and are covered by a centrally-attached, umbrella-like indusium with fringed edges. They produce light yellow spores.

== Cultivation ==
Polystichum setiferum is frequently cultivated as an ornamental plant for use in gardens. There are many cultivars available: over 300 have been described although most are no longer in cultivation or not considered sufficiently distinct for an individual name. The following cultivars have gained the Royal Horticultural Society's Award of Garden Merit:

- Divisilobum Group
  - 'Divisilobum Densum'
  - 'Divisilobum Iveryanum'
