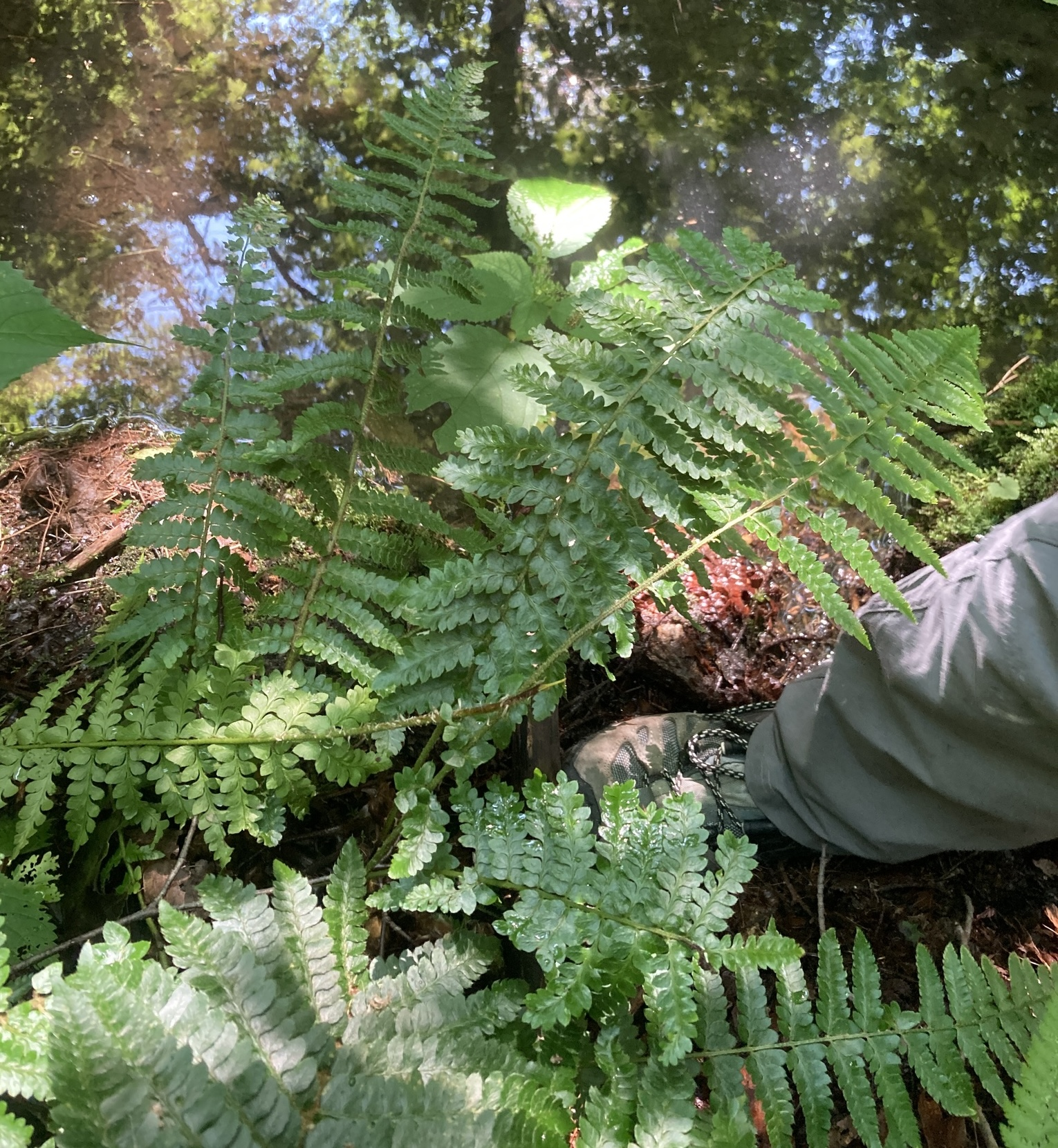

Scientific classification
- Kingdom: Plantae
- Clade: Tracheophytes
- Division: Polypodiophyta
- Class: Polypodiopsida
- Order: Polypodiales
- Suborder: Polypodiineae
- Family: Dryopteridaceae
- Genus: Polystichum
- Species: P. × potteri

Binomial name
- Polystichum × potteri Barrington
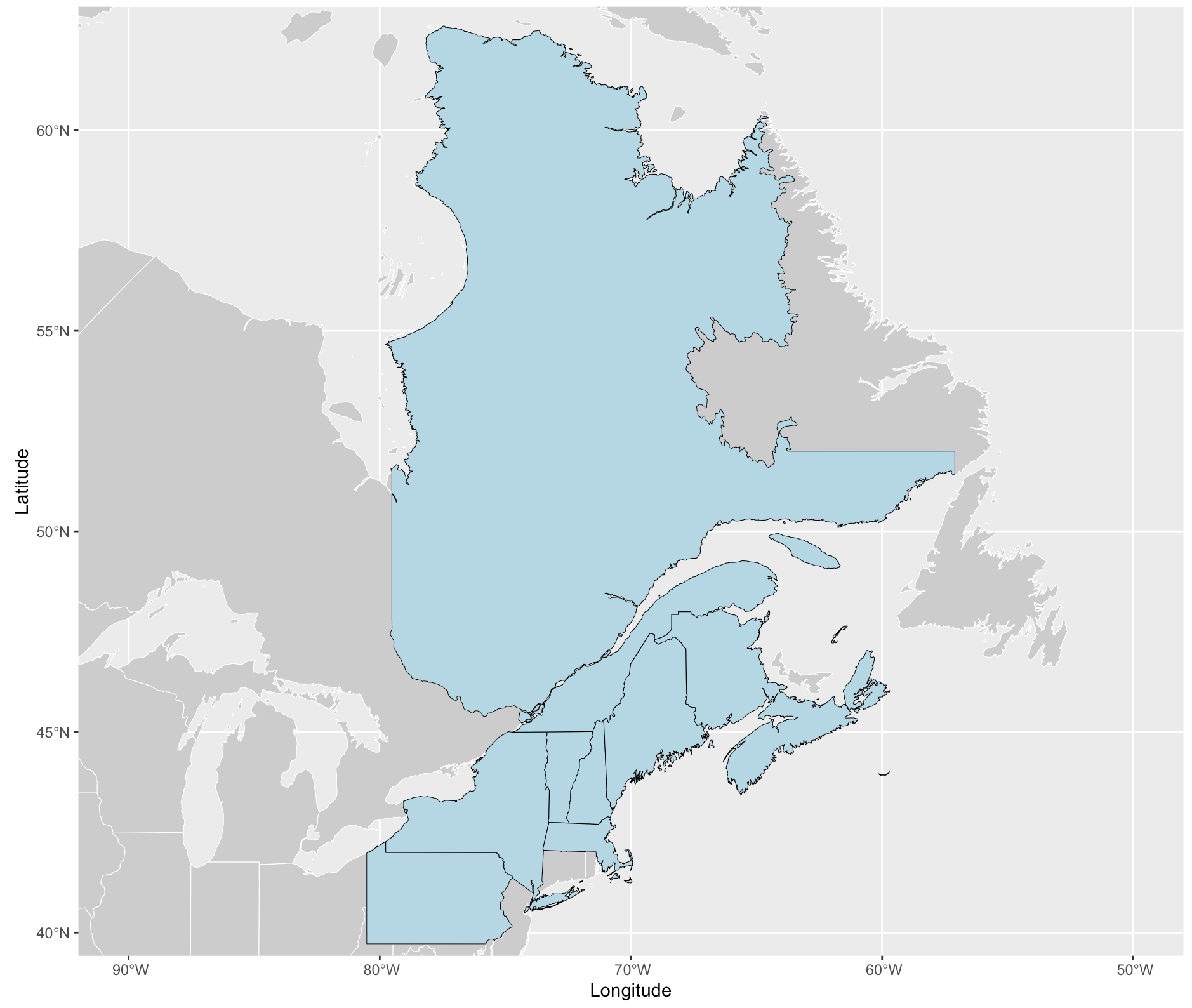

= Polystichum × potteri =

Hybrid species of plant

Polystichum × potteri, known as Potter's holly fern, is a hybrid between Polystichum braunii and Polystichum acrostichoides. It is named for Henry Potter, a Vermont farmer and botanist.

== Range ==
Potter's holly fern has been documented in Vermont, New Hampshire, New York, Pennsylvania, Maine, Massachusetts, Quebec, Nova Scotia, and New Brunswick.

== Taxonomy ==
Though formally described by David Barrington in 1986, this hybrid was first reported in 1940 by Thompson and Coffin.
