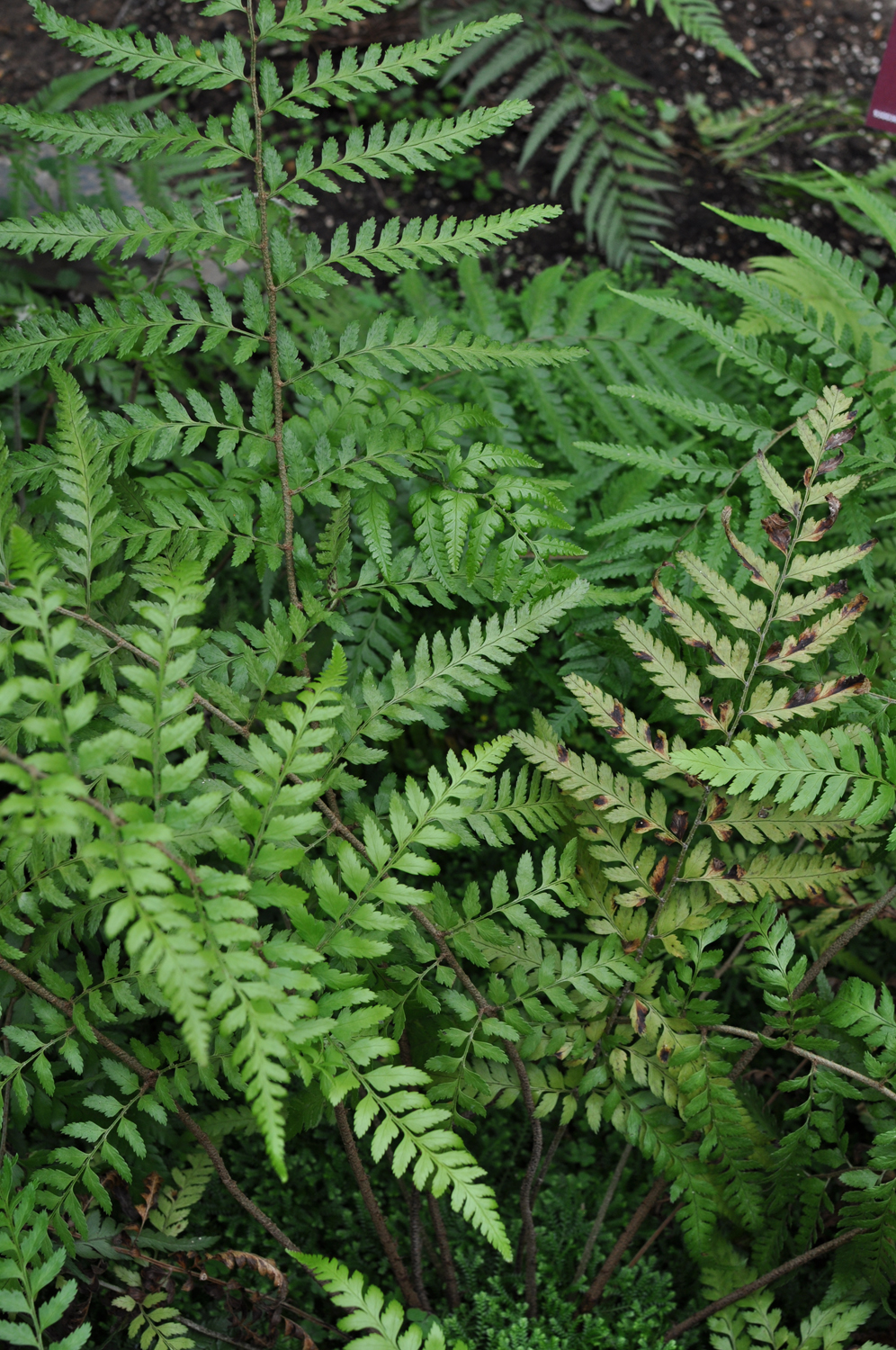

Conservation status
- Critically Endangered (IUCN 3.1)

Scientific classification
- Kingdom: Plantae
- Clade: Tracheophytes
- Division: Polypodiophyta
- Class: Polypodiopsida
- Order: Polypodiales
- Suborder: Polypodiineae
- Family: Dryopteridaceae
- Genus: Polystichum
- Species: P. drepanum

Binomial name
- Polystichum drepanum (Sw.) C.Presl

= Polystichum drepanum =

Species of plant

Polystichum drepanum, also known as Madeira shield-fern, is a species of fern in the Dryopteridaceae family.

It is native to Madeira. Its natural habitat is subtropical moist lowland forests. It is threatened by habitat loss.

== Taxonomy ==
It was first described by Olof Swartz as Aspidium drepanum in 1801, and was moved to the genus Polystichum by Carl Borivoj Presl in 1836.
