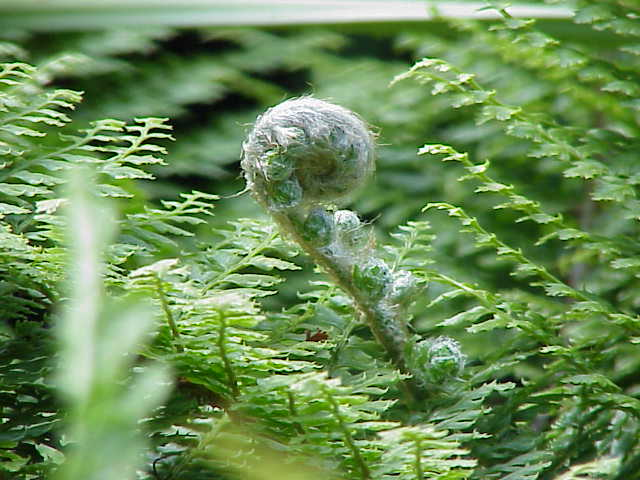
- Polystichum setiferum

Scientific classification
- Kingdom: Plantae
- Clade: Tracheophytes
- Division: Polypodiophyta
- Class: Polypodiopsida
- Order: Polypodiales
- Suborder: Polypodiineae
- Family: Dryopteridaceae
- Subfamily: Dryopteridoideae
- Genus: Polystichum; Roth

Species
- See text.

Synonyms
- Acropelta T.Nakai; Adenoderris J.Sm.; Aetopteron Ehrh. ex House; Hemesteum H.Lév.; Hypopeltis Michx.; Papuapteris C. Chr.; Phanerophlebia C. Presl; Plecosorus Fée; Sorolepidium Christ

= Polystichum =

Polystichum Temporal range: Early Pliocene to Present

Genus of ferns

Polystichum is a genus of ferns in the family Dryopteridaceae, subfamily Dryopteridoideae, according to the Pteridophyte Phylogeny Group classification of 2016 (PPG I). The genus has about 500 species and has a cosmopolitan distribution. The highest diversity is in eastern Asia, with about 208 species in China alone; the region from Mexico to Brazil has at least 100 additional species; Africa (at least 17 species), North America (at least 18 species), and Europe (at least 5 species) have much lower diversity. Polystichum species are terrestrial or rock-dwelling ferns of warm-temperate and montane-tropical regions (a few species grow in alpine regions). They are often found in disturbed habitats such as road cuts, talus slopes, and stream banks. The genus also contains one extinct species from the early Pliocene of Peru: Polystichum espinarensis

== Description ==
Many ferns of this genus have stout, slowly creeping rootstocks that form a crown, with a vase-like ring of evergreen fronds 30 to 200 centimetres (10 to 80 in) long. The sori are round, with a circular indusium, except in South American species which lack an indusium. The stipes have prominent scales and often have hair-like cilia, but they lack any true hairs. The genus differs from the well-known and allied fern genus Dryopteris in the indusium being circular, not reniform, and in having the leaf segments with auricles—asymmetrical blades where one side of the segment is much longer than the other at the base.

=== Apomixis ===
Apomixis, the development of an embryo without the occurrence of fertilization, is particularly common among ferns. Apomixis evolved several times independently in three different clades of polystichoid ferns.

== Taxonomy ==
Polystichum is one of the 10 largest fern genera and is grouped within the Dryopteridaceae. Polystichum s.l. is well defined as its own monophyletic group, including species from the genera Cyrtomidictyum, Cyrtogonellum, Cyrtomium, and Phanerophlebia. Research concerning taxonomy within Polystichum s.s. is ongoing, with high levels of hybridization, allopolyploidy, and apomixis making distinctions difficult. Based on genetic analysis Little & Barrington (2003) originally defined a monophyletic Polystichum s.s. by removing Cyrtomium as its own genus. It was further separated by Li et al. (2008) into a separate clade along with Phanerophlebia.

=== Selected species ===
The genus has a large number of species. The PPG I classification suggested that there were about 500 species; as of October 2026, the Checklist of Ferns and Lycophytes of the World listed 440 species and 70 hybrids, noting that "many undescribed species remain". The genus Polystichum includes, but is not limited to, the following species. In this list, a species name preceded by (=) is considered to be a synonym of the accepted species name above it.

- Polystichum acanthophyllum (Franch.) H. Christ
- Polystichum acrostichoides (Michx.) Schott – Christmas fern
- Polystichum aculeatum (L.) Roth ex Mert. – Hard shield fern
- Polystichum acutidens H.Christ
- Polystichum acutipinnulum Ching & K.H.Shing
  (=) Polystichum wuyishanense Ching & K.H.Shing
- Polystichum alcicorne (Baker) Diels
- Polystichum aleuticum C.Chr. – Aleutian shield fern
- Polystichum andersonii Hopkins – Anderson's hollyfern
- Polystichum atkinsonii Bedd.
- Polystichum australiense Tindale
- Polystichum bakerianum (Atk. ex C.B.Clarke) Diels
- Polystichum biaristatum (Blume) T.Moore
- Polystichum bomiense Ching & S.K.Wu
- Polystichum bonapartii Rosenst.
- Polystichum bonseyi W.H.Wagner & Hobdy – Bonsey's Hollyfern
- Polystichum brachypterum (J.F.Gmel.) C.Chr. – Rusty swordfern
- Polystichum braunii (Spenner) Fée – Braun's shield fern, Braun's hollyfern
- Polystichum brachypterum (Kunze) Ching
  (=) Polystichum garhwalicum N.C.Nair & Nag
- Polystichum bulbiferum Barrington
- Polystichum calderonense Proctor – Monte Guilarte hollyfern
- Polystichum californicum Diels – California sword fern
- Polystichum capillipes (Baker) Diels
  (=) Polystichum michelii H.Christ
  (=) Polystichum minusculum H.Christ
  (=) Polystichum molliculum H.Christ
- Polystichum castaneum (C.B.Clarke) B.K.Nayar & S.Kaur
- Polystichum chilense (H.Chr.) Diels
- Polystichum christii Ching
- Polystichum chunii Ching
- Polystichum craspedosorum (Maxim.) Diels
- Polystichum cyclolobum C.Chr.
- Polystichum cystostegia (Hook.) J.B.Armstr. – Alpine shield fern
- Polystichum deltodon (Baker) Diels
- Polystichum dielsii H.Christ
- Polystichum discretum (D.Don) J.Sm.
- Polystichum drepanum (Sw.) C.Presl
- Polystichum dudleyi Maxon – Dudley's sword fern
- Polystichum duthiei (C.Hope) C.Chr.
  (=) Polystichum tsuchuense Ching
- Polystichum echinatum (J.F.Gmel.) C.Chr. – Rusty swordfern
- Polystichum erosum Ching
- Polystichum excellens Ching
- Polystichum eximium (Mett. ex Kuhn) C.Chr.
  (=) Polystichum tialooshanense Ching
- Polystichum falcatipinnum Hayata
- Polystichum falcinellum C.Presl
- Polystichum fallax Tindale
- Polystichum formosanum Rosenst.
- Polystichum glandulosum C.Presl
- Polystichum gongboense Ching & S.K.Wu
  (=) Polystichum rarum Ching & S.K.Wu
- Polystichum grandifrons C.Chr.
  (=) Polystichum kiusiuense Tagawa
- Polystichum gymnocarpium Ching ex W.M.Chu & Z.R.He 2001
- Polystichum haleakalense Brack. – Island swordfern
- Polystichum hancockii (Hance) Diels
- Polystichum hecatopteron Diels
- Polystichum herbaceum Ching & Z.Y.Liu
- Polystichum imbricans (D.C. Eaton) D.H.Wagner – Narrowleaf sword fern
- Polystichum incongruum J.P. Roux
- Polystichum kruckebergii W.H.Wagner – Kruckeberg's sword fern/holly fern
- Polystichum kwakiutlii D.H.Wagner
- Polystichum lachenense (Hook.) Bedd.
- Polystichum lanceolatum Baker
- Polystichum lemmonii Underw. – Lemmon's holly fern, Shasta fern
- Polystichum lentum (D. Don) T. Moore
- Polystichum lonchitis (L.) Roth – Holly fern
- Polystichum longidens Ching & S.K.Wu
- Polystichum longipaleatum H.Christ
- Polystichum longipes Maxon
- Polystichum luctuosum (Kunze) T. Moore – Mourning shield fern
- Polystichum macleae (Baker) Diels
- Polystichum macrochlaenum Ching & S.K.Wu
- Polystichum makinoi (Tagawa) Tagawa
- Polystichum martini H.Christ
- Polystichum mayebarae Tagawa
- Polystichum mediocre Ching & S.K.Wu
- Polystichum medogense Ching & S.K.Wu
- Polystichum microchlamys (H.Christ) Matsum.
- Polystichum mohrioides (Bory ex Willd.) C.Presl
- Polystichum mollissimum Ching
- Polystichum monticola N.C.Anthony & Schelpe – Mountain shield fern
- Polystichum moorei H.Christ
- Polystichum morii Hayata
- Polystichum moupinense (Franch.) Bedd.
  (=) Polystichum woodsioides H.Christ
- Polystichum munitum (Kaulf.) C. Presl – Western sword fern
  (=) Polystichum solitarium (Maxon) Underw. ex Maxon
- Polystichum muricatum (L.) Fée
  (=) Polystichum moritzianum (Klotzsch) Hieron.
- Polystichum nakenense Ching
- Polystichum neolobatum Nakai
  (=) Polystichum assurgens Ching & S.K. Wu
  (=) Polystichum yigongense Ching & S.K. Wu
- Polystichum nepalense (Spreng.) C.Chr.
  (=) Polystichum atroviridissimum Hayata
- Polystichum ningshenense Ching & Y.P.Hsu
- Polystichum obliquum (D.Don.) T.Moore
- Polystichum omeiense C.Chr.
  (=) Polystichum carvifolium (Baker) Diels
- Polystichum ordinatum (Kunze) Liebm.
  (=) Polystichum bicolor A.R.Sm.
- Polystichum orientalitibeticum Ching
- Polystichum paramoupinense Ching
- Polystichum parvipinnulum Tagawa
- Polystichum piceopaleaceum Tagawa
- Polystichum polyblepharum (Roem. ex Kunze) C.Presl – Tassel fern
  (=) Polystichum aculeatum var. japonicum (Franch. & Sav.) Diels
  (=) Polystichum setosum (Wall.) Schott
- Polystichum prescottianum (Wall. ex Mett.) T. Moore
  (=) Polystichum erinaceum Ching & S.K.Wu
- Polystichum prionolepis Hayata
  (=) Polystichum rectipinnum Hayata
- Polystichum proliferum – Mother shield fern
- Polystichum pseudocastaneum Ching & S.K.Wu
  (=) Polystichum brunneum Ching & S.K.Wu
- Polystichum pseudomakinoi Tagawa
- Polystichum punctiferum C.Chr.
  (=) Polystichum glingense Ching & Y.X.Ling
  (=) Polystichum virescens Ching & S.K.Wu
- Polystichum pungens (Kaulf.) C.Presl – Forest shield fern
  (=) Polystichum lucidum (Burm.f.) Bech.
- Polystichum qamdoense Ching & S.K.Wu
  (=) Polystichum tumbatzense Ching & S.K.Wu
- Polystichum retrosopaleaceum (Kodama) Tagawa
  (=) Polystichum aculeatum var. retrosopaleaceum Kodama
- Polystichum rhombiforme Ching & S.K.Wu
- Polystichum rhomboidea (Schott) Ching
  (=) Polystichum rhomboideum Schott
- Polystichum richardii (Hook.) J.Sm. – Common shield fern
- Polystichum rigens Tagawa
  (=) Polystichum platychlamys Ching
- Polystichum rotundilobum Ching
- Polystichum scopulinum (D.C. Eaton) Maxon – Mountain holly fern, rock sword fern
  (=) Polystichum mohrioides var. scopulinum (D.C. Eaton) Fernald
- Polystichum semifertile (C.B. Clarke) Ching
  (=) Polystichum nyalamense Ching
- Polystichum setiferum (Forssk.) Moore ex Woyn. – Soft shield fern
  (=) Polystichum angulare (Willd.) C. Presl
- Polystichum setigerum (C. Presl) C. Presl – Alaska hollyfern
- Polystichum shensiense H. Christ
  (=) Polystichum lichiangense (C.H. Wright) Ching ex H.S. Kung
- Polystichum silvaticum (Colenso) Diels
- Polystichum simplicipinnum Hayata
- Polystichum sinense (H.Christ) H.Christ
  (=) Polystichum atuntzeense Ching
  (=) Polystichum austrotibeticum Ching & S.K.Wu
  (=) Polystichum decorum Ching & S.K.Wu
  (=) Polystichum ellipticum Ching & S.K.Wu
  (=) Polystichum fukuyamae Tagawa
  (=) Polystichum lhasaense Ching
  (=) Polystichum parasinense Cheng-yuan Yang
  (=) Polystichum wilsoni H.Christ
- Polystichum squarrosum (D.Don) Fée
  (=) Polystichum apicisterile Ching & S.K.Wu
  (=) Polystichum integripinnulum Ching
- Polystichum stenophyllum H.Christ
  var. conaense (=) Polystichum conaense Ching & S.K.Wu
- Polystichum stimulans (Kunze ex Mett.) Bedd.
  (=) Polystichum ilicifolium (D. Don) T. Moore
- Polystichum submite (H. Christ) Diels
  (=) Polystichum paradoxum Ching & Y.P.Hsu
- Polystichum tacticopterum (Kunze) T. Moore
  (=) Polystichum heteropaleaceum N.C. Nair & Nag
  (=) Polystichum kodamae Tagawa
- Polystichum thomsoni (Hook.f.) Bedd.
- Polystichum tibeticum Ching
- Polystichum transvaalense N.C.Anthony – Stemmed shield fern
- Polystichum tripteron (Kunze) C.Presl
- Polystichum tsus-simense (Hook.) J.Sm. – Korean rock fern
  (=) Polystichum falcilobum Ching
- Polystichum vestitum (G.Forst.) C.Presl – Prickly shield fern
- Polystichum wattii (Bedd.) C.Chr.
- Polystichum whiteleggei Watts
- Polystichum xiphophyllum (Baker) Diels
  (=) Polystichum monotis (H.Christ) C.Chr.
  (=) Polystichum praelongum H.Christ
- Polystichum yadongense Ching & S.K.Wu
- Polystichum yunnanense H.Christ
  (=) Polystichum gyirongense Ching
  (=) Polystichum jizhushanense Ching

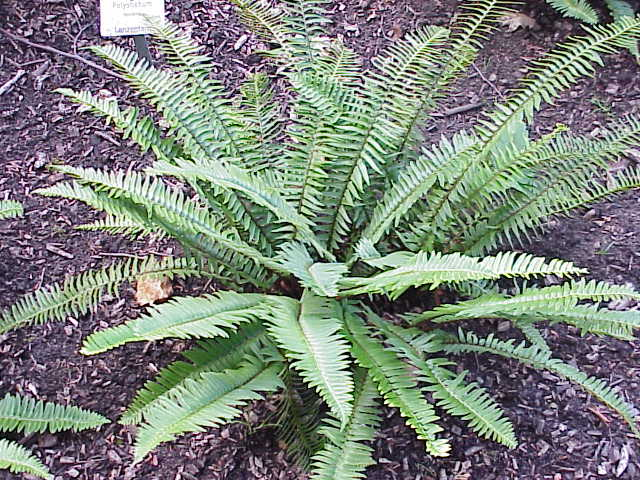
Polystichum munitum

=== Hybrids ===
Hybridisation is frequent in the genus, with several named hybrids, including:-

- P. × bicknellii (P. aculeatum × P. setiferum)
- P. × illyricum (P. aculeatum × P. lonchitis)
- P. × lonchitiforme (P. lonchitis × P. setiferum)
- P. × lesliei (P. setiferum × P. munitum) first found in Surrey in 1995 and a second plant found in Cornwall in 2001.
- P. × potteri (P. braunii × P. acrostichoides)

=== Former species ===
Species that were at one time considered part of the genus Polystichum, but are now categorized elsewhere, include:

- Polystichum auriculatum (L.) C.Presl 1836 = Dryopteris auriculata (L.) Kuntze 1891
- Polystichum falcatum (L.f.) Diels 1899 = Cyrtomium falcatum (L.f.) C.Presl – Japanese Holly Fern
- Polystichum lepidocaulon (Hook.) J.Sm. 1866 = Cyrtomidictyum lepidocaulon (Hook.) Ching 1940

== Distribution ==
With species in six continents and many islands, Polystichum is remarkable for its global spread. Polystichum ferns first emerged in Asia during the late Eocene, around 49 million years ago. During this period there were high temperatures across the globe, which may have contributed to the diversification of flora.

Polystichum's spread to the New World took place during the late Eocene to early Oligocene. The most likely dispersal method was across a paratropical forest on a Pacific Ocean land bridge, such as the Bering Land Bridge. For a period before the height of the Ice Age temperatures froze enough seawater to lower the sea level but still allowed a forest to grow in Northern latitudes. From there Polystichum was able to spread through North American and into Central America.

Original theories described Polystichum spreading further into South America from Central America, but recent research has shown that South American Polystichum instead spread through long-distance dispersal from Australia. Genetic study has revealed close evolutionary relationships between Polystichum species in these two areas. Both Austral and Austral South American species lack and indusium. Austral Polystichum lack cilia, while South American species have marginal cilia.

Hawaiian Polystichum also spread through long-distance dispersal, with two separate dispersal events leading to the three Polystichum now observed in Hawaii.

== Ecology ==
Polystichum species are used as food plants by the larvae of some Lepidoptera species including Pharmacis fusconebulosa. Specimens of some of these can be found at the Royal Botanic Gardens, Sydney.

== Cultivation ==
Several species are grown as ornamental plants in gardens, notably P. setiferum. One species, P. tsus-simense of eastern Asia, is commonly offered as a houseplant.
