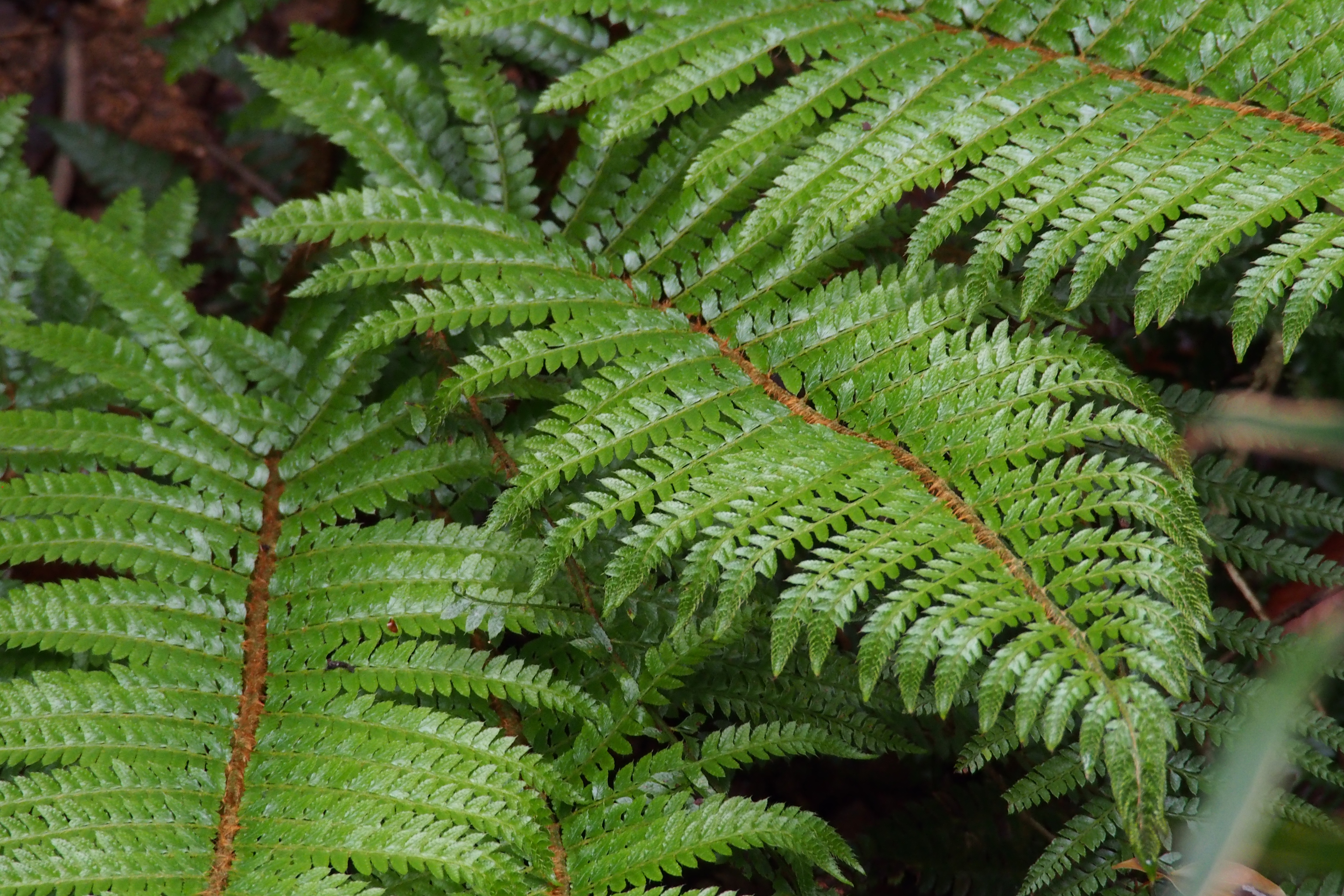
- Polystichum polyblepharum near Kobe, Japan

Scientific classification
- Kingdom: Plantae
- Clade: Tracheophytes
- Division: Polypodiophyta
- Class: Polypodiopsida
- Order: Polypodiales
- Suborder: Polypodiineae
- Family: Dryopteridaceae
- Genus: Polystichum
- Species: P. polyblepharum

Binomial name
- Polystichum polyblepharum (Roem. ex Kunze) C. Presl

Synonyms
- Aspidium aculeatum var. japonicum Franch. & Sav.; Aspidium polyblepharum Roem. ex Kunze; Polystichum aculeatum var. japonicum (Franch. & Sav.) Diels

= Polystichum polyblepharum =

Species of fern

Polystichum polyblepharum, the Japanese lace fern or tassel fern, is a species of plant in the wood fern family Dryopteridaceae, native to Japan and South Korea. Growing to 1 m (3.3 ft) tall and broad, it forms clumps ("shuttlecocks") of evergreen fronds.

The Latin specific epithet polyblepharum means "many eyelashes". and refers to bristles on the stipe and rachis (parts of the stem).

It is grown in temperate regions as an ornamental subject, enjoying damp, well-drained soil in shade or dappled shade. It has been given the Royal Horticultural Society's Award of Garden Merit.
