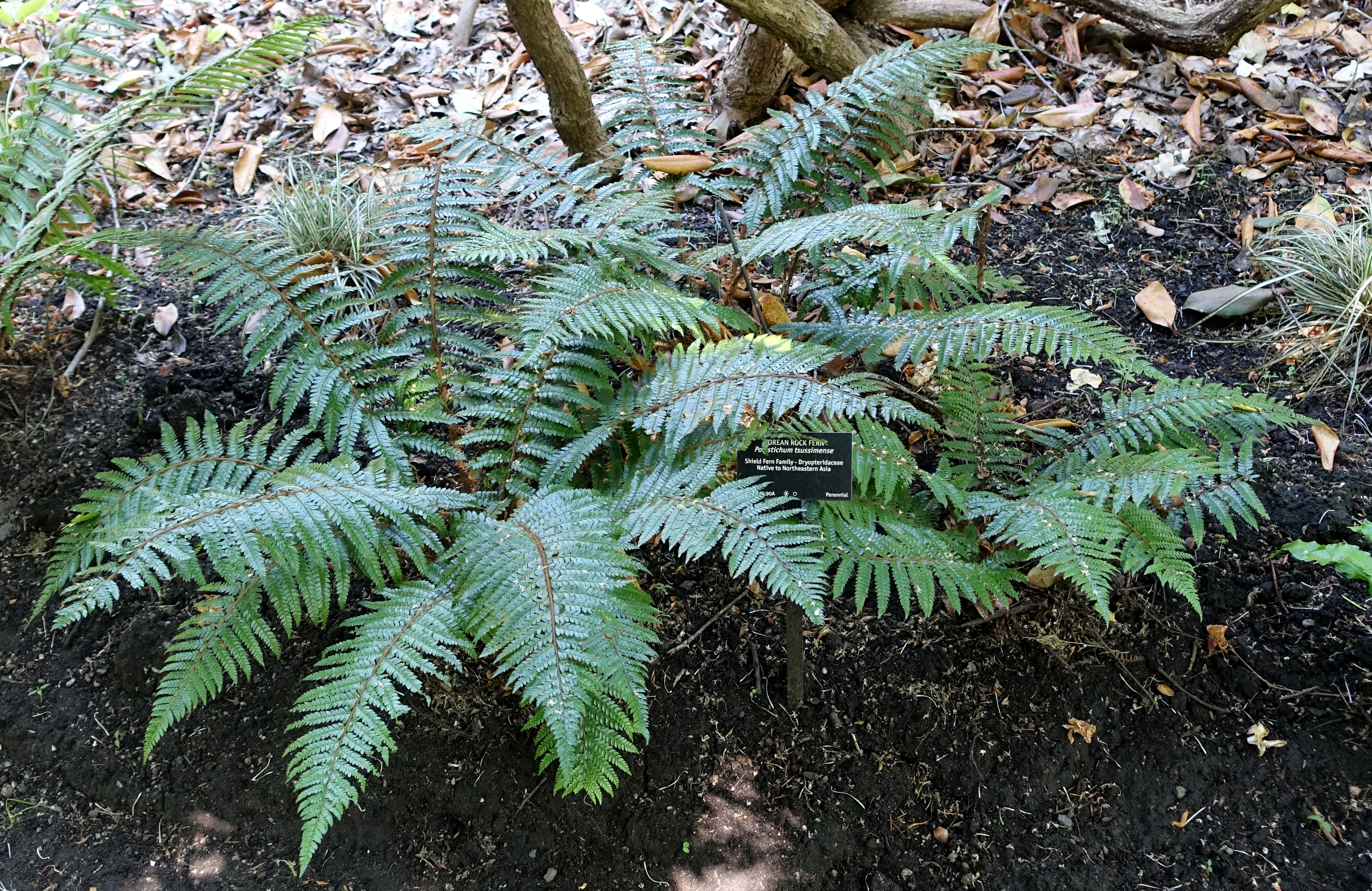

Scientific classification
- Kingdom: Plantae
- Clade: Tracheophytes
- Division: Polypodiophyta
- Class: Polypodiopsida
- Order: Polypodiales
- Suborder: Polypodiineae
- Family: Dryopteridaceae
- Genus: Polystichum
- Species: P. luctuosum

Binomial name
- Polystichum luctuosum (Kunze) T. Moore

= Polystichum luctuosum =

Species of fern

Polystichum luctuosum is a species of fern known by the common names Korean rock fern and Tsushima holly fern. It is a small, clump-forming, tufted, evergreen to semi-evergreen fern native to Japan, Korea, Taiwan, China, Vietnam, and Thailand, as well as southern Africa. The fern grows to about 1–1.5 feet in height, with a spread of 1–1.5 feet, with stipe up to 30 cm long, pale to mid-brown, with dark brown to almost black scales, and bi-pinnate, glossy, dark green fronds.

== Synonyms ==
- Aspidium aculeatum var. pallescens Franch.
- Aspidium luctuosum Kunze
- Aspidium tsus-simense Hook.
- Polystichum falcilobum Ching
- Polystichum tsus-simense (Hook.) J. Sm.
- Polystichum tsus-simense var. pallescens Franch.
