= Polystichum moorei =

Conservation status
- Endangered (EPBC Act)

Scientific classification
- Kingdom: Plantae
- Clade: Tracheophytes
- Division: Polypodiophyta
- Class: Polypodiopsida
- Order: Polypodiales
- Suborder: Polypodiineae
- Family: Dryopteridaceae
- Genus: Polystichum
- Species: P. moorei

Binomial name
- Polystichum moorei Christ

Species of fern

Polystichum moorei is a fern in the family Dryopteridaceae. The specific epithet honours Charles Moore, Director of the Royal Botanic Gardens, Sydney, from 1848 to 1896, who collected plants on Lord Howe Island in 1869.

== Description ==
The plant is a terrestrial or lithophytic fern. It has a short rhizome with dense, brown, lanceolate scales. Its fronds combine a 2–12 cm stipe with a lamina 10–25 cm long, 7–14 cm wide.

== Distribution and habitat ==
The fern is endemic to Australia’s subtropical Lord Howe Island in the Tasman Sea; it occupies rocky habitats around the bases of Mounts Lidgbird and Gower.
