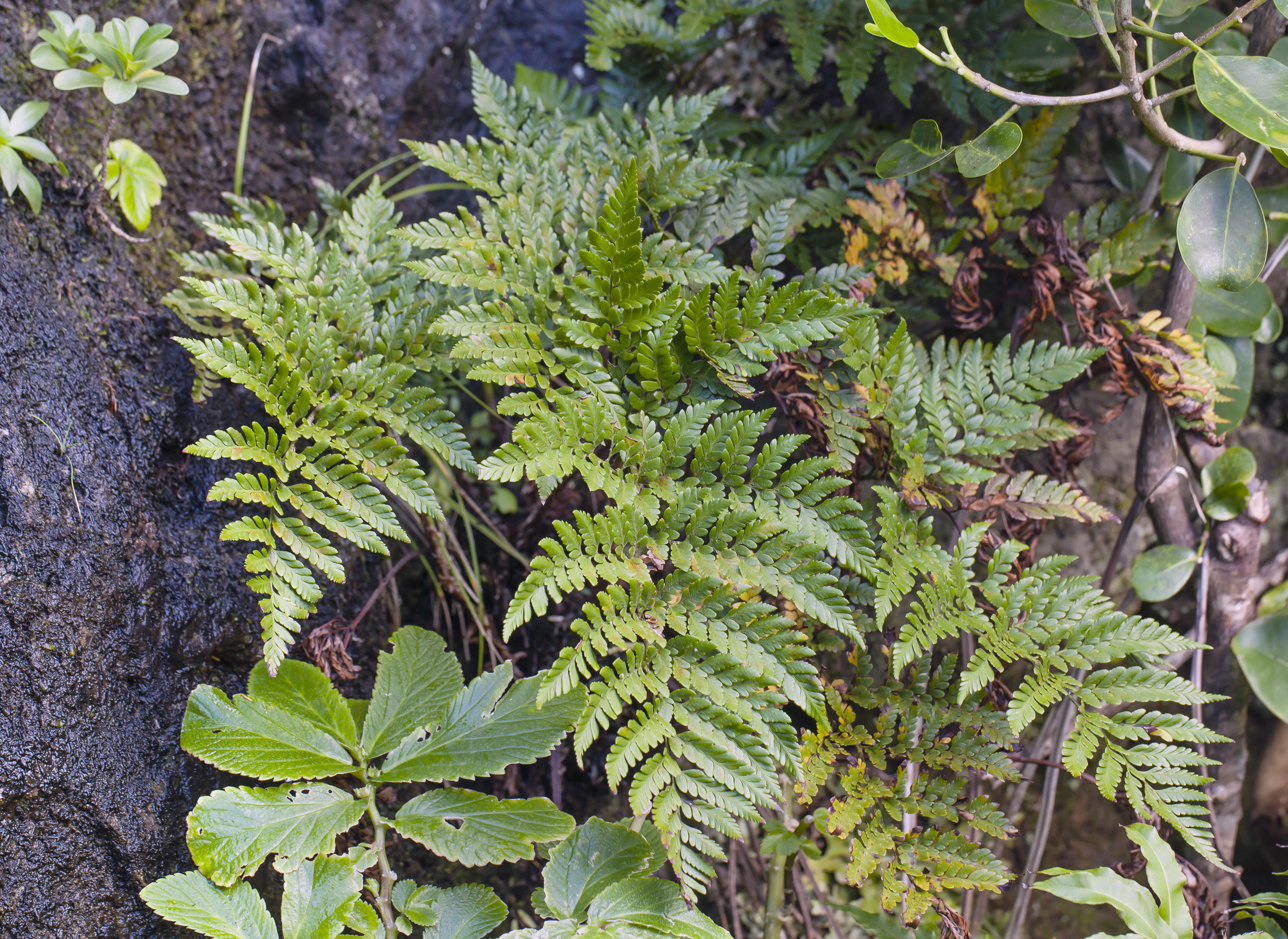

Scientific classification
- Kingdom: Plantae
- Clade: Tracheophytes
- Division: Polypodiophyta
- Class: Polypodiopsida
- Order: Polypodiales
- Suborder: Polypodiineae
- Family: Dryopteridaceae
- Genus: Polystichum
- Species: P. whiteleggei

Binomial name
- Polystichum whiteleggei Watts

= Polystichum whiteleggei =

Species of fern

Polystichum whiteleggei is a fern in the family Dryopteridaceae. A former common name was heavy fern, alluding to the weight of one of the large, thick textured, fronds when fully developed. The specific epithet honours Thomas Whitelegge (1850–1927) of the Australian Museum, who collected zoological specimens on Lord Howe Island in 1887, who first noticed the fern's distinctiveness.

== Description ==
The plant is a terrestrial or lithophytic fern. It has a short creeping rhizome with dense, dark brown, lanceolate scales. Its 3-pinnate fronds combine a 10–50 cm stipe with a lamina 15–50 cm long and 12–40 cm wide.

== Distribution and habitat ==
The fern is endemic to Australia’s subtropical Lord Howe Island in the Tasman Sea; it is locally common to rare on the edges and flanks of the summits of Mounts Lidgbird and Gower.
