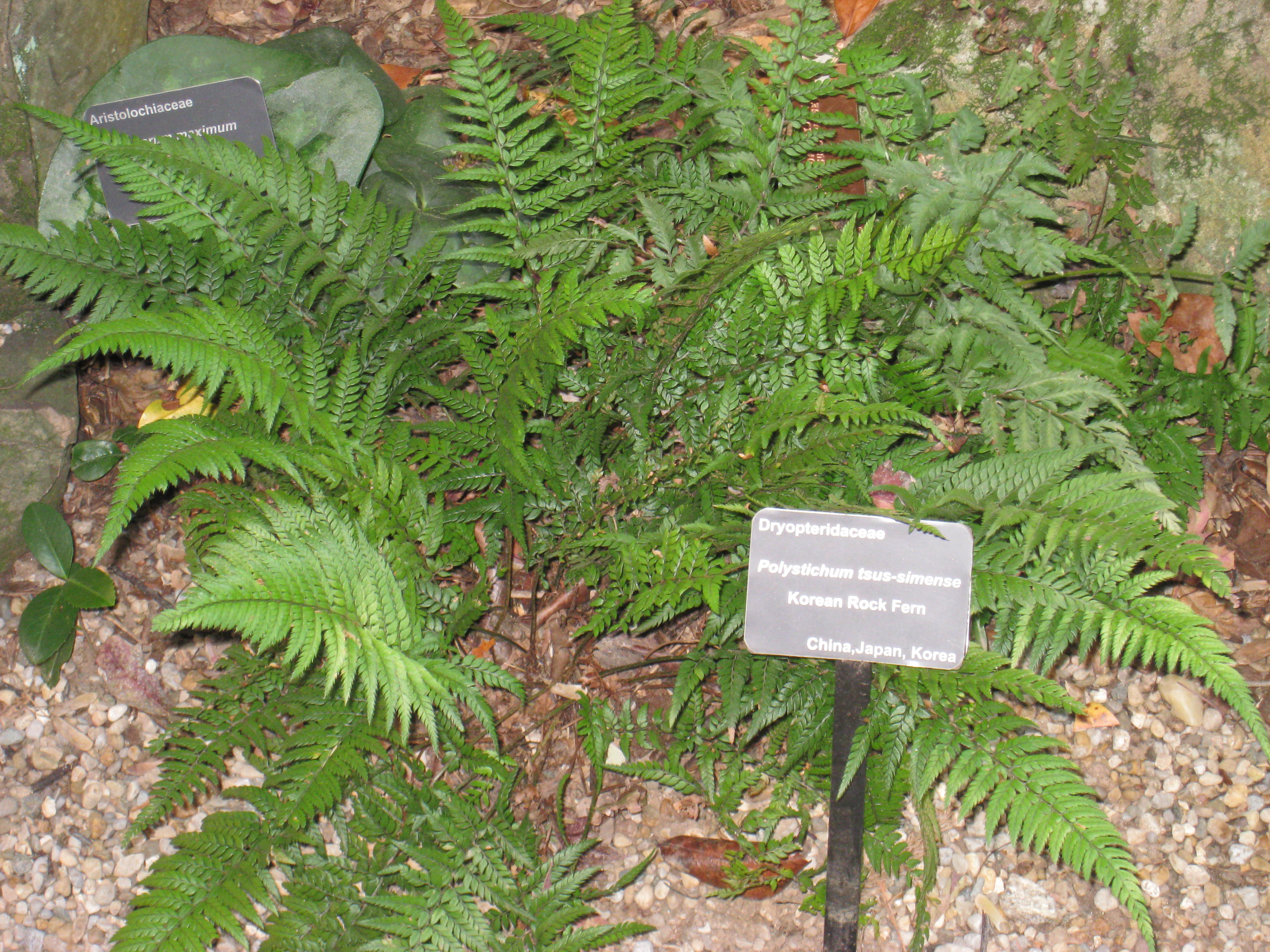

Scientific classification
- Kingdom: Plantae
- Clade: Tracheophytes
- Division: Polypodiophyta
- Class: Polypodiopsida
- Order: Polypodiales
- Suborder: Polypodiineae
- Family: Dryopteridaceae
- Genus: Polystichum
- Species: P. tsus-simense

Binomial name
- Polystichum tsus-simense (Hook.) J.Sm.

= Polystichum tsus-simense =

Species of fern

Polystichum tsus-simense, commonly known as the Korean rock fern, is a perennial herbaceous plant native to East Asia. Its common name corresponds with its ability to grow in shady areas of rock walls. This fern species is a familiar ornamental plant grown in home gardens.

== Distribution ==
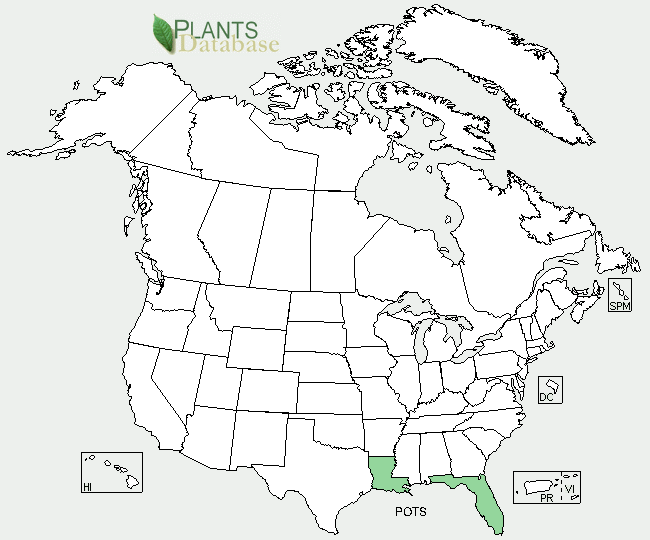

The geographic origin of P. tsus-simense is the East Asian countries, such as China, Korea, Japan, Thailand, and the Indochina region. The specific epithet tsus-simense (often written as tsussimense) refers to Tsushima Island. Although it is not native to the United States, the Korean rock fern has been introduced to the country through Florida and Louisiana.

== Habitat and Ecology ==
Polystichum tsus-simense flourishes in shady areas with partial to no sun exposure in fertile and well-drained soil with high moisture. It can grow in acid, alkaline, and neutral soil, in part shade or full sun. It inhabits slopes and rocky places of forests and shores of streams. It can also grow in indoor pots and in shady areas of a garden. It has a clump-forming habit with many basal shoots forming open groups or clusters.

== Morphology ==
Individuals of P. tsus-simense are herbaceous with no persistent woody stem above ground. A mature plant can range from 20 to 50 cm tall and approximately 40 cm wide with evergreen foliage. As vascular land plants, they contain four or more bundles in an arc. They have dark green bipinnate fronds, which include crenate blades with pinnate venation within the pinnately arranged fronds. Black veins run through the glossy lanceolate blades. The grooved stipe of the plant is blackish brown with rhizome-like scales at the base. The rhizome is short and erect with broadly lanceolate scales. It is brown in color with blackish central portions.

== Reproduction ==
Polystichum tsus-simense uses spores to propagate. As an early vascular plant, a fern is not able to reproduce through seeds. Wind plays a major role in the dispersal mechanism of the spores. The Korean rock ferns sow their spores in the summer, and divide in the spring. The sporangia, dark brown vessels, contain spores, and are grouped into round clusters called sori. The sori are aligned in a row between the margin and the midrib, and are covered with a peltate indusium.

== Usage ==
Polystichum tsus-simense is mainly used as an ornamental plant, for both indoors and outdoors. It has gained the Royal Horticultural Society's Award of Garden Merit.

With little sunlight required, it is a suitable candidate for a potted plant indoors, on a deck, or the porch. The contrast of the dark stems with the green fronds makes this an attractive adornment in homes. The plant's ability to stay green throughout the year contributes to its value to a gardener. It is also commonly offered as a house gift in certain Asian cultures.
