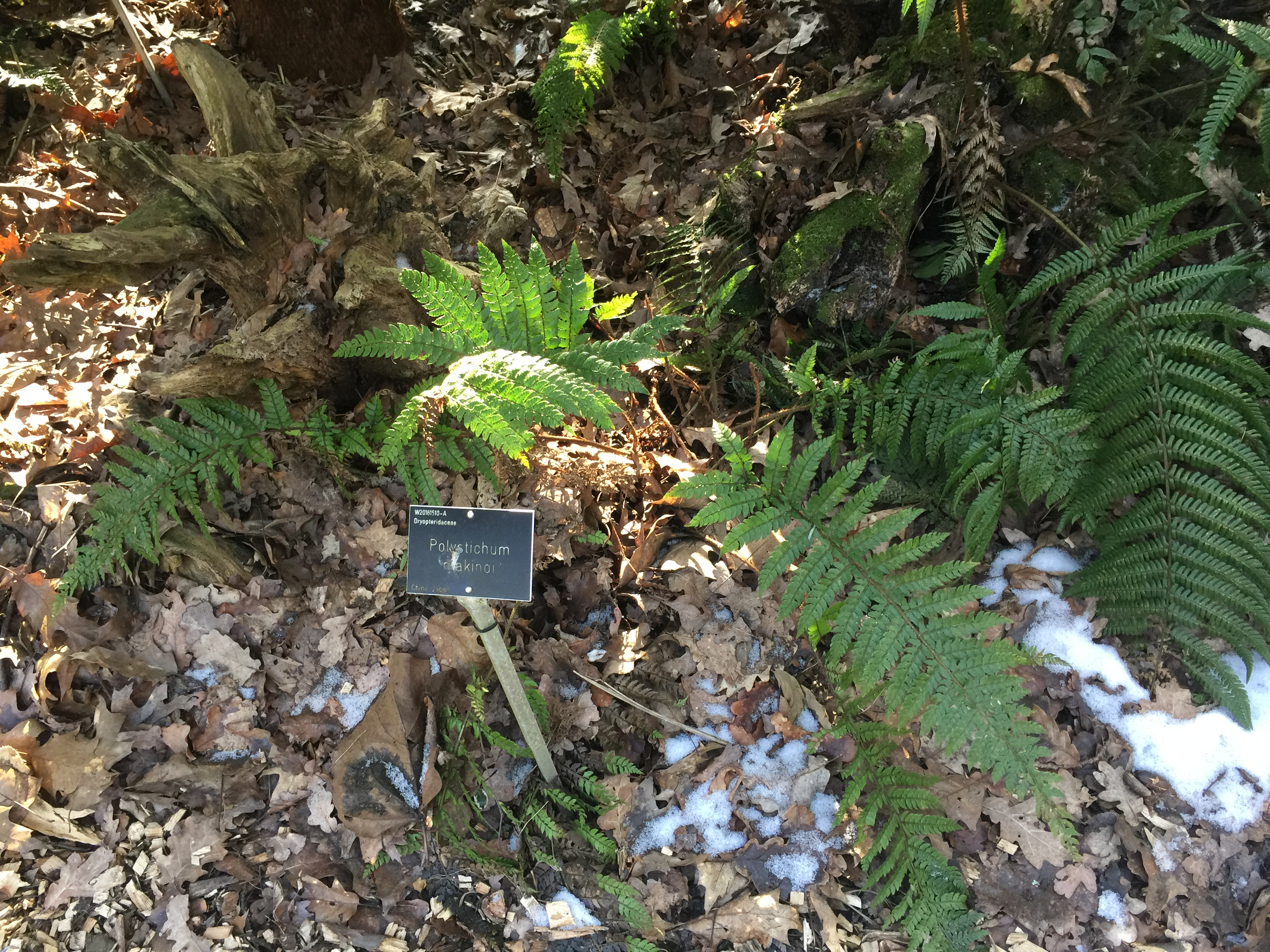

Scientific classification
- Kingdom: Plantae
- Clade: Tracheophytes
- Division: Polypodiophyta
- Class: Polypodiopsida
- Order: Polypodiales
- Suborder: Polypodiineae
- Family: Dryopteridaceae
- Genus: Polystichum
- Species: P. makinoi

Binomial name
- Polystichum makinoi Tagawa

= Polystichum makinoi =

Species of fern

Polystichum makinoi is a species of fern in the genus Polystichum in the family Dryopteridaceae.

== Distribution ==
P. makinoi is native to Bhutan, China, India, Japan, Nepal, Tibet, North Korea, South Korea, and Myanmar.

== Description ==
Polystichum makinoi is an evergreen fern with triangular, glossy green leaves. It can reach up to 60 centimeters in height at maturity.

== Etymology ==
Polystichum is derived from Greek and means 'many rows', which is a reference to the arrangement of the sori of ferns in this genus.

Makinoi is named for Tomitaro Makino (1863-1957), a Japanese botanist who was known as 'the father of Japanese botany'.
