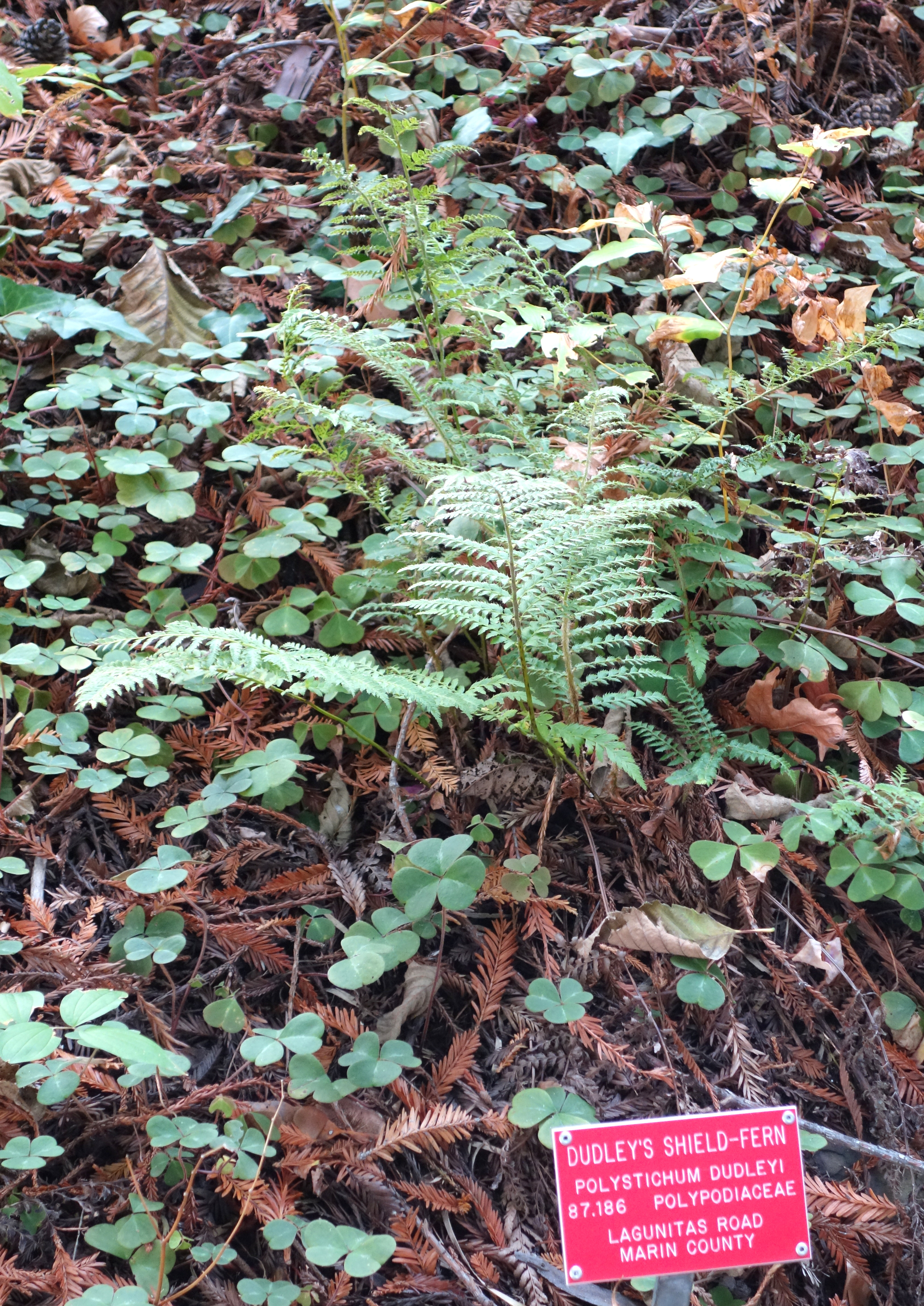

Conservation status
- Imperiled (NatureServe)

Scientific classification
- Kingdom: Plantae
- Clade: Tracheophytes
- Division: Polypodiophyta
- Class: Polypodiopsida
- Order: Polypodiales
- Suborder: Polypodiineae
- Family: Dryopteridaceae
- Genus: Polystichum
- Species: P. dudleyi

Binomial name
- Polystichum dudleyi Maxon

= Polystichum dudleyi =

Species of fern

Polystichum dudleyi is a species of fern known by the common name Dudley's sword fern. It is endemic to California, where it is known from the forests of the central and southern California Coast Ranges.

== Description ==
The Polystichum dudleyi fern produces fronds up to 40 in (1.0 m) long. Each lance-shaped leaf is made up of many lance-shaped leaflets which are deeply divided into smaller segments. It grows in moist forests.
