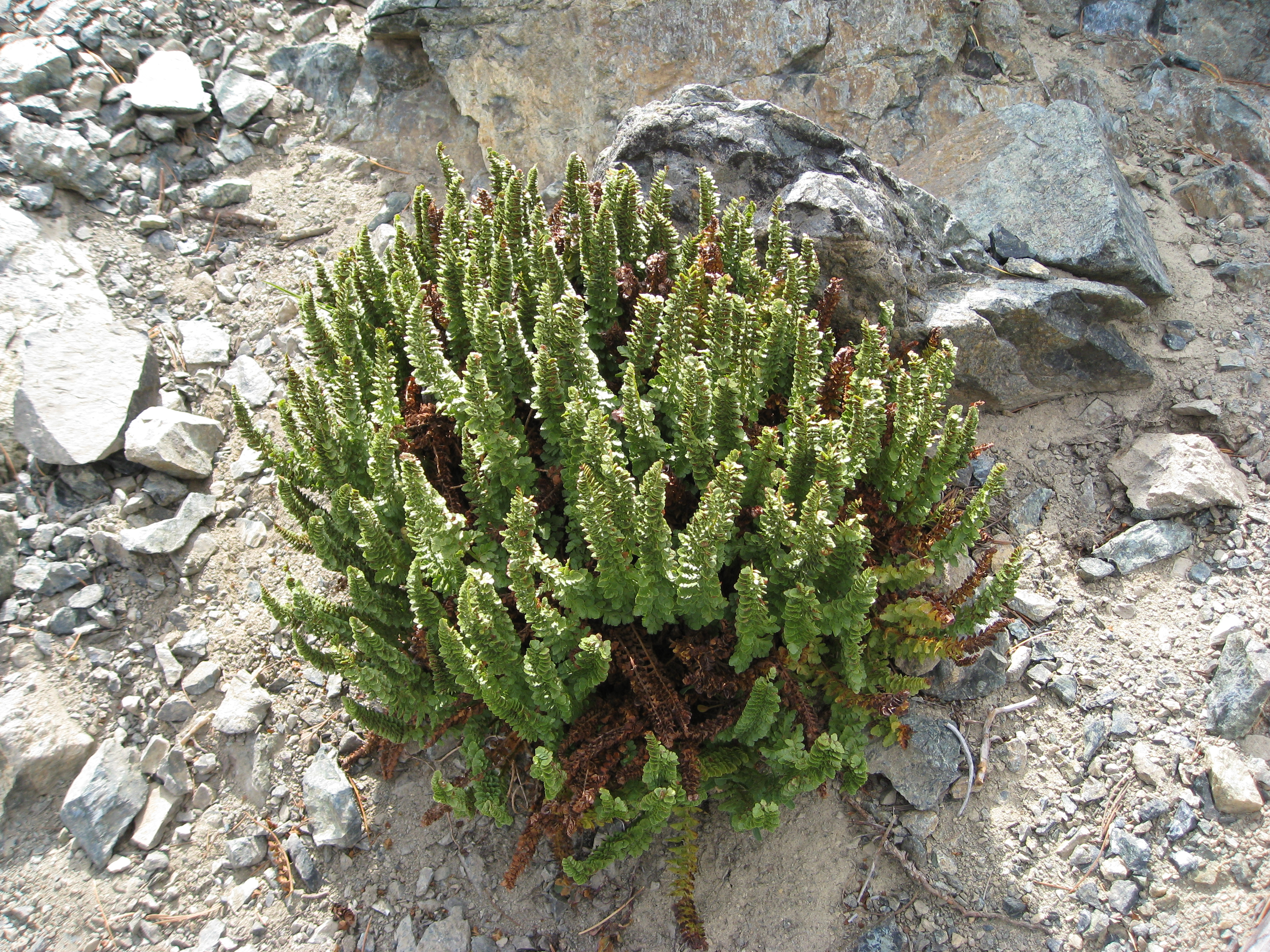

Conservation status
- Apparently Secure (NatureServe)

Scientific classification
- Kingdom: Plantae
- Clade: Tracheophytes
- Division: Polypodiophyta
- Class: Polypodiopsida
- Order: Polypodiales
- Suborder: Polypodiineae
- Family: Dryopteridaceae
- Genus: Polystichum
- Species: P. lemmonii

Binomial name
- Polystichum lemmonii Underw.

= Polystichum lemmonii =

Species of fern

Polystichum lemmonii is a species of fern known by the common names Lemmon's holly fern and Shasta fern. It is native to western North America from the Sierra Nevada of California north to Washington. It is also known from British Columbia, where there is an occurrence in the mountains above the Okanagan Valley. and another in the mountains near Harrison Lake.

== Description ==
This fern produces several narrow, erect lance-shaped leaves 10 to 35 centimeters long. Each leaf (frond) is made up of many oval leaflets (pinnae) which are overlapping, folded, and twisted such that the leaves may appear almost cylindrical in outline. Leaflet margins are entire or bluntly dentate.

== Habitat ==
P. lemmonii grows in mountainous habitat on ultramafic rock substrates, almost always in serpentine soils or among serpentine rocks. Though it grows in very restricted areas, P. lemmonii can be locally very abundant.

== Gallery ==
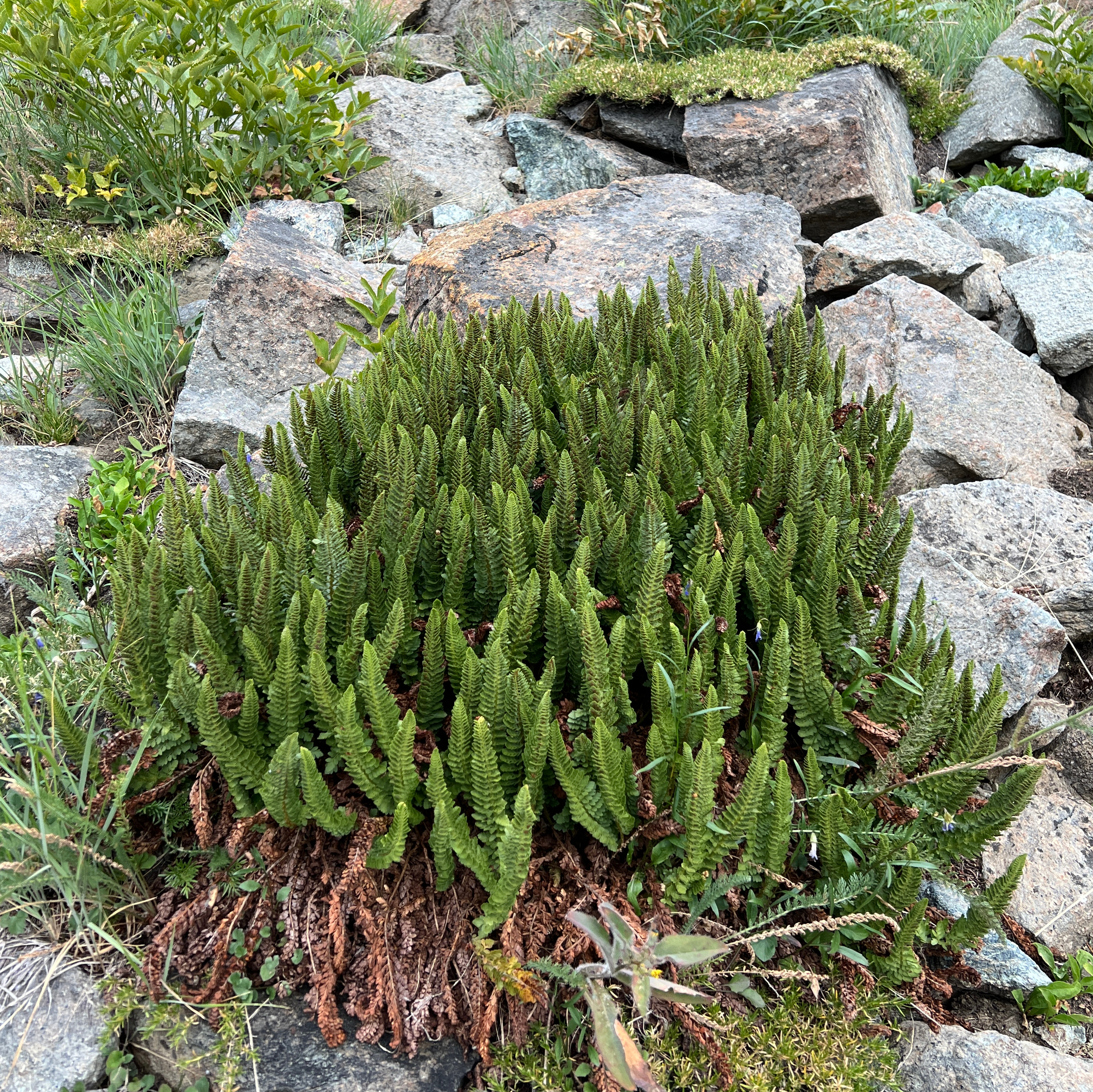
On ultramafic rock in Wenatchee Mountains

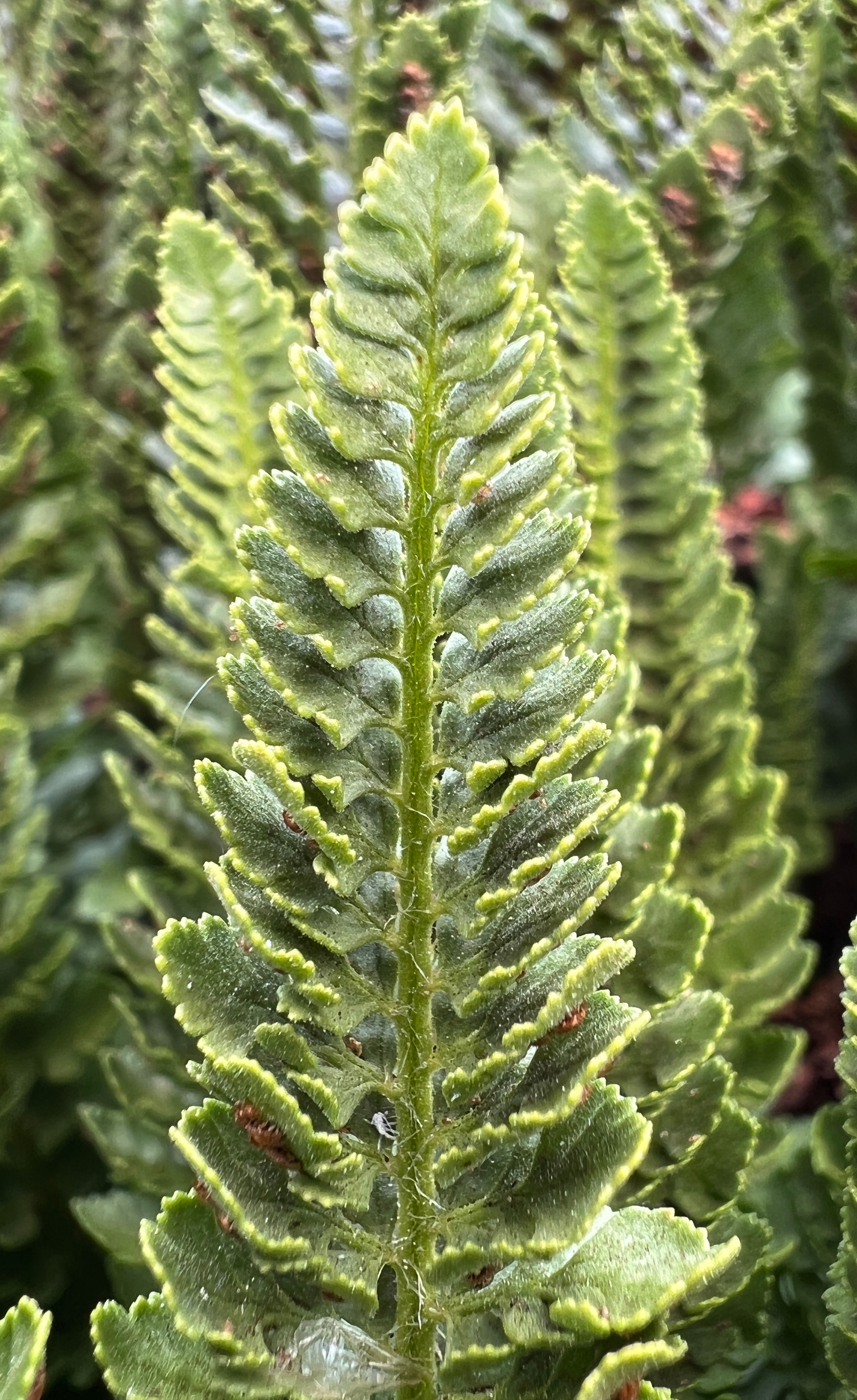
Adaxial (upper) leaf surface

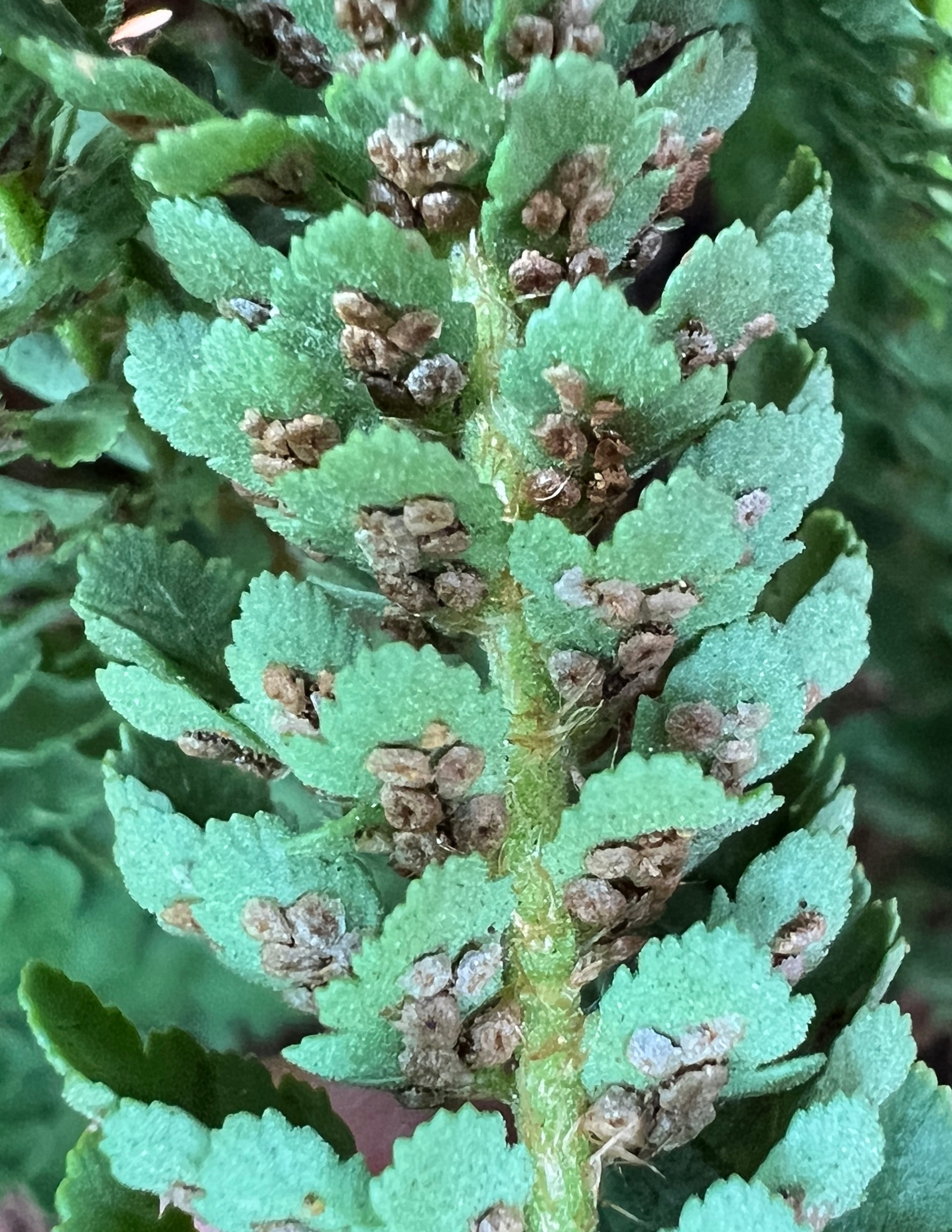
Abaxial (lower) leaf surface with sori

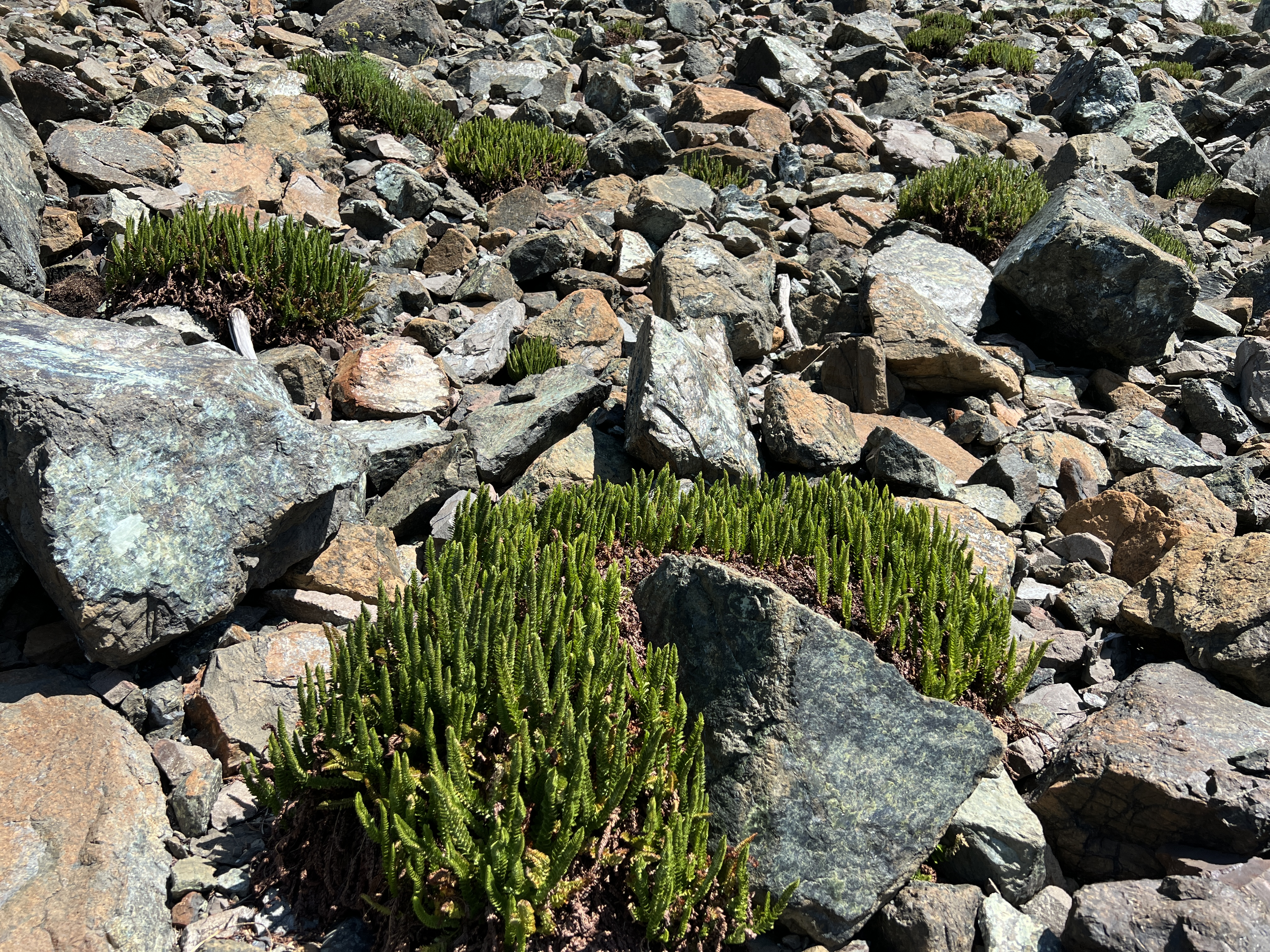
On Bean Peak in Wenatchee Mountains
