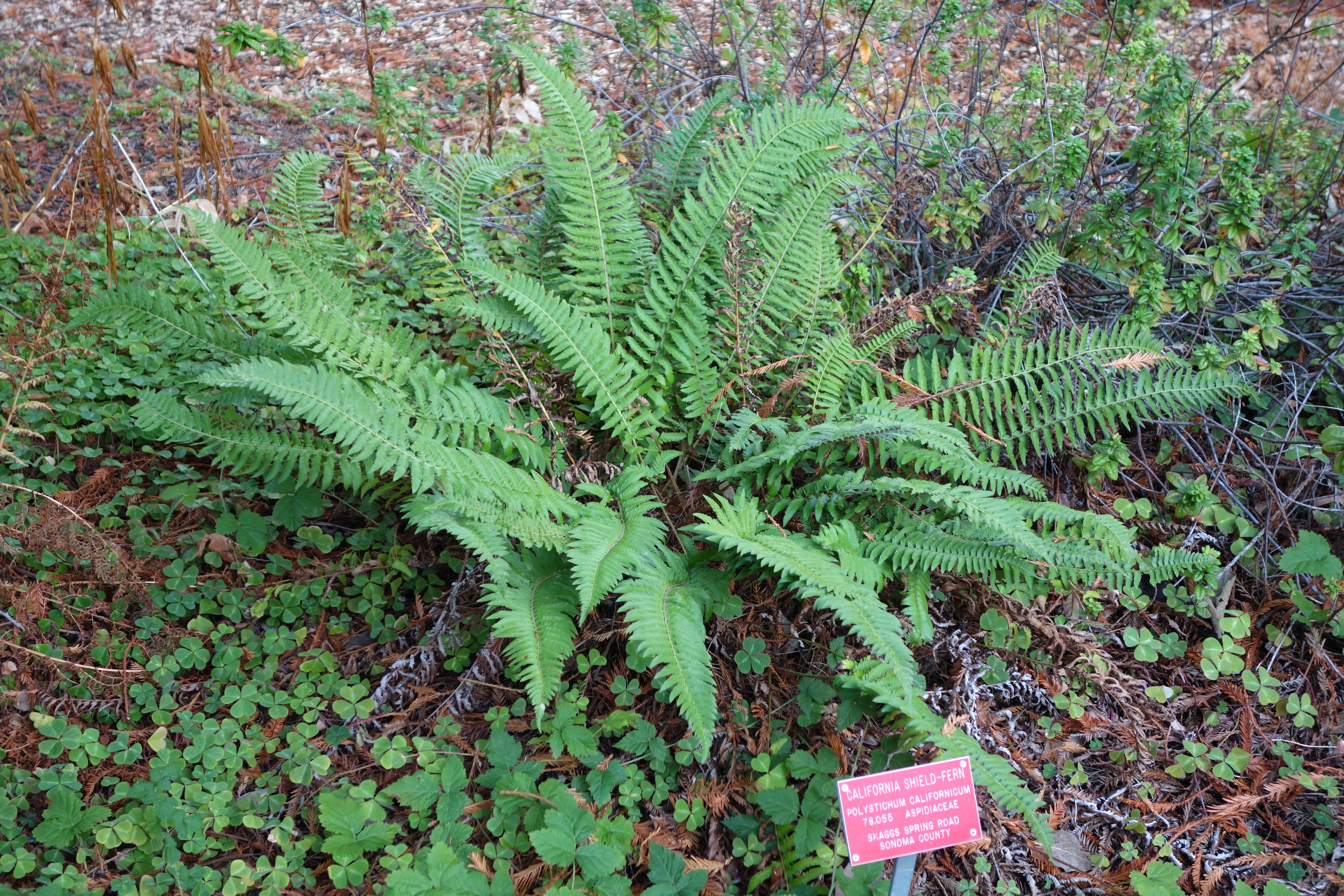

Scientific classification
- Kingdom: Plantae
- Clade: Tracheophytes
- Division: Polypodiophyta
- Class: Polypodiopsida
- Order: Polypodiales
- Suborder: Polypodiineae
- Family: Dryopteridaceae
- Genus: Polystichum
- Species: P. californicum

Binomial name
- Polystichum californicum (D.C.Eaton) Diels

= Polystichum californicum =

Species of fern

Polystichum californicum is a species of fern known by the common name California sword fern. It is native to western North America from British Columbia to California, where it occurs in the coastal mountain ranges and the Cascade Range through the Sierra Nevada. Its habitat includes forest understory and open rocky slopes. This fern produces several arching or erect leaves up to a meter long. Each lance-shaped leaf is made up of many sharp-toothed segments. The undersides bear rounded sori which contain the spores. This fern arose as a hybrid between other Polystichum species and readily forms hybrids of its own.
