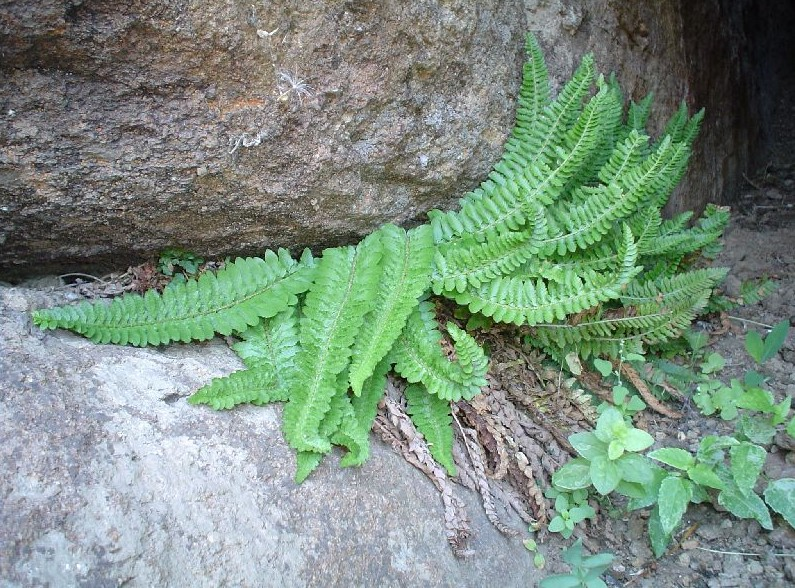

Conservation status
- Apparently Secure (NatureServe)

Scientific classification
- Kingdom: Plantae
- Clade: Tracheophytes
- Division: Polypodiophyta
- Class: Polypodiopsida
- Order: Polypodiales
- Suborder: Polypodiineae
- Family: Dryopteridaceae
- Genus: Polystichum
- Species: P. scopulinum

Binomial name
- Polystichum scopulinum (D.C.Eaton) Maxon

= Polystichum scopulinum =

Species of fern

Polystichum scopulinum is a species of fern known by the common names mountain hollyfern and rock sword fern. It is native to much of western North America, and it is known from disjunct occurrences in eastern Canada as well. It grows in rocky habitat, often in full sun. It is widespread but mostly found in small populations, and is noted to be most abundant on serpentine soils. This fern produces several erect, narrowly lance-shaped leaves up to 50 centimeters in length. The leaves narrow near the bases. Each leaf is divided into many lance-shaped or oblong leaflets up to 3 centimeters long. The toothed leaflets are sometimes twisted on their axes and overlapping.

P. scopulinum is probably a fertile allotetraploid with Polystichum munitum as one parent.
