= Polystichum kruckebergii =

Scientific classification
- Kingdom: Plantae
- Clade: Tracheophytes
- Division: Polypodiophyta
- Class: Polypodiopsida
- Order: Polypodiales
- Suborder: Polypodiineae
- Family: Dryopteridaceae
- Genus: Polystichum
- Species: P. kruckebergii

Binomial name
- Polystichum kruckebergii W.H.Wagner

Species of fern

Polystichum kruckebergii is a species of fern known by the common names Kruckeberg's sword fern and Kruckeberg's hollyfern. It is native to western North America from Alaska to Utah to California, where it grows in rocky mountain habitat in subalpine and alpine climates.

This fern produces several narrow, erect leaves 10 to 25 centimeters long. Each leaf is made up of many oval to triangular leaflets, each no more than about 1.5 centimeters long. The leaflets overlap and are somewhat twisted in their axes. Their edges are cut or toothed, the teeth sometimes tipped with spines.
