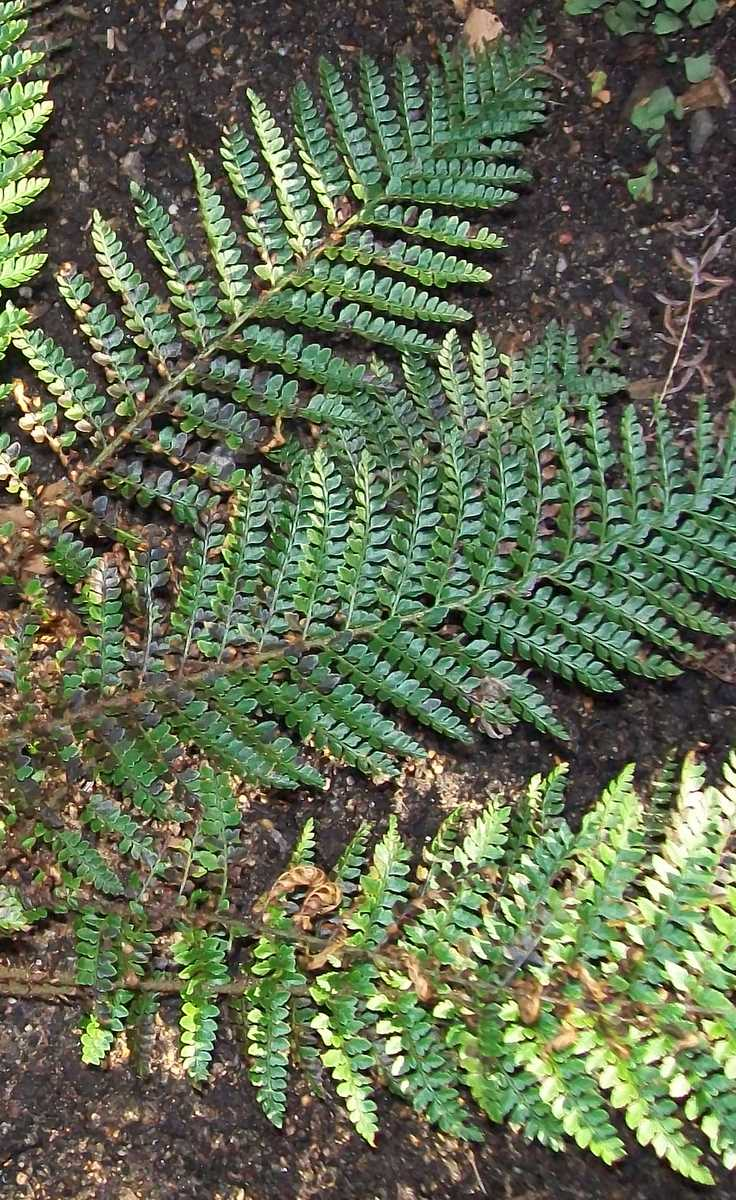
- Mother shield fern from Barrington Tops National Park, Australia

Scientific classification
- Kingdom: Plantae
- Clade: Tracheophytes
- Division: Polypodiophyta
- Class: Polypodiopsida
- Order: Polypodiales
- Suborder: Polypodiineae
- Family: Dryopteridaceae
- Genus: Polystichum
- Species: P. proliferum

Binomial name
- Polystichum proliferum (R.Br.) C.Presl

= Polystichum proliferum =

Mother shield fern

Species of fern

Polystichum proliferum, commonly known as mother shield fern is an Australian endemic fern. The genus name Polystichum is derived from Greek poly – many, and stichos – rows referring to the many rows of sori. The species name is derived from Latin, Proli – offspring and fer – bearing referring to the proliferous buds, a prominent feature of the species.

== Description ==
Polystichum proliferum is a terrestrial fern that can grow to 130 cm in height. The rhizome and frond bases are covered in persistent scales which are glossy brown with pale edges. Fronds can reach up to 100 cm in length and 30 cm wide, are dark green when mature but lighter and paler when young. Sori (spore clusters) occur in rows on either side of the midrib and are covered with by a large umbrella-like indusium (protective covering) hence the common name "mother shield fern".

== Habitat and distribution ==
Polystichum proliferum is widespread and abundant from sea-level to 1300m a.s.l., but predominantly occurs in the tablelands and ranges of New South Wales, Victoria, Australian Capital Territory and Tasmania. At elevation, Polystichum proliferum will occur in amongst boulders and at lower altitudes – in wet forests. The species typically favours gullies and creeks as well as the cooler/moister, southern and eastern facing aspects. Polystichum proliferum will however, occur in drier vegetation types such as coastal scrub and dry sclerophyll, due to its hardy characteristics such as the ability to tolerate salt-laden winds and poor soil quality. Polystichum proliferum is often associated with Dicksonia antarctica gullies, occurring higher up the gullies than Dicksonia antarctica and further away from the watercourse. The close association and similar appearance between the two species has often led to novice plant collectors misidentifying Polystichum proliferum as Dicksonia antarctica.

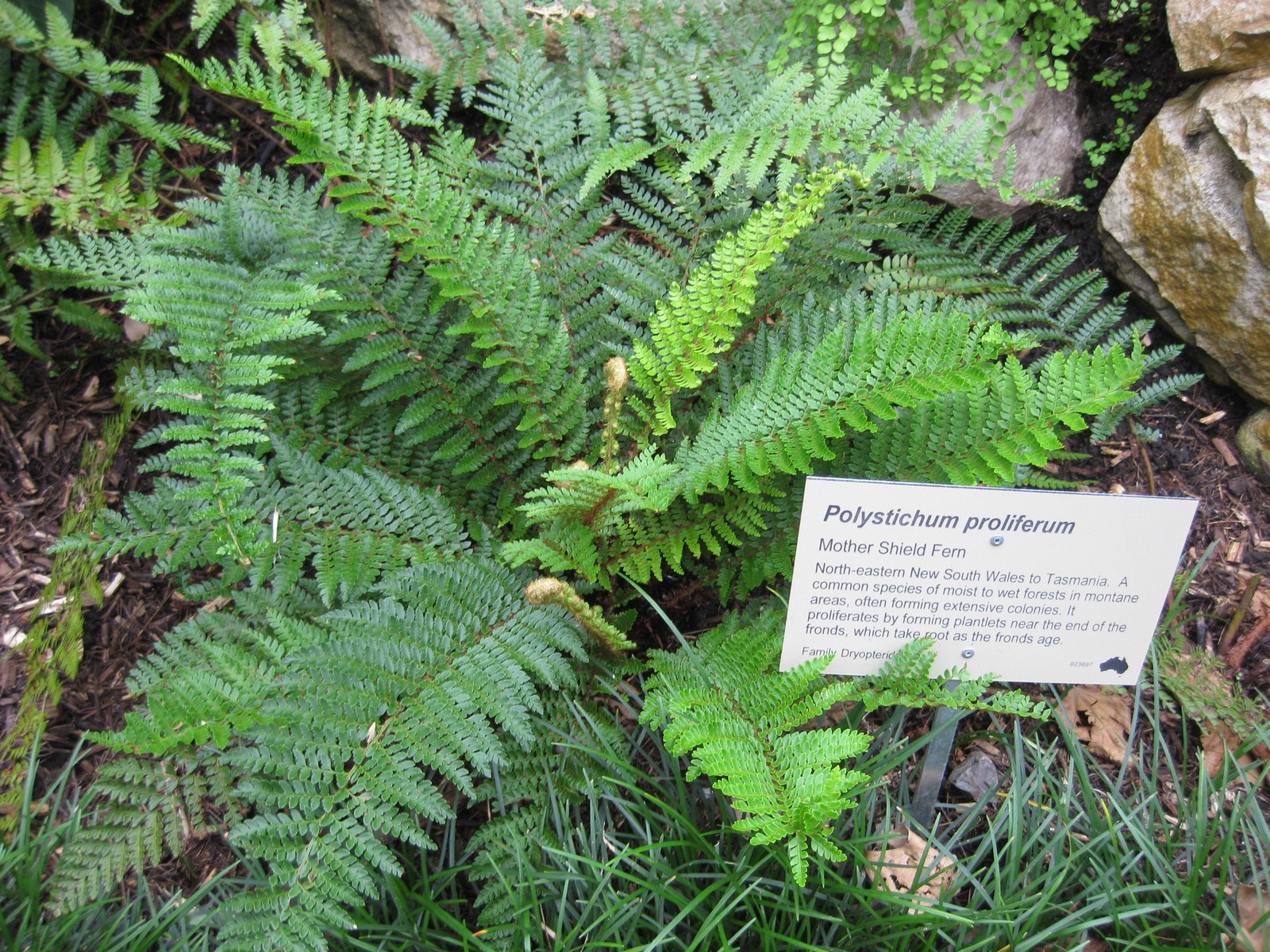
Mother Shield fern, an Australian endemic

== Reproduction ==
Polystichum proliferum will propagate vegetatively via proliferous buds or sexually through spores. Vegetative reproduction occurs when bulbils develop at end of the larger fronds grows into small plant. As the weight of the bulbil increases, the frond sags until the bulbil can take root in the soil underneath. This characteristic allows Polystichum proliferum to colonise large areas vegetatively, often becoming the dominant ground cover after a disturbance and is a desirable trait for those who cultivate the species in home gardens.

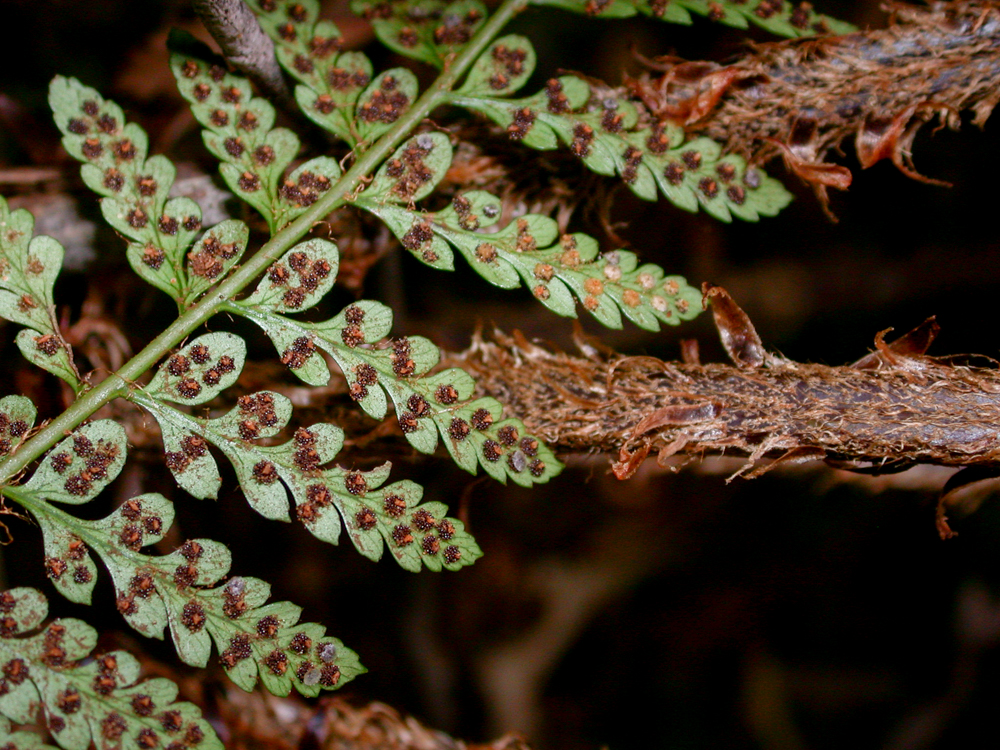
The rows of sori on the underside of a larger frond
