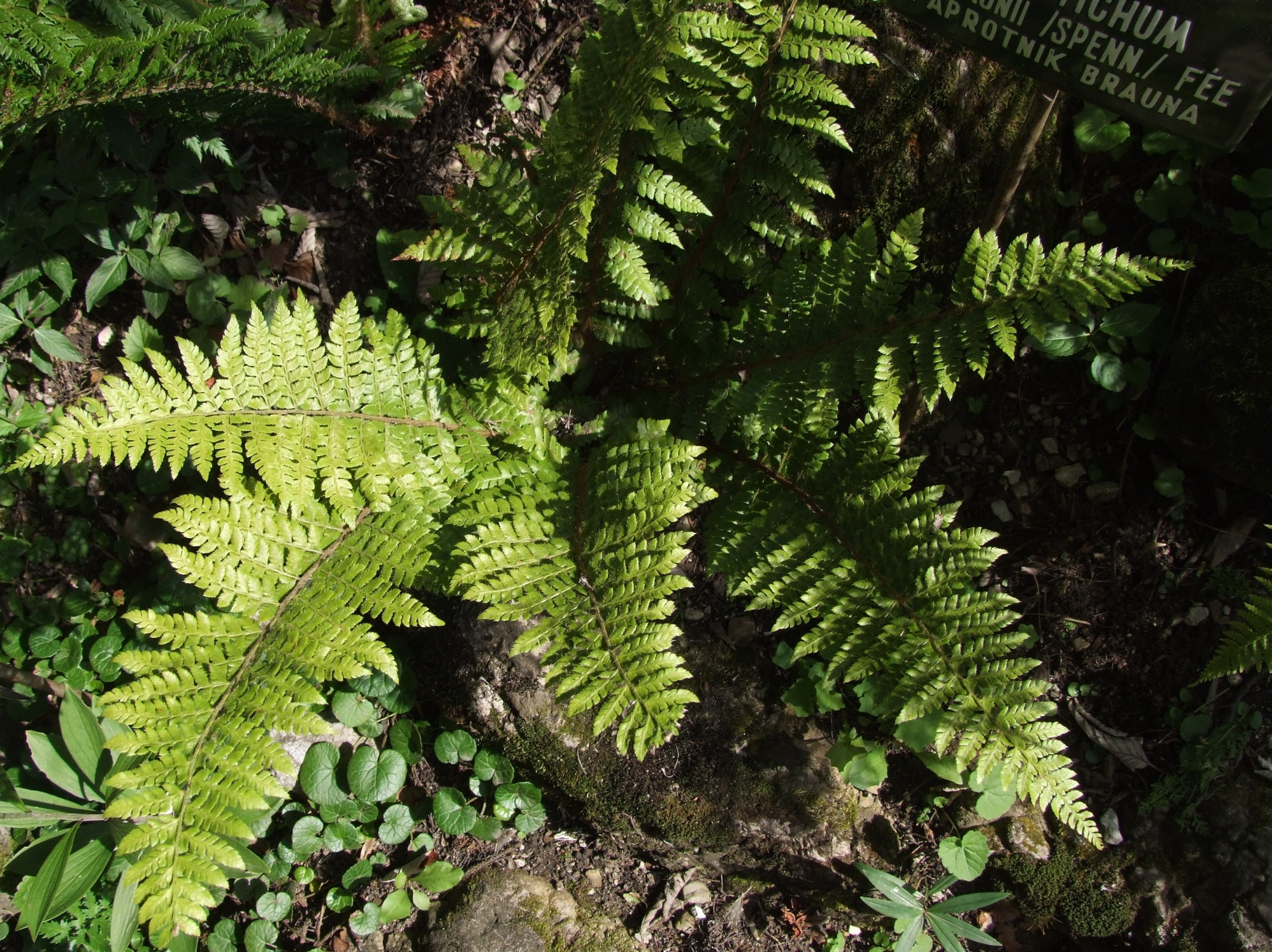

Scientific classification
- Kingdom: Plantae
- Clade: Tracheophytes
- Division: Polypodiophyta
- Class: Polypodiopsida
- Order: Polypodiales
- Suborder: Polypodiineae
- Family: Dryopteridaceae
- Genus: Polystichum
- Species: P. braunii

Binomial name
- Polystichum braunii (Spenn.) Fée, 1852

= Polystichum braunii =

Species of fern

Polystichum braunii, commonly known as Braun's hollyfern, is a species of plant.

It is native to Eurasia and North America.
