= List of the bryophytes of Canada =

Parent page: Flora of Canada

This is a listing of the non-vascular plants of Canada, and includes the mosses, liverworts and hornworts.

Secure	Apparently secure	Vulnerable	Imperiled	Critically imperiled	Not assessed	Historical	Extirpated	Introduced

IDD - incomplete distribution data

== Anthocerotophyta (hornworts) ==
=== Anthocerotaceae ===
Species name	Range in Canada										Global rank	Notes
Species name	YK	NT			NU			LB	CA		Global rank	Notes
Species name	BC	AB	SK	MB	ON	QC	NB	PE	NS	NL	Global rank	Notes
Anthoceros fusiformis	YK	NT			NU			LB	CA		Vulnerable	IDD
Anthoceros fusiformis	BC	AB	SK	MB	ON	QC	NB	PE	NS	NF	Vulnerable	IDD
Anthoceros macounii	YK	NT			NU			LB	CA		Vulnerable	IDD
Anthoceros macounii	BC	AB	SK	MB	ON	QC	NB	PE	NS	NF	Vulnerable	IDD

=== Notothyladaceae ===
Species name	Range in Canada										Global rank	Notes
Species name	YK	NT			NU			LB	CA		Global rank	Notes
Species name	BC	AB	SK	MB	ON	QC	NB	PE	NS	NL	Global rank	Notes
Notothylas orbicularis	YK	NT			NU			LB	CA		Secure	IDD
Notothylas orbicularis	BC	AB	SK	MB	ON	QC	NB	PE	NS	NF	Secure	IDD
Phaeoceros carolinianus	YK	NT			NU			LB	CA		Secure	IDD
Phaeoceros carolinianus	BC	AB	SK	MB	ON	QC	NB	PE	NS	NF	Secure	IDD

== Bryophyta (mosses) ==
=== Andreaeaceae ===
Species name	Range in Canada										Global rank	Notes
Species name	YK	NT			NU			LB	CA		Global rank	Notes
Species name	BC	AB	SK	MB	ON	QC	NB	PE	NS	NL	Global rank	Notes
Andreaea alpestris	YK	NT			NU			LB	CA		Secure	IDD
Andreaea alpestris	BC	AB	SK	MB	ON	QC	NB	PE	NS	NF	Secure	IDD
Andreaea blyttii	YK	NT			NU			LB	CA		Secure	IDD
Andreaea blyttii	BC	AB	SK	MB	ON	QC	NB	PE	NS	NF	Secure	IDD
Andreaea crassinervia	YK	NT			NU			LB	CA		Secure	IDD
Andreaea crassinervia	BC	AB	SK	MB	ON	QC	NB	PE	NS	NF	Secure	IDD
Andreaea heinemannii	YK	NT			NU			LB	CA		Apparently secure	IDD
Andreaea heinemannii	BC	AB	SK	MB	ON	QC	NB	PE	NS	NF	Apparently secure	IDD
Andreaea megistospora	YK	NT			NU			LB	CA		Apparently secure	IDD
Andreaea megistospora	BC	AB	SK	MB	ON	QC	NB	PE	NS	NF	Apparently secure	IDD
Andreaea mutabilis	YK	NT			NU			LB	CA		Secure	IDD
Andreaea mutabilis	BC	AB	SK	MB	ON	QC	NB	PE	NS	NF	Secure	IDD
Andreaea nivalis	YK	NT			NU			LB	CA		Secure	IDD
Andreaea nivalis	BC	AB	SK	MB	ON	QC	NB	PE	NS	NF	Secure	IDD
Andreaea obovata	YK	NT			NU			LB	CA		Apparently secure	IDD
Andreaea obovata	BC	AB	SK	MB	ON	QC	NB	PE	NS	NF	Apparently secure	IDD
Andreaea rothii	YK	NT			NU			LB	CA		Secure	IDD
Andreaea rothii	BC	AB	SK	MB	ON	QC	NB	PE	NS	NF	Secure	IDD
Andreaea rupestris	YK	NT			NU			LB	CA		Secure	IDD
Andreaea rupestris	BC	AB	SK	MB	ON	QC	NB	PE	NS	NF	Secure	IDD
Andreaea schofieldiana	YK	NT			NU			LB	CA		Imperiled	IDD
Andreaea schofieldiana	BC	AB	SK	MB	ON	QC	NB	PE	NS	NF	Imperiled	IDD
Andreaea sinuosa	YK	NT			NU			LB	CA		Imperiled	IDD
Andreaea sinuosa	BC	AB	SK	MB	ON	QC	NB	PE	NS	NF	Imperiled	IDD

=== Andreaeobryaceae ===
Species name	Range in Canada										Global rank	Notes
Species name	YK	NT			NU			LB	CA		Global rank	Notes
Species name	BC	AB	SK	MB	ON	QC	NB	PE	NS	NL	Global rank	Notes
Andreaeobryum macrosporum	YK	NT			NU			LB	CA		Imperiled	IDD
Andreaeobryum macrosporum	BC	AB	SK	MB	ON	QC	NB	PE	NS	NF	Imperiled	IDD

=== Archidiaceae ===
Species name	Range in Canada										Global rank	Notes
Species name	YK	NT			NU			LB	CA		Global rank	Notes
Species name	BC	AB	SK	MB	ON	QC	NB	PE	NS	NL	Global rank	Notes
Archidium ohioense	YK	NT			NU			LB	CA		Apparently secure	IDD
Archidium ohioense	BC	AB	SK	MB	ON	QC	NB	PE	NS	NF	Apparently secure	IDD

=== Aulacomniaceae ===
Species name	Range in Canada										Global rank	Notes
Species name	YK	NT			NU			LB	CA		Global rank	Notes
Species name	BC	AB	SK	MB	ON	QC	NB	PE	NS	NL	Global rank	Notes
Aulacomnium acuminatum Acute-tip aulacomnium moss	YK	NT			NU			LB	CA		Vulnerable	IDD
Aulacomnium acuminatum Acute-tip aulacomnium moss	BC	AB	SK	MB	ON	QC	NB	PE	NS	NF	Vulnerable	IDD
Aulacomnium androgynum	YK	NT			NU			LB	CA		Secure	IDD
Aulacomnium androgynum	BC	AB	SK	MB	ON	QC	NB	PE	NS	NF	Secure	IDD
Aulacomnium heterostichum	YK	NT			NU			LB	CA		Secure	IDD
Aulacomnium heterostichum	BC	AB	SK	MB	ON	QC	NB	PE	NS	NF	Secure	IDD
Aulacomnium palustre	YK	NT			NU			LB	CA		Secure	IDD
Aulacomnium palustre	BC	AB	SK	MB	ON	QC	NB	PE	NS	NF	Secure	IDD
Aulacomnium turgidum	YK	NT			NU			LB	CA		Secure	IDD
Aulacomnium turgidum	BC	AB	SK	MB	ON	QC	NB	PE	NS	NF	Secure	IDD

=== Bartramiaceae ===
Species name	Range in Canada										Global rank	Notes
Species name	YK	NT			NU			LB	CA		Global rank	Notes
Species name	BC	AB	SK	MB	ON	QC	NB	PE	NS	NL	Global rank	Notes
Anacolia menziesii	YK	NT			NU			LB	CA		Apparently secure	IDD
Anacolia menziesii	BC	AB	SK	MB	ON	QC	NB	PE	NS	NF	Apparently secure	IDD
Bartramia halleriana	YK	NT			NU			LB	CA		Apparently secure	IDD; COSEWIC: Threatened
Bartramia halleriana	BC	AB	SK	MB	ON	QC	NB	PE	NS	NF	Apparently secure	IDD; COSEWIC: Threatened
Bartramia ithyphylla	YK	NT			NU			LB	CA		Apparently secure	IDD
Bartramia ithyphylla	BC	AB	SK	MB	ON	QC	NB	PE	NS	NF	Apparently secure	IDD
Bartramia pomiformis	YK	NT			NU			LB	CA		Secure	IDD
Bartramia pomiformis	BC	AB	SK	MB	ON	QC	NB	PE	NS	NF	Secure	IDD
Bartramia stricta	YK	NT			NU			LB	CA		Not assessed	IDD; COSEWIC: Endangered
Bartramia stricta	BC	AB	SK	MB	ON	QC	NB	PE	NS	NF	Not assessed	IDD; COSEWIC: Endangered
Conostomum tetragonum	YK	NT			NU			LB	CA		Secure	IDD
Conostomum tetragonum	BC	AB	SK	MB	ON	QC	NB	PE	NS	NF	Secure	IDD
Philonotis capillaris	YK	NT			NU			LB	CA		Apparently secure	IDD
Philonotis capillaris	BC	AB	SK	MB	ON	QC	NB	PE	NS	NF	Apparently secure	IDD
Philonotis fontana American philonotis moss	YK	NT			NU			LB	CA		Secure	IDD
Philonotis fontana American philonotis moss	BC	AB	SK	MB	ON	QC	NB	PE	NS	NF	Secure	IDD
Philonotis marchica	YK	NT			NU			LB	CA		Secure	IDD
Philonotis marchica	BC	AB	SK	MB	ON	QC	NB	PE	NS	NF	Secure	IDD
Philonotis yezoana	YK	NT			NU			LB	CA		Imperiled	IDD
Philonotis yezoana	BC	AB	SK	MB	ON	QC	NB	PE	NS	NF	Imperiled	IDD
Plagiopus oederiana	YK	NT			NU			LB	CA		Secure	IDD
Plagiopus oederiana	BC	AB	SK	MB	ON	QC	NB	PE	NS	NF	Secure	IDD

=== Bryaceae ===
Species name	Range in Canada										Global rank	Notes
Species name	YK	NT			NU			LB	CA		Global rank	Notes
Species name	BC	AB	SK	MB	ON	QC	NB	PE	NS	NL	Global rank	Notes
Anomobryum filiforme	YK	NT			NU			LB	CA		Apparently secure	IDD
Anomobryum filiforme	BC	AB	SK	MB	ON	QC	NB	PE	NS	NF	Apparently secure	IDD
Bryum algovicum	YK	NT			NU			LB	CA		Apparently secure	IDD
Bryum algovicum	BC	AB	SK	MB	ON	QC	NB	PE	NS	NF	Apparently secure	IDD
Bryum alpinum	YK	NT			NU			LB	CA		Apparently secure	IDD
Bryum alpinum	BC	AB	SK	MB	ON	QC	NB	PE	NS	NF	Apparently secure	IDD
Bryum amblyodon	YK	NT			NU			LB	CA		Secure	IDD
Bryum amblyodon	BC	AB	SK	MB	ON	QC	NB	PE	NS	NF	Secure	IDD
Bryum archangelicum	YK	NT			NU			LB	CA		Apparently secure	IDD
Bryum archangelicum	BC	AB	SK	MB	ON	QC	NB	PE	NS	NF	Apparently secure	IDD
Bryum arcticum	YK	NT			NU			LB	CA		Secure	IDD
Bryum arcticum	BC	AB	SK	MB	ON	QC	NB	PE	NS	NF	Secure	IDD
Bryum argenteum Silvery bryum moss	YK	NT			NU			LB	CA		Secure	IDD
Bryum argenteum Silvery bryum moss	BC	AB	SK	MB	ON	QC	NB	PE	NS	NF	Secure	IDD
Bryum blindii	YK	NT			NU			LB	CA		Apparently secure	IDD
Bryum blindii	BC	AB	SK	MB	ON	QC	NB	PE	NS	NF	Apparently secure	IDD
Bryum caespiticium	YK	NT			NU			LB	CA		Secure	IDD
Bryum caespiticium	BC	AB	SK	MB	ON	QC	NB	PE	NS	NF	Secure	IDD
Bryum calobryoides	YK	NT			NU			LB	CA		Vulnerable	IDD
Bryum calobryoides	BC	AB	SK	MB	ON	QC	NB	PE	NS	NF	Vulnerable	IDD
Bryum calophyllum	YK	NT			NU			LB	CA		Secure	IDD
Bryum calophyllum	BC	AB	SK	MB	ON	QC	NB	PE	NS	NF	Secure	IDD
Bryum canariense	YK	NT			NU			LB	CA		Apparently secure	IDD
Bryum canariense	BC	AB	SK	MB	ON	QC	NB	PE	NS	NF	Apparently secure	IDD
Bryum capillare	YK	NT			NU			LB	CA		Secure	IDD
Bryum capillare	BC	AB	SK	MB	ON	QC	NB	PE	NS	NF	Secure	IDD
Bryum cyclophyllum	YK	NT			NU			LB	CA		Apparently secure	IDD
Bryum cyclophyllum	BC	AB	SK	MB	ON	QC	NB	PE	NS	NF	Apparently secure	IDD
Bryum dichotomum	YK	NT			NU			LB	CA		Not assessed	IDD
Bryum dichotomum	BC	AB	SK	MB	ON	QC	NB	PE	NS	NF	Not assessed	IDD
Bryum erythroloma	YK	NT			NU			LB	CA		Apparently secure	IDD
Bryum erythroloma	BC	AB	SK	MB	ON	QC	NB	PE	NS	NF	Apparently secure	IDD
Bryum flaccidum	YK	NT			NU			LB	CA		Secure	IDD
Bryum flaccidum	BC	AB	SK	MB	ON	QC	NB	PE	NS	NF	Secure	IDD
Bryum gemmascens	YK	NT			NU			LB	CA		Apparently secure	IDD
Bryum gemmascens	BC	AB	SK	MB	ON	QC	NB	PE	NS	NF	Apparently secure	IDD
Bryum gemmiparum	YK	NT			NU			LB	CA		Apparently secure	IDD
Bryum gemmiparum	BC	AB	SK	MB	ON	QC	NB	PE	NS	NF	Apparently secure	IDD
Bryum klinggraeffii	YK	NT			NU			LB	CA		Apparently secure	IDD
Bryum klinggraeffii	BC	AB	SK	MB	ON	QC	NB	PE	NS	NF	Apparently secure	IDD
Bryum knowltonii	YK	NT			NU			LB	CA		Vulnerable	IDD
Bryum knowltonii	BC	AB	SK	MB	ON	QC	NB	PE	NS	NF	Vulnerable	IDD
Bryum lisae	YK	NT			NU			LB	CA		Secure	IDD
Bryum lisae	BC	AB	SK	MB	ON	QC	NB	PE	NS	NF	Secure	IDD
Bryum lonchocaulon	YK	NT			NU			LB	CA		Secure	IDD
Bryum lonchocaulon	BC	AB	SK	MB	ON	QC	NB	PE	NS	NF	Secure	IDD
Bryum longisetum	YK	NT			NU			LB	CA		Secure	IDD
Bryum longisetum	BC	AB	SK	MB	ON	QC	NB	PE	NS	NF	Secure	IDD
Bryum marratii	YK	NT			NU			LB	CA		Vulnerable	IDD
Bryum marratii	BC	AB	SK	MB	ON	QC	NB	PE	NS	NF	Vulnerable	IDD
Bryum meesioides	YK	NT			NU			LB	CA		Vulnerable	IDD
Bryum meesioides	BC	AB	SK	MB	ON	QC	NB	PE	NS	NF	Vulnerable	IDD
Bryum miniatum	YK	NT			NU			LB	CA		Vulnerable	IDD
Bryum miniatum	BC	AB	SK	MB	ON	QC	NB	PE	NS	NF	Vulnerable	IDD
Bryum muehlenbeckii	YK	NT			NU			LB	CA		Apparently secure	IDD
Bryum muehlenbeckii	BC	AB	SK	MB	ON	QC	NB	PE	NS	NF	Apparently secure	IDD
Bryum nitidulum	YK	NT			NU			LB	CA		Apparently secure	IDD
Bryum nitidulum	BC	AB	SK	MB	ON	QC	NB	PE	NS	NF	Apparently secure	IDD
Bryum oblongum	YK	NT			NU			LB	CA		Apparently secure	IDD
Bryum oblongum	BC	AB	SK	MB	ON	QC	NB	PE	NS	NF	Apparently secure	IDD
Bryum pallens	YK	NT			NU			LB	CA		Apparently secure	IDD
Bryum pallens	BC	AB	SK	MB	ON	QC	NB	PE	NS	NF	Apparently secure	IDD
Bryum pallescens	YK	NT			NU			LB	CA		Secure	IDD
Bryum pallescens	BC	AB	SK	MB	ON	QC	NB	PE	NS	NF	Secure	IDD
Bryum pseudotriquetrum	YK	NT			NU			LB	CA		Secure	IDD
Bryum pseudotriquetrum	BC	AB	SK	MB	ON	QC	NB	PE	NS	NF	Secure	IDD
Bryum purpurascens	YK	NT			NU			LB	CA		Vulnerable	IDD
Bryum purpurascens	BC	AB	SK	MB	ON	QC	NB	PE	NS	NF	Vulnerable	IDD
Bryum ruderale	YK	NT			NU			LB	CA		Apparently secure	IDD
Bryum ruderale	BC	AB	SK	MB	ON	QC	NB	PE	NS	NF	Apparently secure	IDD
Bryum salinum	YK	NT			NU			LB	CA		Vulnerable	IDD
Bryum salinum	BC	AB	SK	MB	ON	QC	NB	PE	NS	NF	Vulnerable	IDD
Bryum schleicheri	YK	NT			NU			LB	CA		Secure	IDD
Bryum schleicheri	BC	AB	SK	MB	ON	QC	NB	PE	NS	NF	Secure	IDD
Bryum stirtonii	YK	NT			NU			LB	CA		Secure	IDD
Bryum stirtonii	BC	AB	SK	MB	ON	QC	NB	PE	NS	NF	Secure	IDD
Bryum subapiculatum	YK	NT			NU			LB	CA		Secure	IDD
Bryum subapiculatum	BC	AB	SK	MB	ON	QC	NB	PE	NS	NF	Secure	IDD
Bryum subneodamense	YK	NT			NU			LB	CA		Vulnerable	IDD
Bryum subneodamense	BC	AB	SK	MB	ON	QC	NB	PE	NS	NF	Vulnerable	IDD
Bryum tenuisetum	YK	NT			NU			LB	CA		Apparently secure	IDD
Bryum tenuisetum	BC	AB	SK	MB	ON	QC	NB	PE	NS	NF	Apparently secure	IDD
Bryum teres	YK	NT			NU			LB	CA		Not assessed	IDD
Bryum teres	BC	AB	SK	MB	ON	QC	NB	PE	NS	NF	Not assessed	IDD
Bryum turbinatum	YK	NT			NU			LB	CA		Secure	IDD
Bryum turbinatum	BC	AB	SK	MB	ON	QC	NB	PE	NS	NF	Secure	IDD
Bryum uliginosum	YK	NT			NU			LB	CA		Apparently secure	IDD
Bryum uliginosum	BC	AB	SK	MB	ON	QC	NB	PE	NS	NF	Apparently secure	IDD
Bryum violaceum	YK	NT			NU			LB	CA		Secure	IDD
Bryum violaceum	BC	AB	SK	MB	ON	QC	NB	PE	NS	NF	Secure	IDD
Bryum warneum	YK	NT			NU			LB	CA		Secure	IDD
Bryum warneum	BC	AB	SK	MB	ON	QC	NB	PE	NS	NF	Secure	IDD
Bryum weigelii	YK	NT			NU			LB	CA		Apparently secure	IDD
Bryum weigelii	BC	AB	SK	MB	ON	QC	NB	PE	NS	NF	Apparently secure	IDD
Bryum wrightii	YK	NT			NU			LB	CA		Vulnerable	IDD
Bryum wrightii	BC	AB	SK	MB	ON	QC	NB	PE	NS	NF	Vulnerable	IDD
Epipterygium tozeri	YK	NT			NU			LB	CA		Apparently secure	IDD
Epipterygium tozeri	BC	AB	SK	MB	ON	QC	NB	PE	NS	NF	Apparently secure	IDD
Leptobryum pyriforme	YK	NT			NU			LB	CA		Secure	IDD
Leptobryum pyriforme	BC	AB	SK	MB	ON	QC	NB	PE	NS	NF	Secure	IDD
Mielichhoferia macrocarpa	YK	NT			NU			LB	CA		Imperiled	IDD; COSEWIC: Threatened
Mielichhoferia macrocarpa	BC	AB	SK	MB	ON	QC	NB	PE	NS	NF	Imperiled	IDD; COSEWIC: Threatened
Mielichhoferia mielichhoferiana	YK	NT			NU			LB	CA		Apparently secure	IDD
Mielichhoferia mielichhoferiana	BC	AB	SK	MB	ON	QC	NB	PE	NS	NF	Apparently secure	IDD
Plagiobryum demissum	YK	NT			NU			LB	CA		Apparently secure	IDD
Plagiobryum demissum	BC	AB	SK	MB	ON	QC	NB	PE	NS	NF	Apparently secure	IDD
Plagiobryum zieri	YK	NT			NU			LB	CA		Apparently secure	IDD
Plagiobryum zieri	BC	AB	SK	MB	ON	QC	NB	PE	NS	NF	Apparently secure	IDD
Pohlia andalusica	YK	NT			NU			LB	CA		Apparently secure	IDD
Pohlia andalusica	BC	AB	SK	MB	ON	QC	NB	PE	NS	NF	Apparently secure	IDD
Pohlia annotina	YK	NT			NU			LB	CA		Apparently secure	IDD
Pohlia annotina	BC	AB	SK	MB	ON	QC	NB	PE	NS	NF	Apparently secure	IDD
Pohlia atropurpurea	YK	NT			NU			LB	CA		Apparently secure	IDD
Pohlia atropurpurea	BC	AB	SK	MB	ON	QC	NB	PE	NS	NF	Apparently secure	IDD
Pohlia bolanderi	YK	NT			NU			LB	CA		Vulnerable	IDD
Pohlia bolanderi	BC	AB	SK	MB	ON	QC	NB	PE	NS	NF	Vulnerable	IDD
Pohlia brevinervis	YK	NT			NU			LB	CA		Critically imperiled	IDD
Pohlia brevinervis	BC	AB	SK	MB	ON	QC	NB	PE	NS	NF	Critically imperiled	IDD
Pohlia bulbifera	YK	NT			NU			LB	CA		Apparently secure	IDD
Pohlia bulbifera	BC	AB	SK	MB	ON	QC	NB	PE	NS	NF	Apparently secure	IDD
Pohlia camptotrachela	YK	NT			NU			LB	CA		Apparently secure	IDD
Pohlia camptotrachela	BC	AB	SK	MB	ON	QC	NB	PE	NS	NF	Apparently secure	IDD
Pohlia cardotii	YK	NT			NU			LB	CA		Not assessed	IDD
Pohlia cardotii	BC	AB	SK	MB	ON	QC	NB	PE	NS	NF	Not assessed	IDD
Pohlia columbica	YK	NT			NU			LB	CA		Apparently secure	IDD
Pohlia columbica	BC	AB	SK	MB	ON	QC	NB	PE	NS	NF	Apparently secure	IDD
Pohlia cruda	YK	NT			NU			LB	CA		Secure	IDD
Pohlia cruda	BC	AB	SK	MB	ON	QC	NB	PE	NS	NF	Secure	IDD
Pohlia crudoides	YK	NT			NU			LB	CA		Vulnerable	IDD
Pohlia crudoides	BC	AB	SK	MB	ON	QC	NB	PE	NS	NF	Vulnerable	IDD
Pohlia drummondii	YK	NT			NU			LB	CA		Vulnerable	IDD
Pohlia drummondii	BC	AB	SK	MB	ON	QC	NB	PE	NS	NF	Vulnerable	IDD
Pohlia elongata	YK	NT			NU			LB	CA		Apparently secure	IDD
Pohlia elongata	BC	AB	SK	MB	ON	QC	NB	PE	NS	NF	Apparently secure	IDD
Pohlia erecta	YK	NT			NU			LB	CA		Apparently secure	IDD
Pohlia erecta	BC	AB	SK	MB	ON	QC	NB	PE	NS	NF	Apparently secure	IDD
Pohlia filum	YK	NT			NU			LB	CA		Apparently secure	IDD
Pohlia filum	BC	AB	SK	MB	ON	QC	NB	PE	NS	NF	Apparently secure	IDD
Pohlia lescuriana	YK	NT			NU			LB	CA		Apparently secure	IDD
Pohlia lescuriana	BC	AB	SK	MB	ON	QC	NB	PE	NS	NF	Apparently secure	IDD
Pohlia longibracteata	YK	NT			NU			LB	CA		Apparently secure	IDD
Pohlia longibracteata	BC	AB	SK	MB	ON	QC	NB	PE	NS	NF	Apparently secure	IDD
Pohlia longicolla	YK	NT			NU			LB	CA		Apparently secure	IDD
Pohlia longicolla	BC	AB	SK	MB	ON	QC	NB	PE	NS	NF	Apparently secure	IDD
Pohlia ludwigii	YK	NT			NU			LB	CA		Secure	IDD
Pohlia ludwigii	BC	AB	SK	MB	ON	QC	NB	PE	NS	NF	Secure	IDD
Pohlia melanodon	YK	NT			NU			LB	CA		Apparently secure	IDD
Pohlia melanodon	BC	AB	SK	MB	ON	QC	NB	PE	NS	NF	Apparently secure	IDD
Pohlia nutans	YK	NT			NU			LB	CA		Secure	IDD
Pohlia nutans	BC	AB	SK	MB	ON	QC	NB	PE	NS	NF	Secure	IDD
Pohlia obtusifolia	YK	NT			NU			LB	CA		Vulnerable	IDD
Pohlia obtusifolia	BC	AB	SK	MB	ON	QC	NB	PE	NS	NF	Vulnerable	IDD
Pohlia pacifica	YK	NT			NU			LB	CA		Not assessed	IDD
Pohlia pacifica	BC	AB	SK	MB	ON	QC	NB	PE	NS	NF	Not assessed	IDD
Pohlia proligera	YK	NT			NU			LB	CA		Apparently secure	IDD
Pohlia proligera	BC	AB	SK	MB	ON	QC	NB	PE	NS	NF	Apparently secure	IDD
Pohlia sphagnicola	YK	NT			NU			LB	CA		Imperiled	IDD
Pohlia sphagnicola	BC	AB	SK	MB	ON	QC	NB	PE	NS	NF	Imperiled	IDD
Pohlia tundrae	YK	NT			NU			LB	CA		Imperiled	IDD
Pohlia tundrae	BC	AB	SK	MB	ON	QC	NB	PE	NS	NF	Imperiled	IDD
Pohlia vexans	YK	NT			NU			LB	CA		Apparently secure	IDD
Pohlia vexans	BC	AB	SK	MB	ON	QC	NB	PE	NS	NF	Apparently secure	IDD
Pohlia wahlenbergii	YK	NT			NU			LB	CA		Secure	IDD
Pohlia wahlenbergii	BC	AB	SK	MB	ON	QC	NB	PE	NS	NF	Secure	IDD
Rhodobryum ontariense	YK	NT			NU			LB	CA		Secure	IDD
Rhodobryum ontariense	BC	AB	SK	MB	ON	QC	NB	PE	NS	NF	Secure	IDD
Rhodobryum roseum Rose moss	YK	NT			NU			LB	CA		Secure	IDD
Rhodobryum roseum Rose moss	BC	AB	SK	MB	ON	QC	NB	PE	NS	NF	Secure	IDD
Roellia roellii	YK	NT			NU			LB	CA		Apparently secure	IDD
Roellia roellii	BC	AB	SK	MB	ON	QC	NB	PE	NS	NF	Apparently secure	IDD

=== Catoscopiaceae ===
Species name	Range in Canada										Global rank	Notes
Species name	YK	NT			NU			LB	CA		Global rank	Notes
Species name	BC	AB	SK	MB	ON	QC	NB	PE	NS	NL	Global rank	Notes
Catoscopium nigritum	YK	NT			NU			LB	CA		Apparently secure	IDD
Catoscopium nigritum	BC	AB	SK	MB	ON	QC	NB	PE	NS	NF	Apparently secure	IDD

=== Hypopterygiaceae ===
Species name	Range in Canada										Global rank	Notes
Species name	YK	NT			NU			LB	CA		Global rank	Notes
Species name	BC	AB	SK	MB	ON	QC	NB	PE	NS	NL	Global rank	Notes
Hypopterygium fauriei	YK	NT			NU			LB	CA		Apparently secure	IDD
Hypopterygium fauriei	BC	AB	SK	MB	ON	QC	NB	PE	NS	NF	Apparently secure	IDD

=== Meesiaceae ===
Species name	Range in Canada										Global rank	Notes
Species name	YK	NT			NU			LB	CA		Global rank	Notes
Species name	BC	AB	SK	MB	ON	QC	NB	PE	NS	NL	Global rank	Notes
Amblyodon dealbatus	YK	NT			NU			LB	CA		Apparently secure	IDD
Amblyodon dealbatus	BC	AB	SK	MB	ON	QC	NB	PE	NS	NF	Apparently secure	IDD
Meesia longiseta	YK	NT			NU			LB	CA		Apparently secure	IDD
Meesia longiseta	BC	AB	SK	MB	ON	QC	NB	PE	NS	NF	Apparently secure	IDD
Meesia triquetra	YK	NT			NU			LB	CA		Secure	IDD
Meesia triquetra	BC	AB	SK	MB	ON	QC	NB	PE	NS	NF	Secure	IDD
Meesia uliginosa	YK	NT			NU			LB	CA		Apparently secure	IDD
Meesia uliginosa	BC	AB	SK	MB	ON	QC	NB	PE	NS	NF	Apparently secure	IDD
Paludella squarrosa	YK	NT			NU			LB	CA		Apparently secure	IDD
Paludella squarrosa	BC	AB	SK	MB	ON	QC	NB	PE	NS	NF	Apparently secure	IDD

=== Mniaceae ===
Species name	Range in Canada										Global rank	Notes
Species name	YK	NT			NU			LB	CA		Global rank	Notes
Species name	BC	AB	SK	MB	ON	QC	NB	PE	NS	NL	Global rank	Notes
Cinclidium arcticum	YK	NT			NU			LB	CA		Apparently secure	IDD
Cinclidium arcticum	BC	AB	SK	MB	ON	QC	NB	PE	NS	NF	Apparently secure	IDD
Cinclidium latifolium	YK	NT			NU			LB	CA		Apparently secure	IDD
Cinclidium latifolium	BC	AB	SK	MB	ON	QC	NB	PE	NS	NF	Apparently secure	IDD
Cinclidium stygium	YK	NT			NU			LB	CA		Secure	IDD
Cinclidium stygium	BC	AB	SK	MB	ON	QC	NB	PE	NS	NF	Secure	IDD
Cinclidium subrotundum	YK	NT			NU			LB	CA		Not assessed	IDD
Cinclidium subrotundum	BC	AB	SK	MB	ON	QC	NB	PE	NS	NF	Not assessed	IDD
Cyrtomnium hymenophylloides	YK	NT			NU			LB	CA		Secure	IDD
Cyrtomnium hymenophylloides	BC	AB	SK	MB	ON	QC	NB	PE	NS	NF	Secure	IDD
