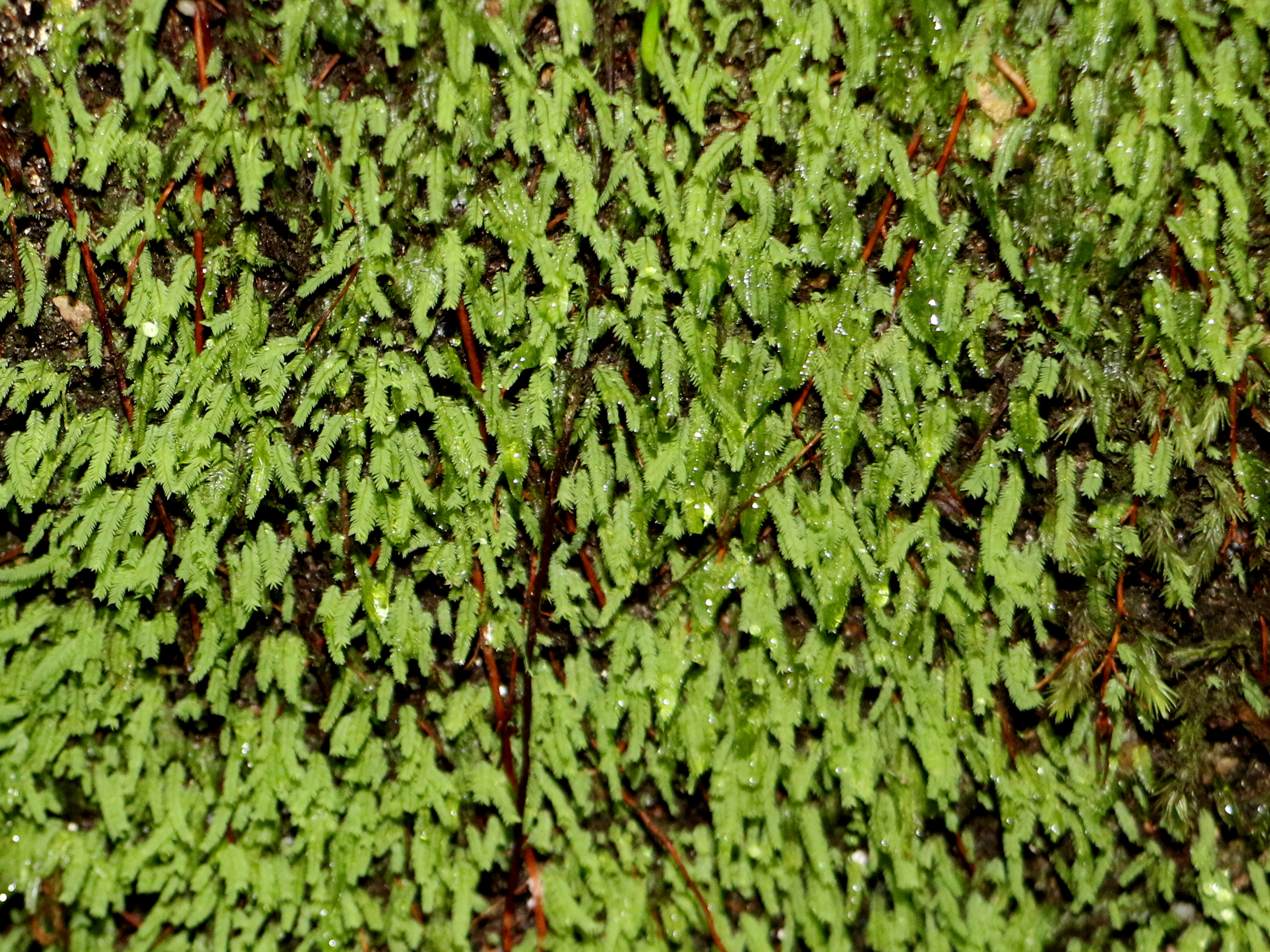
- moss at Watagans National Park, Australia

Scientific classification
- Kingdom: Plantae
- Division: Bryophyta
- Class: Bryopsida
- Subclass: Bryidae
- Order: Rhizogoniales
- Family: Rhizogoniaceae
- Genus: Rhizogonium
- Species: R. novaehollandiae

Binomial name
- Rhizogonium novaehollandiae (Brid.) Brid.

Synonyms
- Fissidens novaehollandiae Brid.; Skitophyllum novaehollandiae (Brid.) Bach.Pyl.; Hypnum novaehollandiae (Brid.) Arnott; Mnium novaehollandiae (Brid.) Müll.Hal.

= Rhizogonium novaehollandiae =

Species of moss

Rhizogonium novaehollandiae is a moss found in moist situations in Australia, New Zealand and Central and South America. In Australia it may be seen on wood, rock and tree ferns. This moss has creeping stems with erect or pendant branches, with two rows of leaves. The stem is clearly visible between them. When dry, the leaves fold towards each other. The length to width ratio of the leaves is less than three to one. The costa (vein/rib) is excurrent, showing a tip. The first European to collect this species was Jacques Labillardière. This plant first appeared in scientific literature in the year 1802, published by the German-Swiss bryologist Samuel Elisée Bridel-Brideri.
