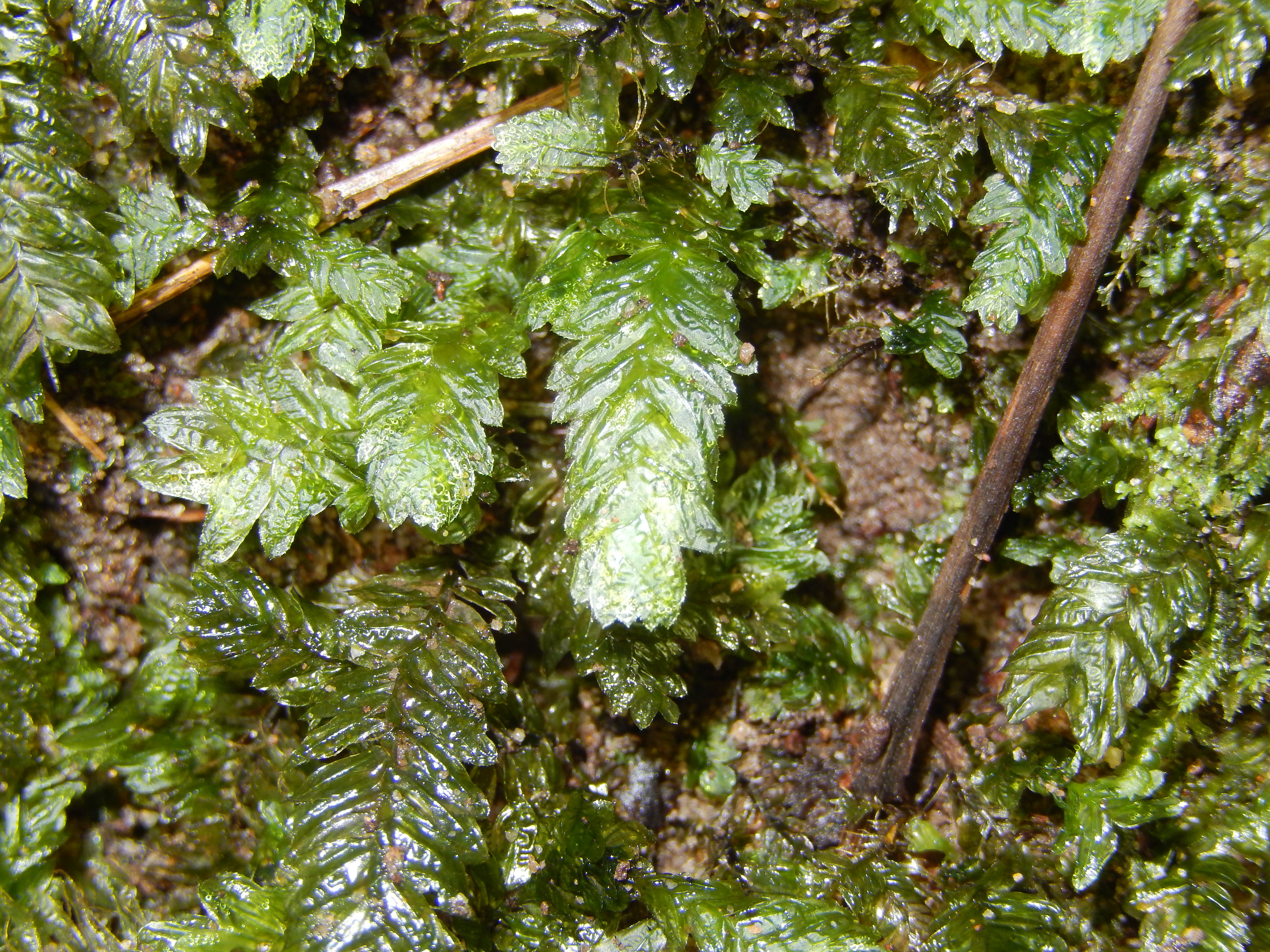
- moss at Sydney, Australia

Scientific classification
- Kingdom: Plantae
- Division: Bryophyta
- Class: Bryopsida
- Subclass: Bryidae
- Order: Rhizogoniales
- Family: Aulacomniaceae
- Genus: Mesochaete
- Species: M. undulata

Binomial name
- Mesochaete undulata (Lindb.)

Synonyms
- Mnium undulatum Müll.Hal.; Rhizogonium undulatum (Müll.Hal.); Rhizogonium plumaeforme Hampe

= Mesochaete undulata =

Species of moss

Mesochaete undulata is a moss found in Australia and Lord Howe Island. Usually seen in moist sites on rocks or soil beside streams. Plants may be large, up to 5 cm long. The stems are usually not branched, red at the base and yellowish green above. Leaves are large and spreading, rounded to blunt at the tips, 1.8 mm to 4.5 mm long. This plant first appeared in scientific literature in 1870, published in the Botanical Journal of the Linnean Society by the Swedish bryologist, Sextus Otto Lindberg.
