= Orthodontopsis bardunovii =

Conservation status
- Endangered (IUCN 2.3)

Scientific classification
- Kingdom: Plantae
- Division: Bryophyta
- Class: Bryopsida
- Subclass: Bryidae
- Order: Rhizogoniales
- Family: Orthodontiaceae
- Genus: Orthodontopsis
- Species: O. bardunovii

Binomial name
- Orthodontopsis bardunovii Ignatov & B.C. Tan

Species of moss

Orthodontopsis bardunovii is a species of moss in the family Orthodontiaceae. It is endemic to Russia, where it is known only from the Altai and Sayan Mountains. It grows on rotting logs in forested habitat and it is threatened by deforestation.
