= Mesochaete =

Scientific classification
- Kingdom: Plantae
- Division: Bryophyta
- Class: Bryopsida
- Subclass: Bryidae
- Order: Rhizogoniales
- Family: Aulacomniaceae
- Genus: Mesochaete; S.O.Lindberg, 1870

Genus of mosses

Mesochaete is a genus of mosses belonging to the family Rhizogoniaceae.

The species of this genus are found in Australia.

Species:

- Mesochaete taxiforme Watts & Whitelegge, 1902
- Mesochaete undulata Lindberg, 1870
