= Calomnion milleri =

Scientific classification
- Kingdom: Plantae
- Division: Bryophyta
- Class: Bryopsida
- Subclass: Bryidae
- Order: Rhizogoniales
- Family: Rhizogoniaceae
- Genus: Calomnion
- Species: C. milleri

Binomial name
- Calomnion milleri Hook. f. & Wilson

Species of moss

Calomnion milleri is a species of moss known only from Lord Howe Island in the Tasman Sea between Australia and New Zealand. It grows on the aerial adventitious roots of tree-ferns at elevations of 450–875 m.

Calomnion milleri is a small, dioecious, yellow-green plant rarely more than 10 mm tall. It has two types of leaves, both subulate (with a long, narrow tip). Setae are 0.8–1.0 mm long; cylindrical capsules 1.2–1.4 mm long. It is distinguished from other species in the genus by its thickened leaf margins, its capsules shorter than the setae, and the long, slender subulate leaves.
