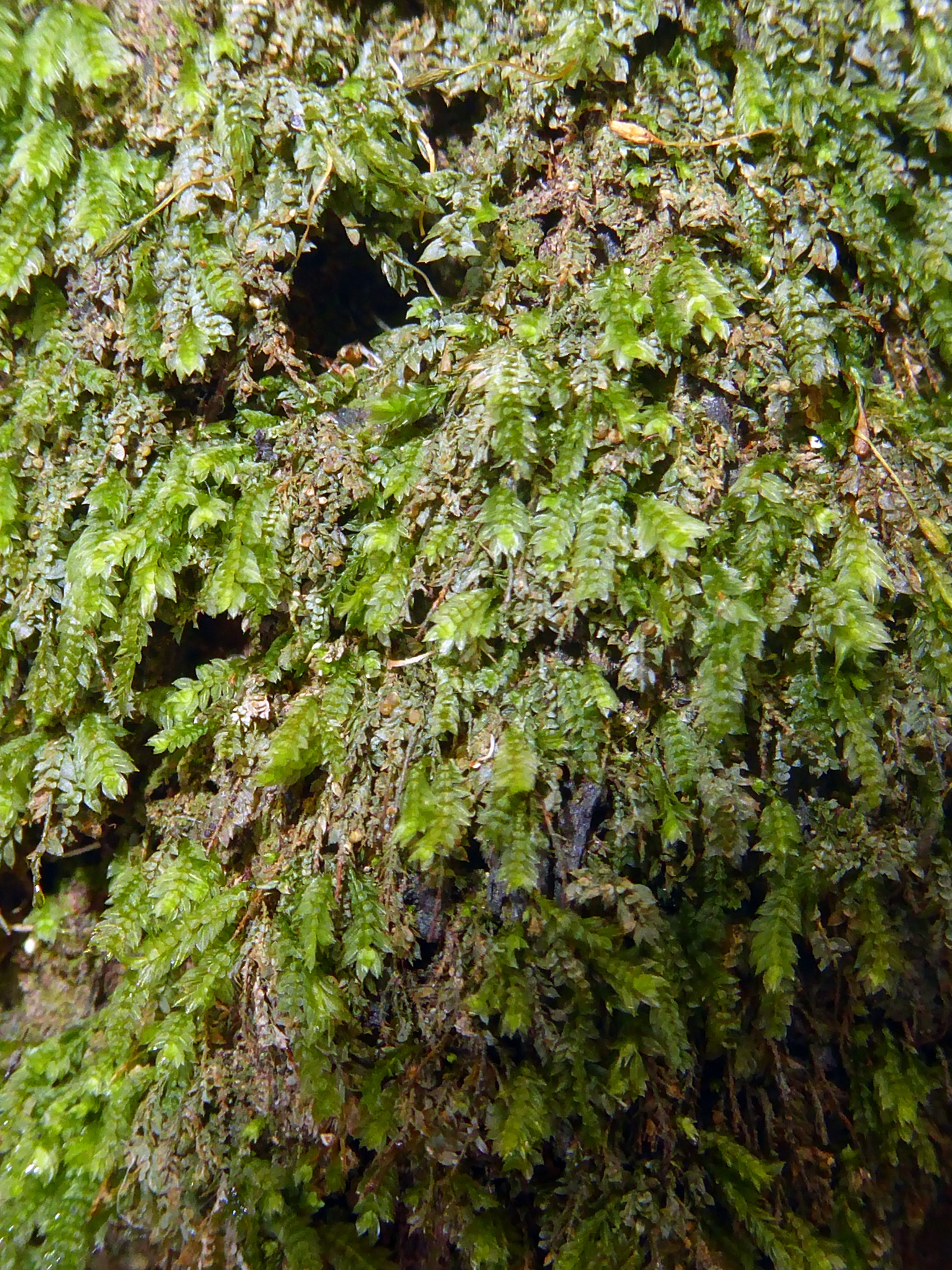

Conservation status
- Not Threatened (NZ TCS)

Scientific classification
- Kingdom: Plantae
- Clade: Embryophytes
- Division: Bryophyta
- Class: Bryopsida
- Subclass: Bryidae
- Order: Rhizogoniales
- Family: Rhizogoniaceae
- Genus: Calomnion
- Species: C. complanatum

Binomial name
- Calomnion complanatum (Hook.f. and Wilson) Lindb.

= Calomnion complanatum =

Species of moss

Calomnion complanatum is a species of moss native to Australia (New South Wales, Victoria, Tasmania) and New Zealand. It is the type species of the genus Calomnion, growing on the trunks of tree ferns. It is a small, yellow-green plant rarely more than 10 mm tall.

Within New South Wales, Calomnion complanatum is an endangered species reported from only 4 populations: Cambewarra Mountain, Rocky Creek Canyon on the Newnes Plateau, and two sites on Mount Wilson (Zircon Creek and Waterfall Reserve). It is listed as endangered in Victoria but rare and not endangered in Tasmania and 'Not Threatened' in New Zealand.
