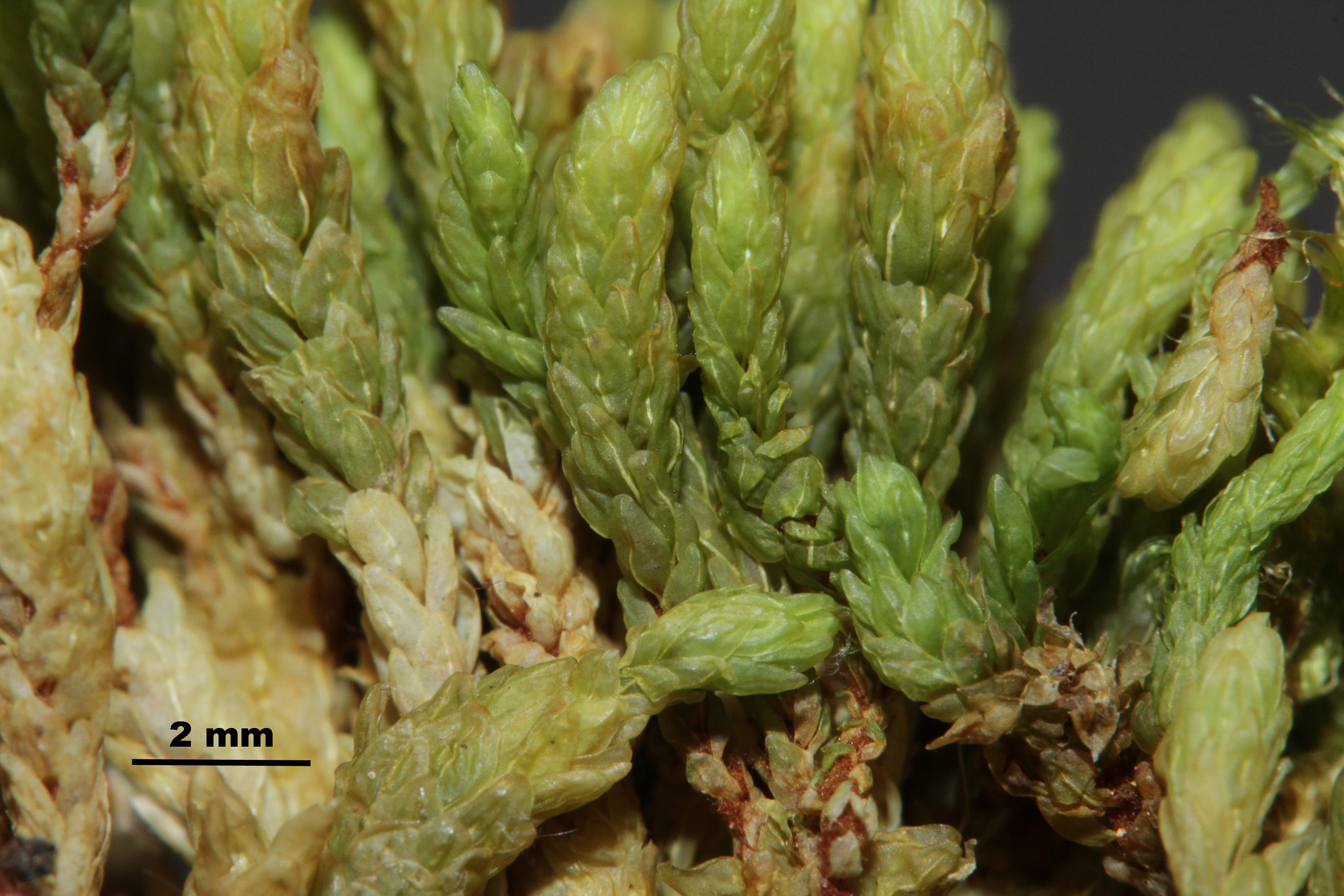

Scientific classification
- Kingdom: Plantae
- Division: Bryophyta
- Class: Bryopsida
- Subclass: Bryidae
- Order: Rhizogoniales
- Family: Aulacomniaceae
- Genus: Aulacomnium
- Species: A. turgidum

Binomial name
- Aulacomnium turgidum (Wahlenb.) Schwägr.

= Aulacomnium turgidum =

Species of moss

Aulacomnium turgidum, commonly called swollen thread-moss or mountain groove-moss, is a species of moss in the family Aulacomniaceae. It is found in the United States, Canada, Russia, Greenland, Norway and Scotland. It was extirpated from England in 1878 and has not reestablished since.

The shoots are up to 10 centimeters (4 inches) tall, with scales blunt, concave, 2.5 to 3 millimeters long and densely overlapping, which gives the shoots a swollen, turgid appearance. It is visually similar to the circumboreal ribbed bog moss (Aulacomnium palustre).

Aulacomnium turgidum grows on alkaline substrates in open habitats on ledges and crags, often in alpine environments.
