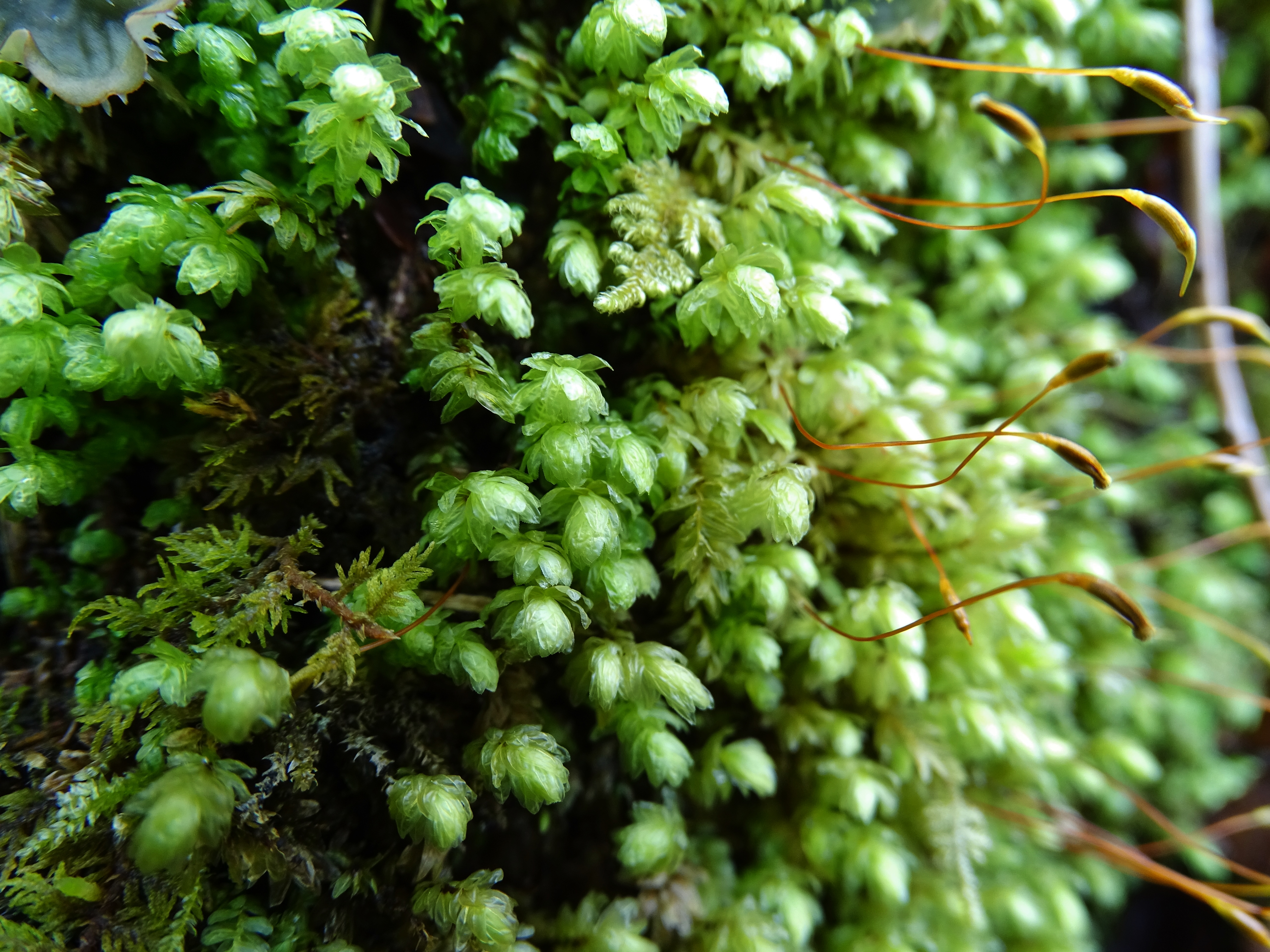
- Aulacomnium heterostichum in North Carolina, USA

Scientific classification
- Kingdom: Plantae
- Division: Bryophyta
- Class: Bryopsida
- Subclass: Bryidae
- Order: Rhizogoniales
- Family: Aulacomniaceae
- Genus: Aulacomnium
- Species: A. heterostichum

Binomial name
- Aulacomnium heterostichum (Hedw.) Bruch & Schimp.

Synonyms
- Arrhenopterum heterostichum

= Aulacomnium heterostichum =

Moss species native to North America

Aulacomnium heterostichum (synonym Arrhenopterum heterostichum), commonly called goose-egg moss or star moss, is a species of moss in the family Aulacomniaceae. It occurs in two widely disjunct regions: eastern North America (the eastern United States and Canada) and eastern Asia (China, Korea, Japan and the Russian Far East). In its North American range, it is commonly found on slopes growing directly on soil or, occasionally, at the bases of trees.

The name goose-egg moss refers to the egg-shaped leaf clusters produced at the ends of the stems, which detach and establish new plants in a form of asexual reproduction.

== Gallery ==
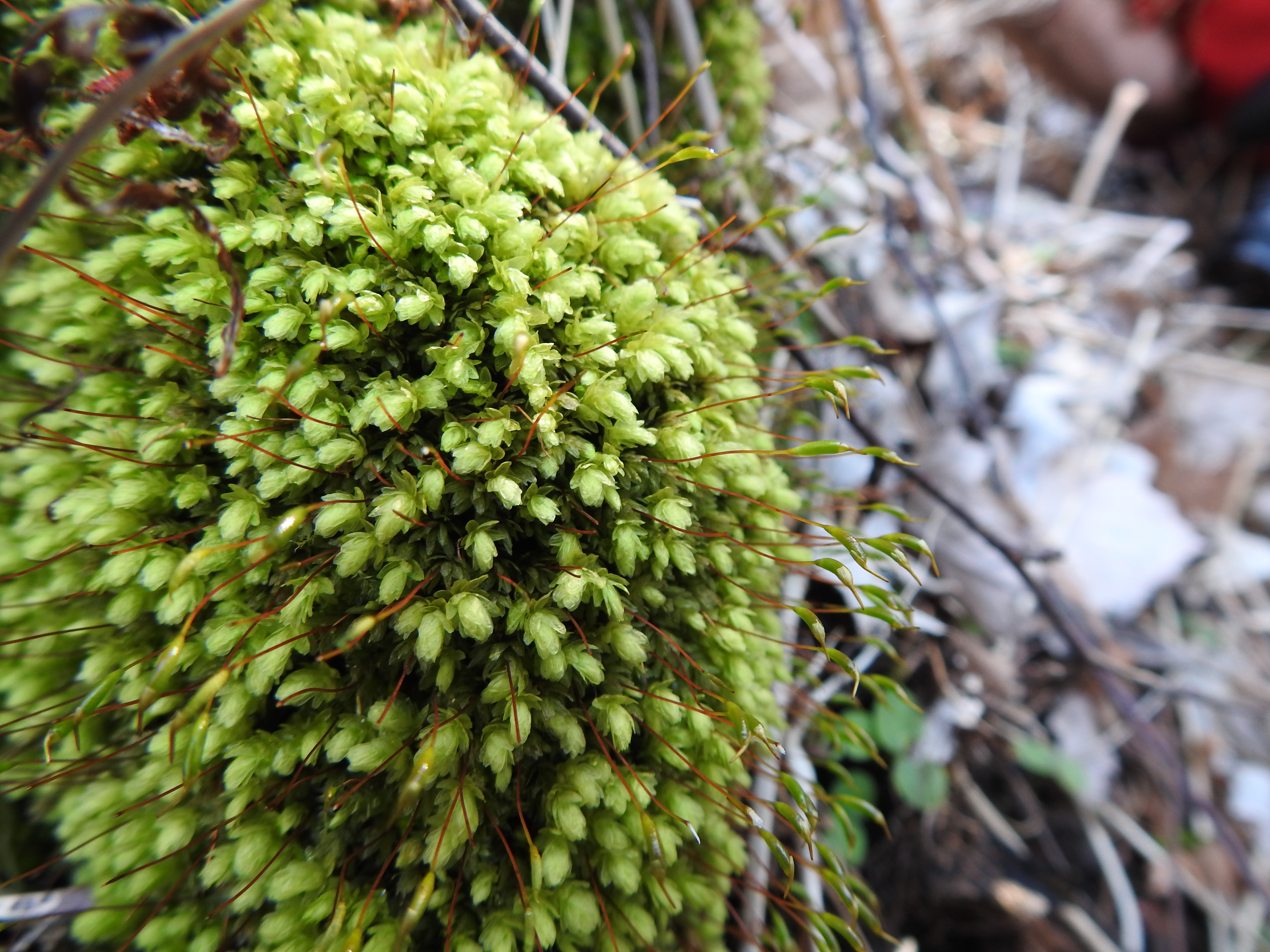
Aulacomnium heterostichum in Ontario, Canada.

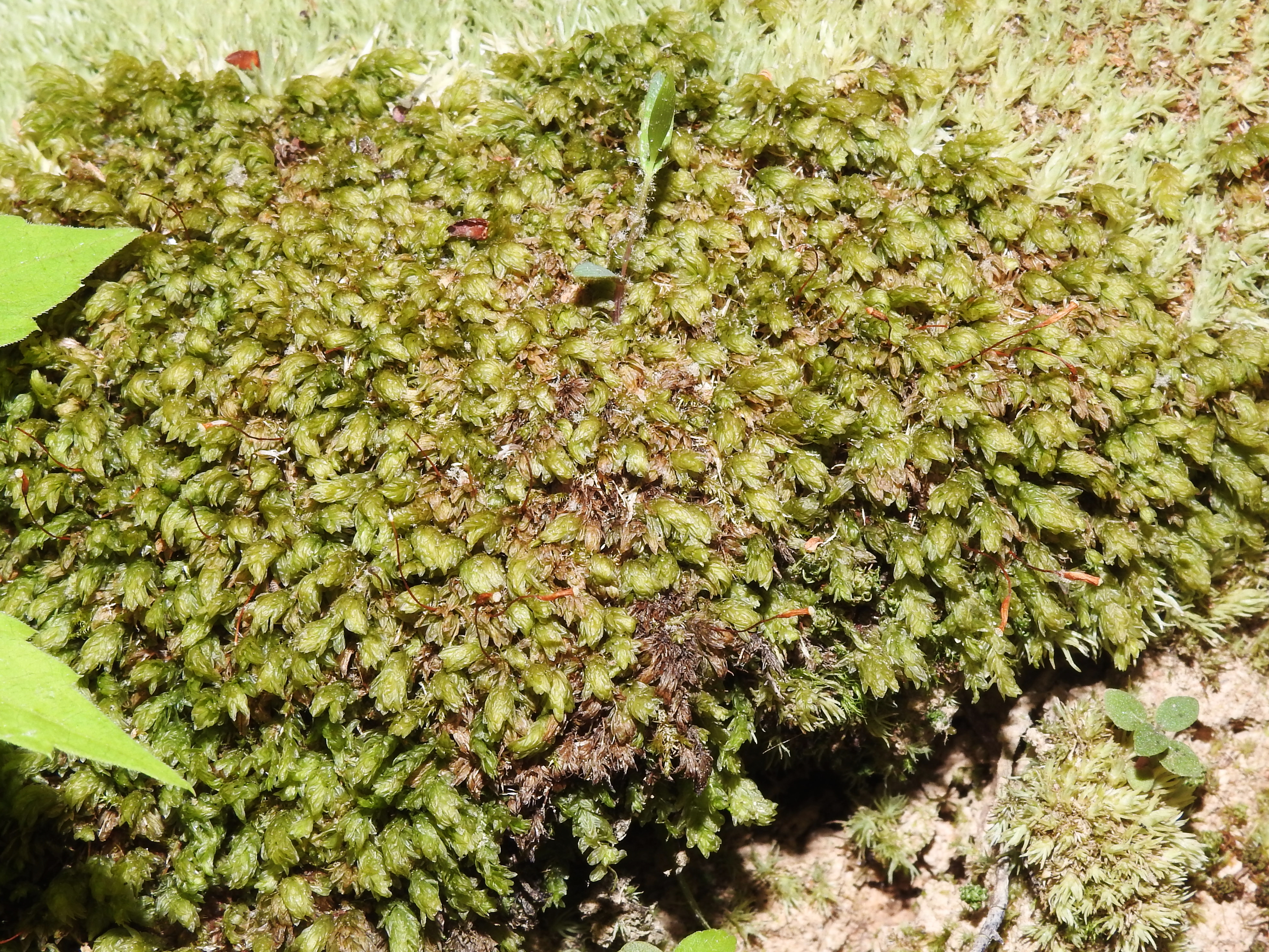
Aulacomnium heterostichum in Illinois, USA.
