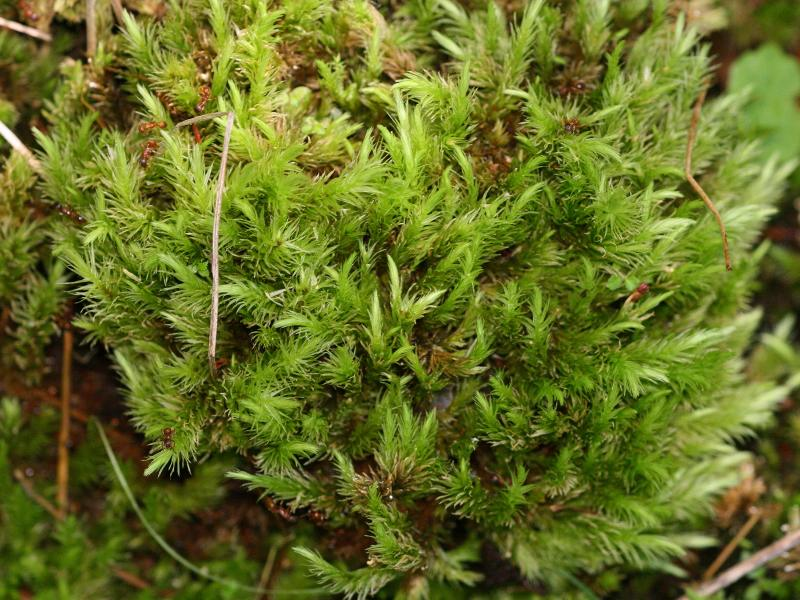
- Aulacomnium palustre

Scientific classification
- Kingdom: Plantae
- Division: Bryophyta
- Class: Bryopsida
- Subclass: Bryidae
- Order: Rhizogoniales
- Family: Aulacomniaceae
- Genus: Aulacomnium; Schwägr.

Species
- See text

= Aulacomnium =

Genus of Aulacomniaceae mosses

Aulacomnium is a genus of mosses of the family Aulacomniaceae, with a circumpolar distribution.

== Species ==
Species currently accepted by The Plant List are as follows:

- Aulacomnium acuminatum (Lindb. & Arnell) Kindb.
- Aulacomnium androgynum (Hedw.) Schwägr.
- Aulacomnium arenopaludosum M.F. Boiko
- †Aulacomnium heterostichoides Janssens, D.G. Horton & Basinger
- Aulacomnium heterostichum (Hedw.) Bruch & Schimp.
- Aulacomnium palustre (Hedw.) Schwägr.
- Aulacomnium papillosum (Müll. Hal.) A. Jaeger
- Aulacomnium pentastichum Mont.
- Aulacomnium stolonaceum Müll. Hal.
- Aulacomnium turgidum (Wahlenb.) Schwägr.
