= Leptotheca =

Leptotheca may refer to two different genera of organisms:

- Leptotheca Thélohan, 1895, a taxonomic synonym for Ceratomyxa, a genus of myxozoans
- Leptotheca Kunth, a genus of mosses in the family Orthodontiaceae
