= Orthodontopsis =

Scientific classification
- Kingdom: Plantae
- Division: Bryophyta
- Class: Bryopsida
- Subclass: Bryidae
- Order: Rhizogoniales
- Family: Orthodontiaceae
- Genus: Orthodontopsis; Ignatov & B.C.Tan

Genus of mosses

Orthodontopsis is a genus of moss in the family Orthodontiaceae. It contains two species:

- Orthodontopsis bardunovii, Ignatov & B.C.Tan
- Orthodontopsis lignicola, Ignatov & B.C.Tan
