= Aulacomnium acuminatum =

Scientific classification
- Kingdom: Plantae
- Division: Bryophyta
- Class: Bryopsida
- Subclass: Bryidae
- Order: Rhizogoniales
- Family: Aulacomniaceae
- Genus: Aulacomnium
- Species: A. acuminatum

Binomial name
- Aulacomnium acuminatum (Lindb. & Arnell) Kindb.

Species of moss

Aulacomnium acuminatum, commonly called sharp-leaved bog moss or acute-tipped aulacomnium moss, is a species of moss in the family Aulacomniaceae. It is found in Arctic regions of Canada and Alaska in the United States. It grows in calcareous soil in open tundra habitats.
