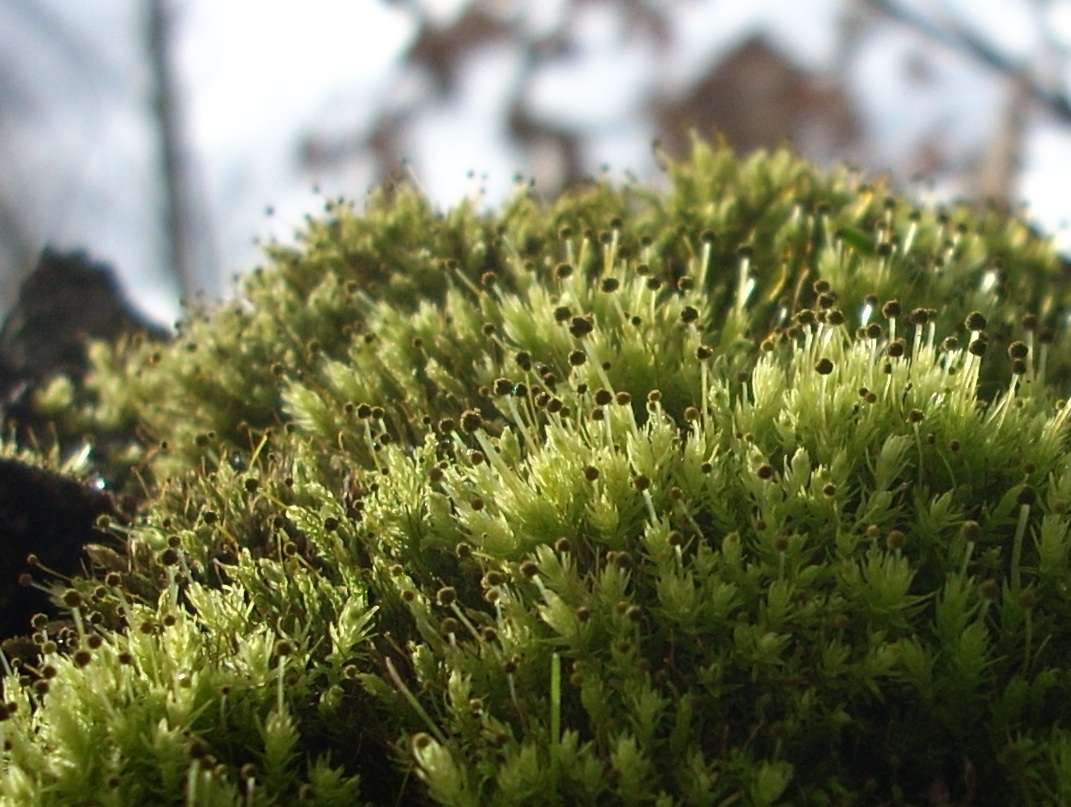

Scientific classification
- Kingdom: Plantae
- Division: Bryophyta
- Class: Bryopsida
- Subclass: Bryidae
- Order: Rhizogoniales
- Family: Aulacomniaceae
- Genus: Aulacomnium
- Species: A. androgynum

Binomial name
- Aulacomnium androgynum (Hedwig) Schwagrichen

= Aulacomnium androgynum =

Species of moss

Aulacomnium androgynum, the bud-headed groovemoss, is a species of moss with a discontinuous circumboreal distribution in Eurasia and North America. It grows on a variety of substrates, normally in moist, bottomland habitats.

Aulacomnium androgynum exhibits a unique form of asexual reproduction where a cluster of haploid vegetative structures known as propagula is produced at the end of a long stalk. This feature is the origin of the common name bud-headed groovemoss.
