= Karl Schliephacke =

German bryologist

Karl Schliephacke (2 August 1834, Halberstadt – 3 June 1913, Blasewitz) was a German bryologist known for his studies of sphagnum mosses.

== Biography ==
From 1851 he worked as an apprentice at the Löwenapotheke in Halle, and during his time spent in Halle he studied under bryologist Karl Müller. From 1859 onward, he worked in the lignite and mineral oil industries, of which, he is credited with the founding of several factories. During his career as an industrialist he held positions in Jeziorki (Galicia), Rehmsdorf (near Zeitz), Upper Röblingen and in Waldau (1873–1898).

He studied the local moss flora in the various areas in which he worked, and also conducted investigations of mosses during recreational excursions to the Alps. The moss genus Schliephackea (family Dicranaceae) was named in his honor by Karl Müller.

== Selected works ==
- 1865 Ueber das Genus Andreaea Ehrh. – About the genus Andreaea.
- 1865 Beiträge zur Kenntniss der Sphagna – Contributions to the understanding of sphagnum.
- 1883 Die Torfmoose der Thüringischen Flora : Floristische Mitteilungen – treatise on Thüringian sphagnum.
- 1885 Zwei neue Laubmoose aus der Schweiz. — Flora 19: 1–7.
- 1888 Ein neues Laubmoos aus der Schweiz. — Flora n.R. 46: 176–177.
- 1901 (with Karl Müller); Genera muscorum frondosorum.
