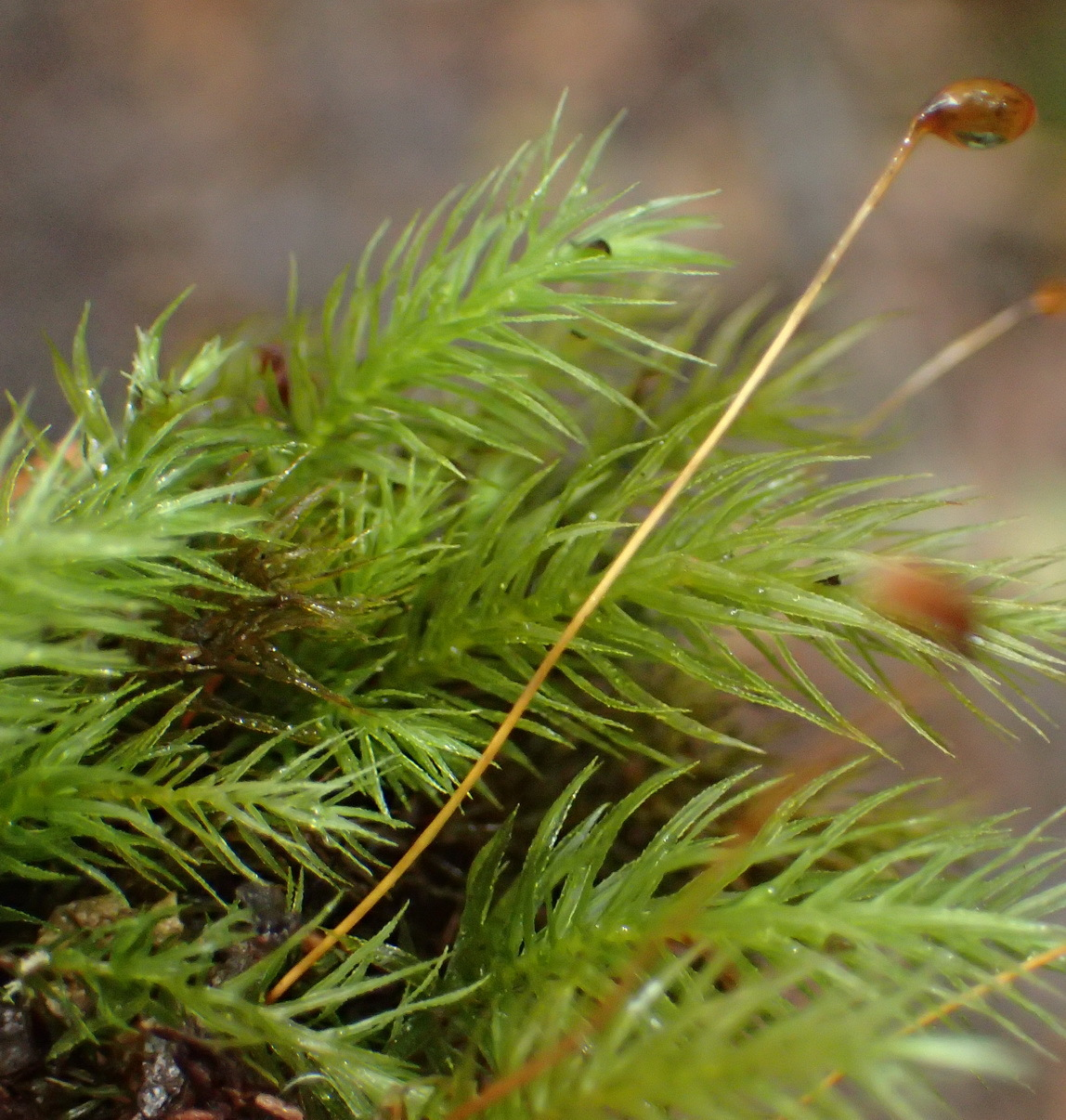
- Pyrrhobryum spiniforme

Scientific classification
- Kingdom: Plantae
- Clade: Embryophytes
- Division: Bryophyta
- Class: Bryopsida
- Subclass: Bryidae
- Order: Rhizogoniales
- Family: Rhizogoniaceae
- Genus: Pyrrhobryum; Mitt.

= Pyrrhobryum =

Genus of mosses

Pyrrhobryum is a genus of mosses belonging to the family Rhizogoniaceae.

The species of this genus are found in Southern Hemisphere.

Species:

- Pyrrhobryum dozyanum (Sande Lac.) Manuel
- Pyrrhobryum latifolium (Bosch & Sande Lac.) Mitt.
- Pyrrhobryum mauritianum (Hampe ex Besch.) Manuel
- Pyrrhobryum medium (Besch.) Manuel
- Pyrrhobryum novae-caledoniae (Besch.) Manuel
- Pyrrhobryum paramattense (Müll.Hal.) Manuel
- Pyrrhobryum pungens (Sull.) Mitt.
- Pyrrhobryum setosum Mitt.
- Pyrrhobryum spiniforme (Hedw.) Mitt.
