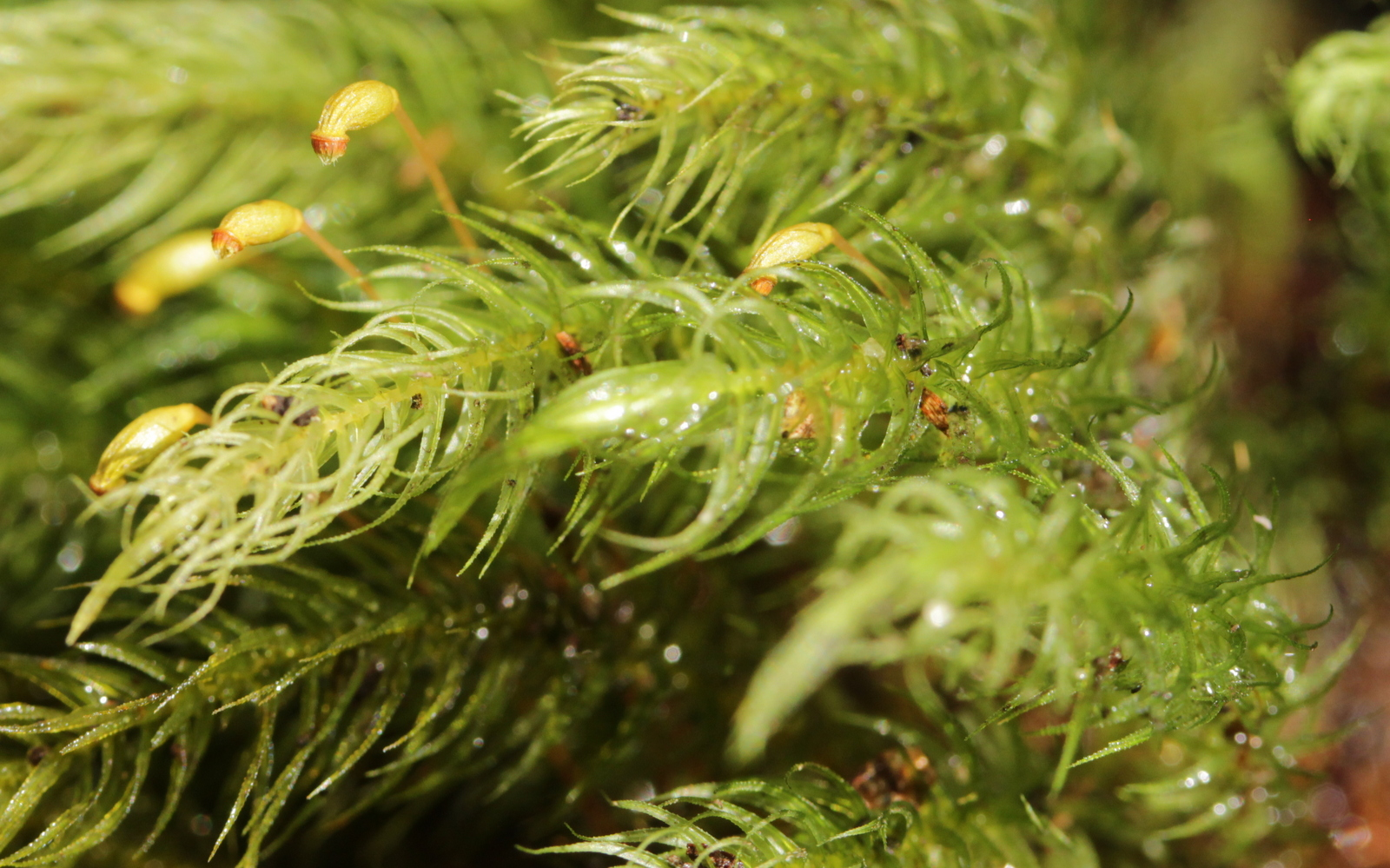
- Moss at Ferndale Park, Sydney, Australia

Scientific classification
- Kingdom: Plantae
- Clade: Embryophytes
- Division: Bryophyta
- Class: Bryopsida
- Subclass: Bryidae
- Order: Rhizogoniales
- Family: Rhizogoniaceae
- Genus: Pyrrhobryum
- Species: P. paramattense

Binomial name
- Pyrrhobryum paramattense (Müll.Hal.)

Synonyms
- Mnium paramattense Müll.Hal.; Rhizogonium paramattense (Müll.Hal.)

= Pyrrhobryum paramattense =

Species of moss

Pyrrhobryum paramattense is a moss found in very moist situations in Australia, Norfolk Island and New Zealand. Parramatta Moss is a large and luxuriant species, often seen in rainforests. Described from a sample collected near Parramatta.
