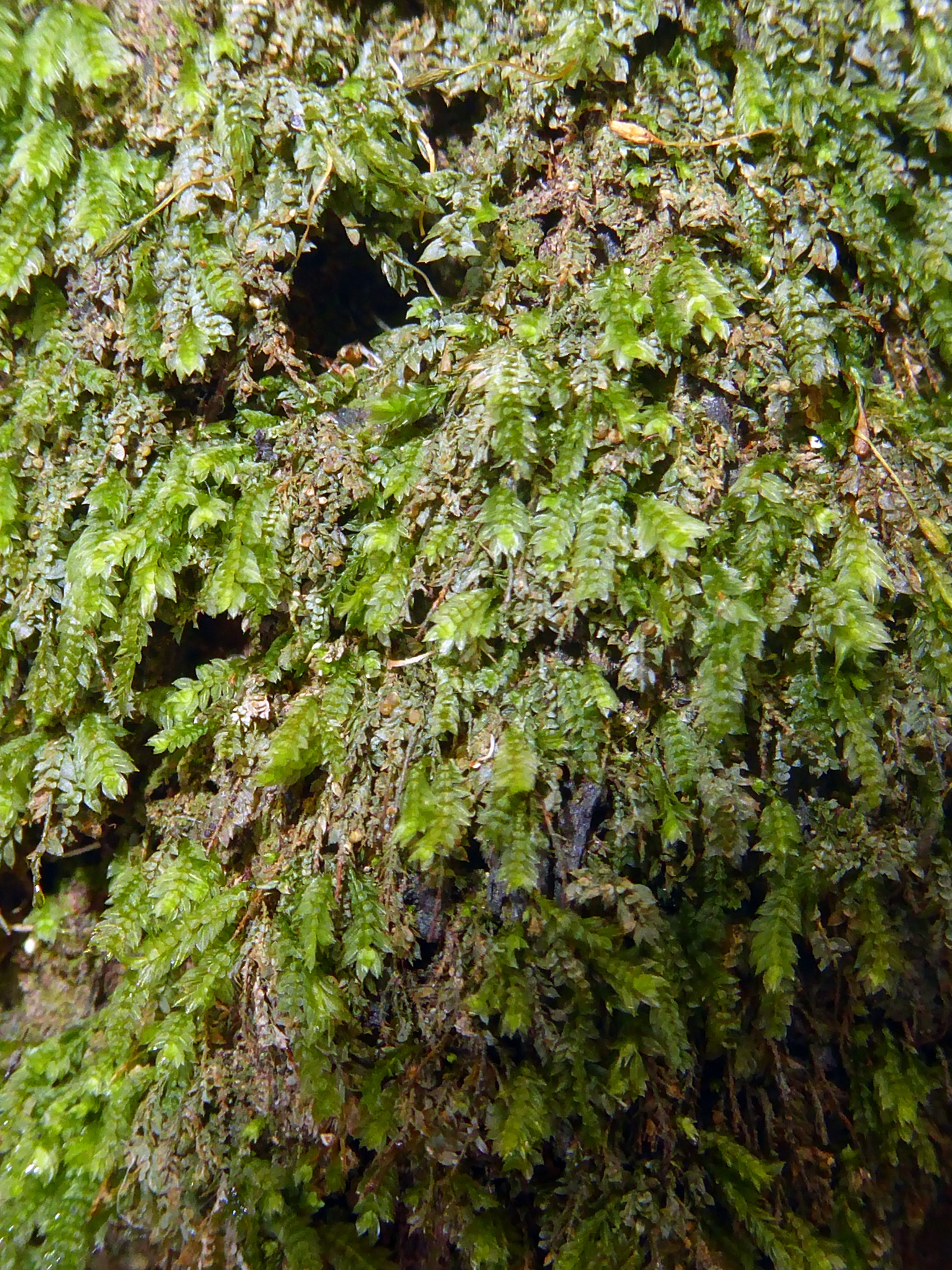
- Calomnion complanatum

Scientific classification
- Kingdom: Plantae
- Division: Bryophyta
- Class: Bryopsida
- Subclass: Bryidae
- Order: Rhizogoniales
- Family: Rhizogoniaceae
- Genus: Calomnion; Hook.f. & Wilson

= Calomnion =

Genus of mosses

Calomnion is a genus of mosses in the family Rhizogoniaceae. They have been reported from Australia, New Zealand, Polynesia, Melanesia, New Guinea, and eastern Indonesia.

== Classification ==
The genus was originally placed within its own family, the Calomniaceae, with the genus Nadeaudia. Nadeudia contained one species, Nadeaudia schistostegiella, which is now considered a synonym for Calomnion schistostegiellum.

Species included in the genus are:

- Calomnion brownseyi Vitt & H.A. Mill.
- Calomnion ceramense Vitt
- Calomnion complanatum (Hook. f. & Wilson) Lindb. (type species)
- Calomnion denticulatum Mitt.
- Calomnion iwatsukii Vitt
- Calomnion lillianiae Vitt & H.A. Mill.
- Calomnion melanesicum H.A. Mill.
- Calomnion milleri Vitt
- Calomnion schistostegiellum (Besch.) Wijk & Margad.
