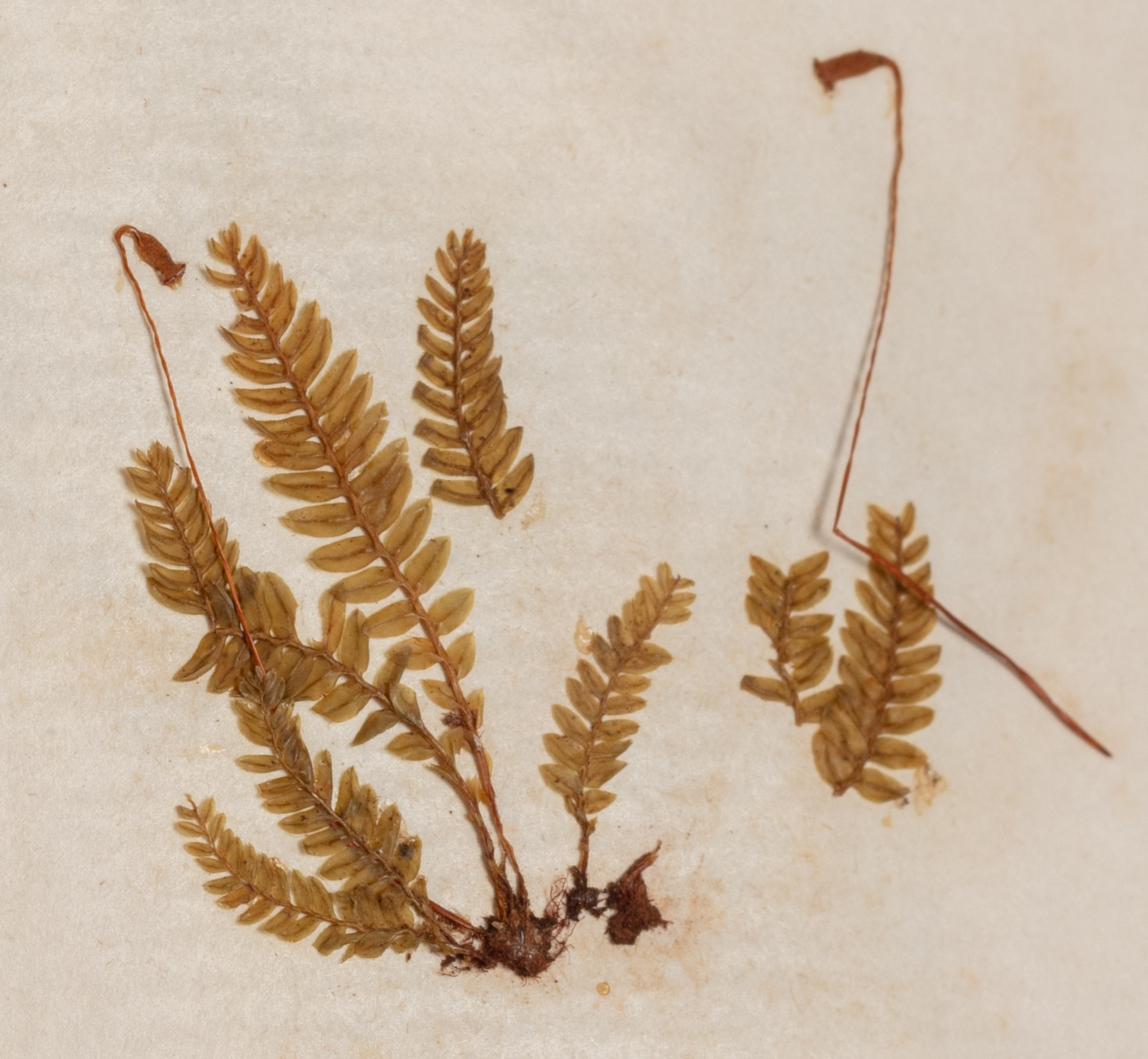
- Rhizogonium distichum

Scientific classification
- Kingdom: Plantae
- Division: Bryophyta
- Class: Bryopsida
- Subclass: Bryidae
- Order: Rhizogoniales
- Family: Rhizogoniaceae
- Genus: Rhizogonium; Brid.

= Rhizogonium =

Genus of mosses

Rhizogonium is a genus of mosses belonging to the family Rhizogoniaceae.

The genus has an almost cosmopolitan distribution.

Species:

- Rhizogonium alpestre Müll.Hal.
- Rhizogonium bifarium (Hook.) Schimp.
- Rhizogonium distichum (Sw.) Brid.
- Rhizogonium dozyanum Sande Lac.
- Rhizogonium graeffeanum (Müll.Hal.) A.Jaeger
- Rhizogonium hattorii Nog.
- Rhizogonium hookeri (Müll.Hal.) Mitt.
- Rhizogonium lamii Reimers
- Rhizogonium latifolium Bosch & Sande Lac.
- Rhizogonium lindigii (Hampe) Mitt.
- Rhizogonium longiflorum (Mitt.) A.Jaeger
- Rhizogonium mauritianum Hampe ex Besch.
- Rhizogonium medium Besch.
- Rhizogonium menziesii (Hook.) A.Jaeger
- Rhizogonium microphyllum (Dozy & Molk.) A.Jaeger
- Rhizogonium mikawaense Takaki
- Rhizogonium mnioides (Hook.) Wilson
- Rhizogonium novae-hollandiae (Brid.) Brid.
- Rhizogonium paramattense (Müll.Hal.) Reichardt
- Rhizogonium pellucidum (Mitt.) A.Jaeger
- Rhizogonium pennatum Hook.f. & Wilson
- Rhizogonium piliferum (Hook.f. & Wilson) Hook.f. & Wilson
- Rhizogonium pungens Sull.
- Rhizogonium radiatum (Wilson) A.Jaeger
- Rhizogonium setosum (Mitt.) Mitt.
- Rhizogonium spiniforme (Hedw.) Bruch
- Rhizogonium spininervium (Hook.) Schimp.
- Rhizogonium subbasilare (Hook.) Schimp.
- Rhizogonium undulatum (Lindb.) A.Jaeger
- Rhizogonium vallis-gratiae (Hampe ex Müll.Hal.) Hampe
- Rhizogonium venustum (Mitt.) A.Jaeger
