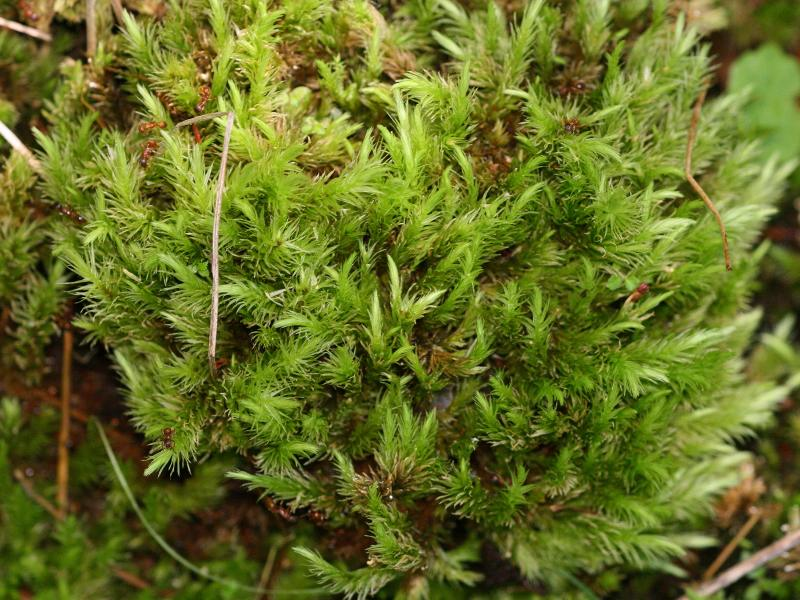

Scientific classification
- Kingdom: Plantae
- Division: Bryophyta
- Class: Bryopsida
- Subclass: Bryidae
- Order: Rhizogoniales
- Family: Aulacomniaceae
- Genus: Aulacomnium
- Species: A. palustre

Binomial name
- Aulacomnium palustre (Hedw.) Schwägr.

= Aulacomnium palustre =

Species of moss

Aulacomnium palustre, the bog groove-moss or ribbed bog moss, is a moss that is nearly cosmopolitan in distribution. It occurs in North America, Hispaniola, Venezuela, Eurasia, and New Zealand. In North America, it occurs across southern arctic, subboreal, and boreal regions from Alaska and British Columbia to Greenland and Quebec. Documentation of ribbed bog moss's distribution in the contiguous United States is probably incomplete. It is reported sporadically south to Washington, Wyoming, Georgia, and Virginia.

== Habitat types and plant communities ==
Ribbed bog moss is frequent in arctic to subboreal wetlands. Moss assemblages are typically diverse in northern (arctic, subarctic, and boreal) plant communities, and individual moss species often have low cover and/or frequency. Moss species with coverages of 2% to 4% can be common to dominant in boreal communities, although ribbed bog moss attains coverages as great as 40% in some boreal communities.

Ribbed bog moss grows in open and forested wetland communities. In unforested northern communities, ribbed bog moss is found in sedge (Carex spp.) meadows, sphagnum (Sphagnum spp.) peatlands, heath-sedge fens, and willow (Salix spp.)-dominated fens. In forests, ribbed bog moss grows in the ground layer of boreal and subboreal white spruce (Picea glauca), black spruce (P. mariana), mixed spruce-tamarack (Larix laricina), and jack pine (Pinus banksiana) fens and bogs of Alaska, Minnesota, and Canada and in boreal spruce-birch (Betula spp.) forests of Alaska and northwestern Canada. Mosses are abundant in taiga forests of interior Alaska and Canada, forming characteristic strata in nearly every taiga forest type.

Less is known of ribbed bog moss associations south and east of Minnesota, although ribbed bog moss has been noted in some swamp, coniferous and/or hardwood bog, and grassland communities. Ribbed bog moss grows in red maple (Acer rubrum) swamps of Long Island, New York, and Little listed ribbed bog moss as common (1-4% frequency) in Atlantic white-cedar (Chamaecyparis thyoides) swamps of southern New Jersey. Ribbed bog moss is also common in jack pine, aspen (Populus spp.), and mixed-hardwood forests of the Great Lakes states and southern Canada. Ribbed bog moss grows on tallgrass prairie in Kansas and Arkansas. In the Pacific Northwest ribbed bog moss occurs in alpine, subalpine, wet and dry coniferous forest, and open peatland communities. In a survey of alpine and unforested subalpine communities of the North Cascade Range in Washington and British Columbia, ribbed bog moss occurred in graminoid, forb, heath, and willow communities.

== General botanical characteristics ==
Mosses have 2 phases in their life cycle: the gametophyte (n) and sporophyte (2n) generations. Each generation is morphologically distinct.

=== Gametophytes ===
Ribbed bog moss stems comprise most of ribbed bog moss's biomass and are easily visible. Stems are erect and spreading in habit, forming clumps or lawns. They range from 1 to 4 inches (2.5 to 10.2 centimetres) long; most stems are vegetative but some bear reproductive organs. Short vegetative stems may end in a stalk-bearing clusters of gemmae. Ribbed bog moss is heterothallic, with male and female reproductive organs borne on separate reproductive shoots. Male and female stems develop antheridia and archegonia, respectively, at their tips. Approximately the top 0.6 inches (1.5 cm) of both vegetative and reproductive stems is alive; lower stem tissue is usually dead. Ribbed bog moss leaves are bright yellowish-green to green; their bright color sometimes gives ribbed bog moss an incandescent appearance ("glow moss"). Bright leaves that contrast starkly with the reddish-brown stems typically make ribbed bog moss the most conspicuous species in moss assemblages. The leaves are lanceolate in shape and often tomentose, becoming twisted and brown when dry. They range from 3 to 5 mm long. Ribbed bog moss anchors to the substrate with rhizoids. Because ribbed bog moss lacks vascular tissue, water uptake occurs by osmosis and capillary action. A network of capillary spaces between stems and rhizoids enhances water uptake; ribbed bog moss usually absorbs water more efficiently than associated sphagnum mosses.

=== Sporophytes ===
Sporophytes grow out of archegonia. The sporophyte consists of a foot that anchors the sporophyte to the archegonia, a stalk, and a spore capsule. Ribbed bog moss stalks are vertically straight and about 1.8 inches (4.6 cm) long. Ribbed bog moss is named for its distinct spore capsule, which is strongly ribbed, cylindrical, and about 4 mm long. The capsule is capped with a calyptra.

=== Regeneration processes ===
Ribbed bog moss regenerates sexually and vegetatively.

==== Gametophyte dispersal and establishment ====
A spore is the first growth stage of a developing gametophyte. When the spore capsule matures, ribbed bog moss's calyptra splits along the side, exposing spores. Release of the exposed spores requires dry weather and is governed by a row of "teeth" that ring the capsule's top. The capsule teeth are hygroscopic, bending outward when air is dry and permitting spores to fall. Wind disperses ribbed bog moss spores long distances by shaking the capsule. When air is moist, the teeth bend inward, holding the spores within the capsule. The spores require a moist substrate to germinate. A germinated spore develops into a protonema (a branched, threadlike structure). Rhizoids grow down from the protonema and penetrate the substrate. Stems arise from buds that develop on the protonema surface. As stems grow, they develop their own rhizoids and become independent of the protonema. Mature male and female stems develop antheridia and archegonia, which produce sperm and eggs, respectively. Ribbed bog moss antheridia do not develop synchronously on the same stem. Mature and immature antheridia are intermixed on individual male shoots; therefore, sperm cells on the same stem do not all develop at the same time. However, sperm cells within a single antheridium have synchronous development. Fertilization requires a moist or saturated environment. Before fertilization, the antheridium absorbs water and swells, forcing the spore cap off. Rain may splash sperm into the archegonium, or sperm may swim to the archegonium.

==== Spore banking ====
Ribbed bog moss may germinate from spores stored in the substrate, but banked spores are probably less important to ribbed bog moss regeneration than freshly dispersed spores. Ross-Davis and Frego found that annual dispersal deposited a far greater number of moss spores on boreal substrates compared to the number of spores buried in the spore bank.

==== Breeding system ====
Ribbed bog moss is dioecious.

==== Sporophyte development ====
Ribbed bog moss's sporophyte generation develops from the fertilized egg. Eggs are fertilized within the archegonium. The sporophyte embryo grows rapidly, differentiating into foot, stalk, and capsule tissue. Spores develop within the capsule.

==== Vegetative regeneration ====
Ribbed bog moss reproduces asexually from specialized gametophyte tissues and from plant breakage. It reproduces frequently from gemmae. Ribbed bog moss may also regenerate when paraphyses (minute filaments arising from ribbed bog moss's antheridia) detach. In the laboratory, 12.5% of detached ribbed bog moss paraphyses developed into propagules. Ribbed bog moss establishes readily when chunks of ribbed bog moss shoots are moved to new sites by soil movement or transplanting. Ribbed bog moss is apparently competitive in its ability to establish from stem chunks. In a laboratory experiment, ribbed bog moss that was collected from an Alberta peatland, shredded, and placed on a peat substrate showed greatest frequency (100%) of 4 moss species so treated. Ribbed bog moss also showed fastest growth relative to the other mosses throughout the 125-day experiment.

==== Growth ====
Ribbed bog moss growth is robust. It showed a "tall and dense growth habit" in a greenhouse common garden; ribbed bog moss, juniper hair cap moss (Polytrichum juniperinum), and papillose sphagnum (S. papillosum) crowded out 3 other moss species. Dry climate slows or stops ribbed bog moss growth. On the Boreal Ecosystem Research and Monitoring Sites study area in Saskatchewan, ribbed bog moss had a negative mean annual growth rate in a drought year (2003). Mean annual growth rate in a wet year (2004) was 2.7 mm. Ribbed bog moss was sensitive to saturated conditions in the wet year; stem lengths were greatest on relatively drier microsites, and ribbed bog moss growth rate increased slightly with increasing depth to the water table.

=== Site characteristics ===
Ribbed bog moss is a habitat generalist. It was, for example, 1 of 6 mosses having broad ecological amplitude in a survey of bryophyte habitats on peatlands across Alberta's Mackenzie River basin. Ribbed bog moss tolerates a wide range of moisture levels, substrates, nutrient loads, terrain, and climates.

==== Moisture regime ====
Ribbed bog moss generally grows on wetlands including fens, bogs, marshes, pond margins, streambanks, wet meadows, and riparian shrublands. In subalpine fir forests of central Idaho, ribbed bog moss occurs on seeps and springs that remain moist throughout the fire season. Ribbed bog moss is an indicator species of wet to very wet soils in Canada. In northern British Columbia, ribbed bog moss is an indicator species of undisturbed wet conifer sites. The white spruce/field horsetail/ribbed bog moss association occurs on the wettest white spruce forests in subboreal British Columbia; the water table is near the soil surface for most of the growing season. In a geothermal meadow in Haida Gwaii, British Columbia, ribbed bog moss occurred on sites with high local humidity (31-66%) due to nearby thermal pools. Ribbed bog moss did not grow on dry sites, although drained microsites may favor ribbed bog moss growth on otherwise saturated substrates. Ribbed bog moss does not tolerate salt spray, which prevents its establishment on coastal dunelands.

Ribbed bog moss is not confined to wet sites in all areas. Some forests with ribbed bog moss dry in late summer, and ribbed bog moss grows on relatively xeric hummock mounds on bogs in Birds Hill Provincial Park, Manitoba. Ribbed bog moss occupies both dry and wet sites on the Boreal Ecosystem Research and Monitoring Sites study area. It dominates relatively dry, shaded microsites in the area; the water table is 20 to 26 inches (51 to 66 centimetres) below ground, and there is 30% to 60% black spruce and/or tamarack cover.

==== Substrates ====
Ribbed bog moss is primarily a ground-layer species, but it does not require a particular substrate to establish and grow. It is most common on peat but also grows on thinner organic soils and other substrates. Ribbed bog moss frequently grows on peat overlying permafrost in Alaska and northern Canada. On northern peatlands, the peat layer generally ranges from 38 to 102 inches (97 to 259 centimetres) thick, and organic content of the soil layer is high. Studies on peatlands in Quebec showed ribbed bog moss "preferred sites with high organic matter depth" (P<0.01). Ribbed bog moss grows on organic surface layers overlying varying soil textures. Ribbed bog moss also grows on burned substrates including ash, mineral soil, scorched organic soil, scorched peat, and scorched downed woody debris.

Ribbed bog moss grows on peat and other organic soil layers more often than on downed bark or wood, but is reported growing on woody debris or other dead wood in a few locations. In northern British Columbia, ribbed bog moss substrates included disturbed forest floors, logs, and stumps at 44%, 13%, and 3% frequencies, respectively. Ribbed bog moss was found on downed woody debris in a mixed quaking aspen-paper birch-balsam fir (Populus tremuloides-Betula papyrifera-Abies balsamifera) forest in east-central Alberta and on stumps in a mixed-hardwood forest in Wisconsin. Ribbed bog moss rarely grows on standing live or dead wood.

Ribbed bog moss showed broad substrate tolerances in a greenhouse common pot study in Scotland. Ribbed bog moss vegetative propagules were sown with propagules of 6 other mosses to test substrate preferences. After 1 year, ribbed bog moss abundance was similar on heather (Calluna vulgaris) litter, European white birch (Betula pendula) litter, dead shrub litter, Scots pine (Pinus sylvestris) needles, sand, and sphagnum peat substrates. To test particle-size microsite preferences on peat substrates, the peat was broken into various fragment sizes from minute to large (<0.25 inch to >2 inches (0.63–5 cm)). Ribbed bog moss grew on peat of all particle sizes but was most frequent on small (0.5–1 inch (1.3–2.5 centimetres)) peat particles.

==== Water and substrate chemistry ====
The pH of water, peat, and/or soil is usually acidic to neutral in mires with ribbed bog moss, although ribbed bog moss tolerates mildly alkaline conditions. For example, ribbed bog moss grows in extremely acidic peatlands overlying permafrost in spruce taiga of Alaska but also grows in calcareous bogs in Birds Hill Provincial Park. In Minnesota, ribbed bog moss is reported from bogs ranging from 5.0 to 7.3 in pH. A survey of bryophytes on peatlands across Alberta's Mackenzie River basin found ribbed bog moss was abundant on sites ranging from 4.5 to 7.5 in pH.

Mires are classified on pH and mineral gradients from extreme-poor (very strongly acid and low in calcium and magnesium) to extreme-rich (neutral to alkaline and high in calcium and magnesium). Fens are richer than bogs. Ribbed bog moss occurs in poor and rich mires. On mires across British Columbia and Alberta, ribbed bog moss grows in mires with broad ranges of water pH and electrical conductivity, but is most common on strongly acidic peatlands (water pH <5.5) with moderate calcium and magnesium levels (<200 μS/cm**). Ribbed bog moss also grows in moderate-rich fens with higher pH and electrical conductivity values. In a peat-core study in central Alberta, macrofossil ribbed bog moss was an indicator species of moderate-rich fens; ribbed bog moss occurred most often on mires that were moderately acidic (x pH=6.0) and had low electrical conductivity (x=125 μS/cm) and moderately high water tables (x= 8.7 inches (22 cm) deep). In a study of alpine mires in Italy, ribbed bog moss was intermediate in mire pH and mineral content compared to associated nonvascular and vascular plant species, occurring on both poor and rich mires. All associated mosses had narrower pH and mineral tolerances than ribbed bog moss. Gignac provides information on ribbed bog moss habitats in British Columbia and Alberta including ranges in pH, electrical conductivity, relative depth to the water table, and relative overstory cover.

==== Nutrients ====
Field observations and laboratory experiments suggest that ribbed bog moss has broad tolerance and may be relatively insensitive to macronutrient concentrations. On the Svalbard archipelago in Norway, ribbed bog moss grows on small "bird islands" where eiders, Arctic terns, and other migratory birds nest offshore of the main island, Spitsbergen. Nitrogen levels on the bird islands are very high. On Spitsbergen Island, however, ribbed bog moss grows on dry hummocks and moist hummock edges, both of which have low nitrogen levels but probably provide moisture levels that favor ribbed bog moss. In a laboratory experiment, nitrogen fertilizer initially slowed ribbed bog moss growth rate, but growth rates of ribbed bog moss with and without nitrogen were similar at the end of 125 days. Addition of phosphorus had no effect on ribbed bog moss growth.

Ribbed bog moss is listed as an indicator species of nitrogen-medium soils in British Columbia.

==== Landscape ====
Tundra and taiga areas where ribbed bog moss grows are generally flat to gently sloped, but local relief creates drainage patterns that often result in distinct moss assemblages. Site geology, including topography, bedrock composition, catchment hydrology, and basin bathymetry, affects wetland drainage and partially controls rates of transition from open water to bog. Ribbed bog moss is common on hummocks, which tend to dry out faster than adjacent lowlands. In British Columbia and Alberta, ribbed bog moss often dominates hummock tops that are surrounded by sphagnum peatlands. Although ribbed bog moss generally attains greatest coverage on hummock tops, it sometimes forms lawns and strings in low areas. In Labrador, tufted bulrush-mountain fly honeysuckle/ribbed bog moss associations occur on low strings of consolidated peat and on elevated peatlands. The low strings lie 38 to 76 inches (97 to 193 centimetres) above the water table and lack erosion patterns.

In Kluane National Park, Yukon, the white spruce/ribbed bog moss forest community occurs on poorly drained east- and north-facing slopes.

===== Elevation =====
There are few reports of ribbed bog moss's elevational tolerances. Ribbed bog moss is reported from 1,600 to 5,700 feet (490 to 1,740 m) in west-central Alberta and at 827 feet (252 m) in Kosciucko County, Indiana. In subalpine and alpine communities of the North Cascade Range in Washington and British Columbia, ribbed bog moss occurs on high-elevation (>7,380 feet (2,250 m)) sites that remain snow-free most of the year.

==== Climate ====
Ribbed bog moss occurs in arctic, subarctic, boreal, and subboreal zones with cold meso-thermal, oceanic, continental, or cold-humid climates. It is more common in arctic, subarctic, and boreal than subboreal zones. A survey of bryophytes on peatlands across Alberta's Mackenzie River basin found optimal ribbed bog moss growth occurred on sites with annual temperatures ranging from 20 to 32 °F (−7 to 0 °C). In interior arctic, subarctic, and boreal zones, climate is strongly continental in the west, becoming more humid to the east. Climate shift from continental to humid generally occurs near Hudson Bay and Lake Superior. In a study of moss habitats across British Columbia, Alberta, and Manitoba, ribbed bog moss was an indicator species for continentality of climate: it was the only moss common to all continental peatlands surveyed. On sites from coastal British Columbia to central Alberta, ribbed bog moss was most common on subcontinental sites (intermediate between coastal and continental climates). Ribbed bog moss was intermediate on gradients ranking breadth of moss habitat niches. Climate factors evaluated included length of growing season, amount of precipitation during the growing season, temperature, and aridity. Feather mosses (Hylocomiaceae) and sphagnum mosses generally had wider niches and dominated more sites than ribbed bog moss. Ribbed bog moss's rarity on all but cold sites in the lower 48 states suggests that ribbed bog moss does not tolerate long periods of warm weather. In a geothermal meadow on Queen Charlotte Island, British Columbia, ribbed bog moss was absent from sites where nearby thermal pools raised local soil temperatures above 86 °F (30 °C).

== Uses ==
=== Importance to wildlife and livestock ===
Ribbed bog moss provides few known direct benefits to wildlife or livestock. Mosses in general are low in carbohydrates, proteins, and fats compared to vascular plants, and animals seldom graze them. Caribou may eat mosses when little other forage is available. Wildlife seeking cover probably avoid open areas dominated by ribbed bog moss or other low vegetation. In Wood Buffalo National Park, Alberta, aerial photos identified areas dominated by ribbed bog moss, bog Labrador tea, and/or Bebb willow as indicators of nonnesting habitat for whooping cranes.

American robins at the Mountain Lake Biological Station, Virginia, used ribbed bog moss as nest material.

Northern mires provide habitat for a variety of invertebrates including worms, crustaceans, arachnids, and insects, particularly mosquitoes, midges, and other flies.

=== Value for rehabilitation of disturbed sites ===
Chunks from ribbed bog moss lawns can be transplanted onto disturbed sites. In Minnesota, moss plugs used in restoration projects on old peat mines are harvested from nearby unmined sites in spring, before the ground thaws. Although ribbed bog moss is not often used for restoration, it could be a valuable addition to restoration projects. Foote classified ribbed bog moss communities along the Alaskan Highway in Yukon as having "high site sensitivity", with moderate potential for erosion. Black spruce/ribbed bog moss communities on the Alaskan Pipeline are rated "sensitive to highly sensitive" to erosion and disturbance.
