= Karl Müller (bryologist) =

German bryologist (1818–1899)

- Born: December 16, 1818; Allstedt, Saxony, Kingdom of Prussia, German Empire
- Died: February 9, 1899 (aged 80); Halle (Saale), Kingdom of Prussia, German Empire
- Education: University of Halle
- Scientific career
- Fields: Bryology
- Author abbrev. (botany): Müll.Hal.

Karl Johann August (Friedrich Wilhelm) Müller (16 December 1818 – 9 February 1899) was a German bryologist and science popularizer.

Prior to 1843 he worked as a pharmacist at several locations in Germany (Kranichfeld, Jever, Detmold and Blankenburg am Harz), followed by studies in botany at the University of Halle (1843 to 1846). In 1843 he became an assistant editor of Botanische Zeitung. Together with Otto Ule and Emil Adolf Rossmässler, Müller founded the Die Natur which remained for decades the flagship journal of popular science in Germany. He authored several books to reach lay audiences in his attempt to spread an aesthetically imbued image of nature. He determined the mosses of Augustus Fendler which were distributed by August Schrader in 1879 as exsiccata with the title Musci Venezuelenses, determ. C. Mueller. Legit. A. Fendler 1854-5

During his career he amassed a moss herbarium consisting of 12,000 bryological species. Pyrrhobryum parramattense is one of the many species he described. In 1898, Müller was elected a member of the Leopoldina science academy.

== Written works ==
- Synopsis muscorum frondosorum (two volumes, 1849/1851).
- Genera muscorum frondosorum (1901)., (with Karl Schliephacke).
- Antäus oder to dir Natur im Spiegel der Menschheit.
