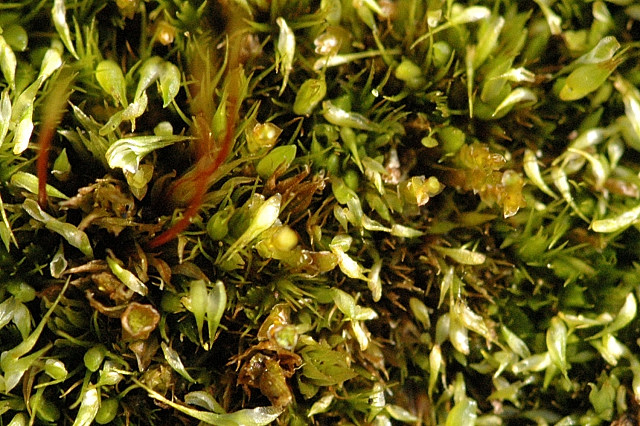
- Orthodontium lineare

Scientific classification
- Kingdom: Plantae
- Division: Bryophyta
- Class: Bryopsida
- Subclass: Bryidae
- Order: Rhizogoniales
- Family: Orthodontiaceae; Goffinet

Genera
- See Classification

= Orthodontiaceae =

Family of mosses

Orthodontiaceae is a family of mosses.

== Description ==
Species in the family are acrocarpous or pseudo-pleurocarpous mosses that are epiphytic. They are usually dioecious and have erect setae and capsules with a well-developed operculum. They are characterized as small plants growing loosely on coniferous trees, decaying coniferous wood, or in terrestrial habitats. Species are widespread in tropical and temperate regions.

== Classification ==
The placement of the family has been subject to much revision. The genus Orthodontium was elevated to family status by W. R. Buck and Goffinet (2000) and was originally associated with the Bryales. The family was elevated the order Orthodontiales by Bell et al. (2007). The family most recently is considered as part of the Rhizogoniales.

The genera represented by the order are:

- Orthodontium
- Orthodontopsis
- Hymenodon
- Leptotheca
