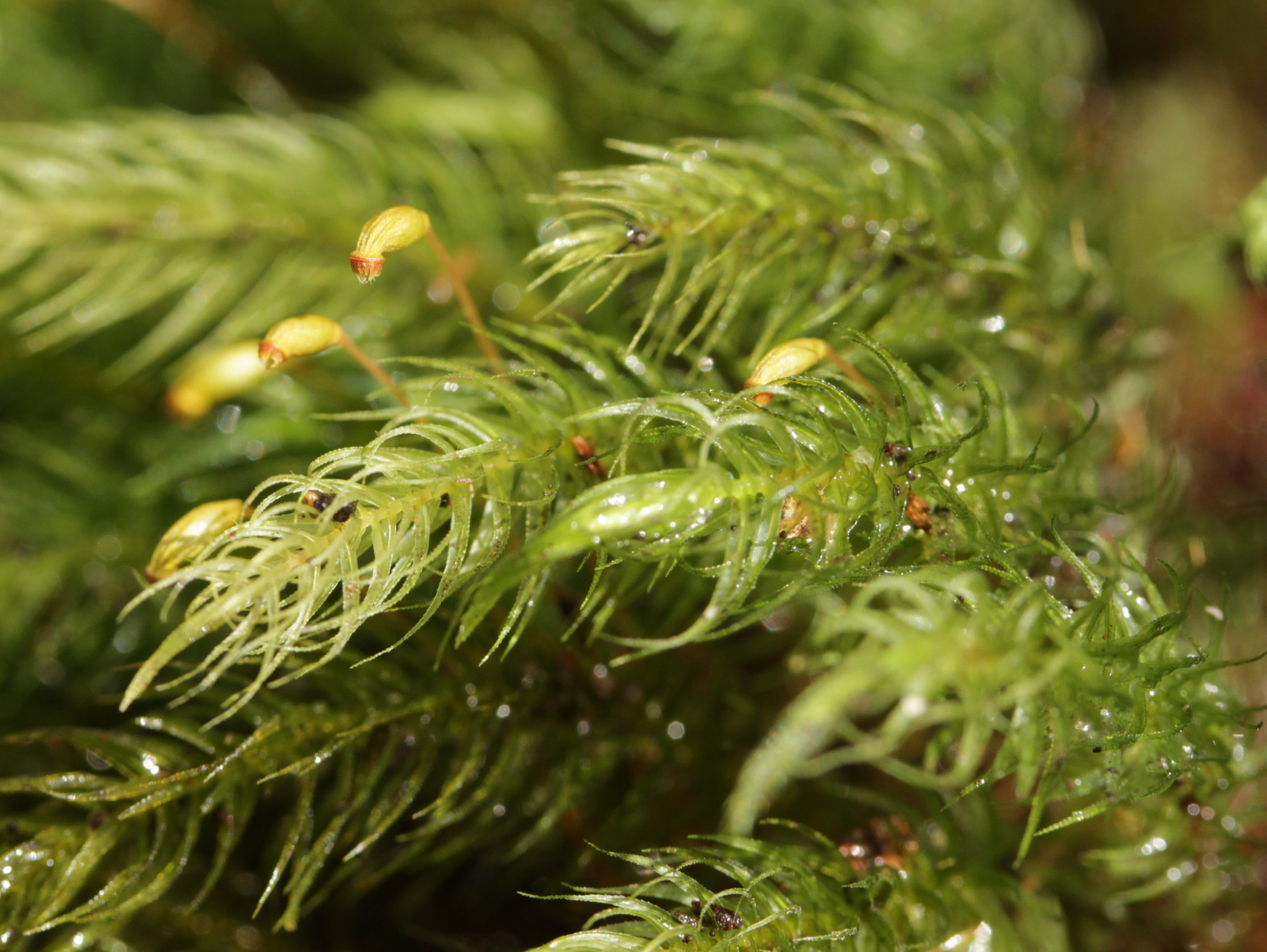
- Pyrrhobryum parramattense

Scientific classification
- Kingdom: Plantae
- Division: Bryophyta
- Class: Bryopsida
- Subclass: Bryidae
- Order: Rhizogoniales
- Family: Rhizogoniaceae; Broth.

= Rhizogoniaceae =

Family of mosses

Rhizogoniaceae is a family of mosses in the order Rhizogoniales.

The genera represented by the family are:

- Calomnion Hook.f. & Wilson
- Cryptopodium Brid.
- Goniobryum Lindb.
- Photinophyllum
- Pyrrhobryum Mitt.
- Rhizogonium Brid.
- Vetiplanaxis N.E.Bell
