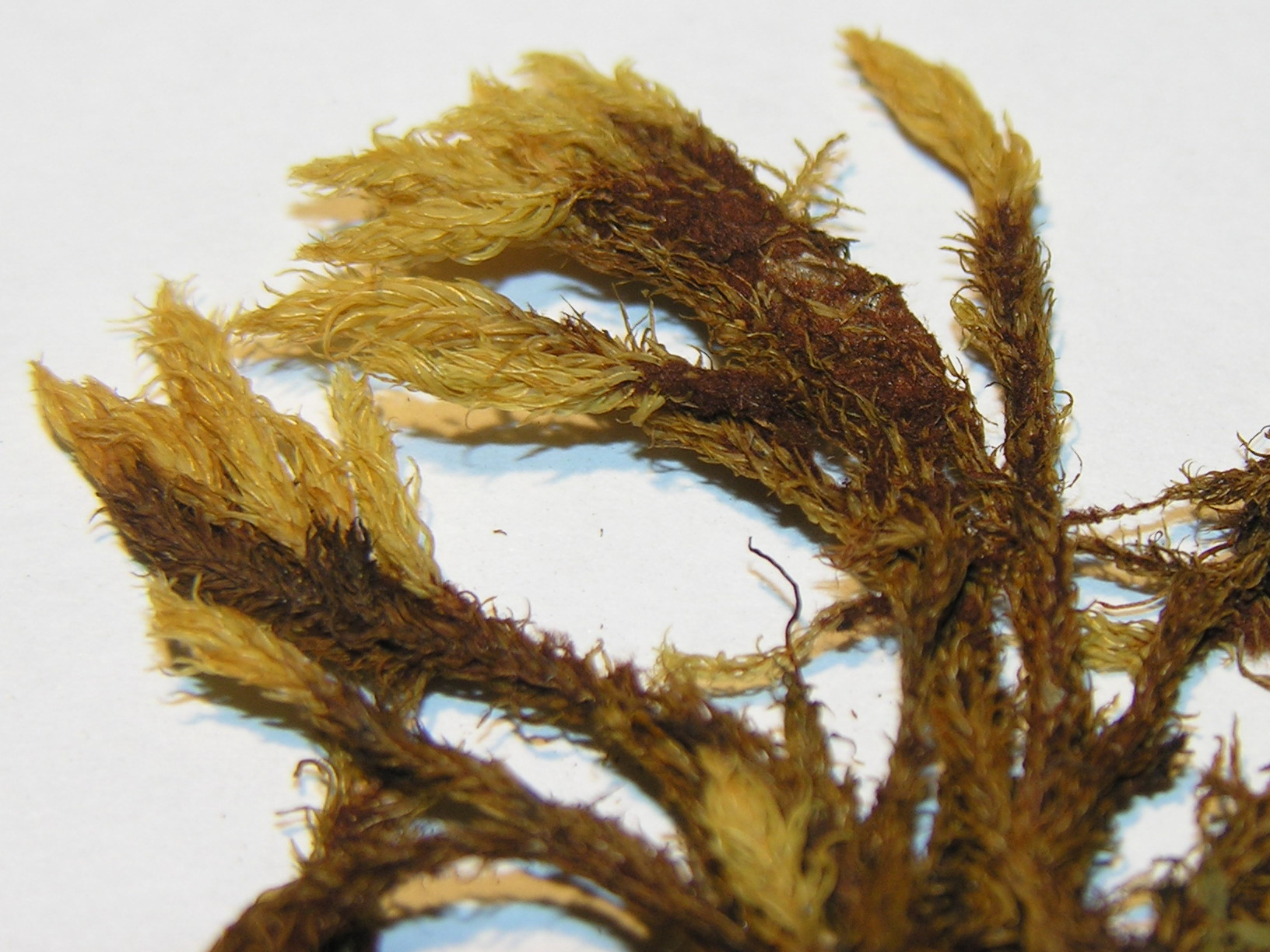
- Aulacomnium palustre

Scientific classification
- Kingdom: Plantae
- Division: Bryophyta
- Class: Bryopsida
- Subclass: Bryidae
- Order: Rhizogoniales
- Family: Aulacomniaceae; Schimp.

Genera
- See Classification

= Aulacomniaceae =

Family of mosses

Aulacomniaceae is a family of mosses.

== Description ==
Bell et al. (2007) describes members of the family:

- "Morphological traits shared by these taxa include sulcate capsules, deciduous apical leaves, undulate, oblong-ovate and asymmetrical leaves with coarsely-toothed margins, and smooth leaf cells."

== Classification ==
The placement of the family has been subject to much revision. The family was first described by Wilhelm Philippe Schimper in his 1860 publication Synopsis Muscorum Europaeorum. Bell et al. (2007) elevated the family to the order Aulacomniales. However, the Goffinet et al. (2009) classification places the family within the Rhizogoniales.

The genera represented by the order are:

- Aulacomnium
- Mesochaete
- Hymenodontopsis
