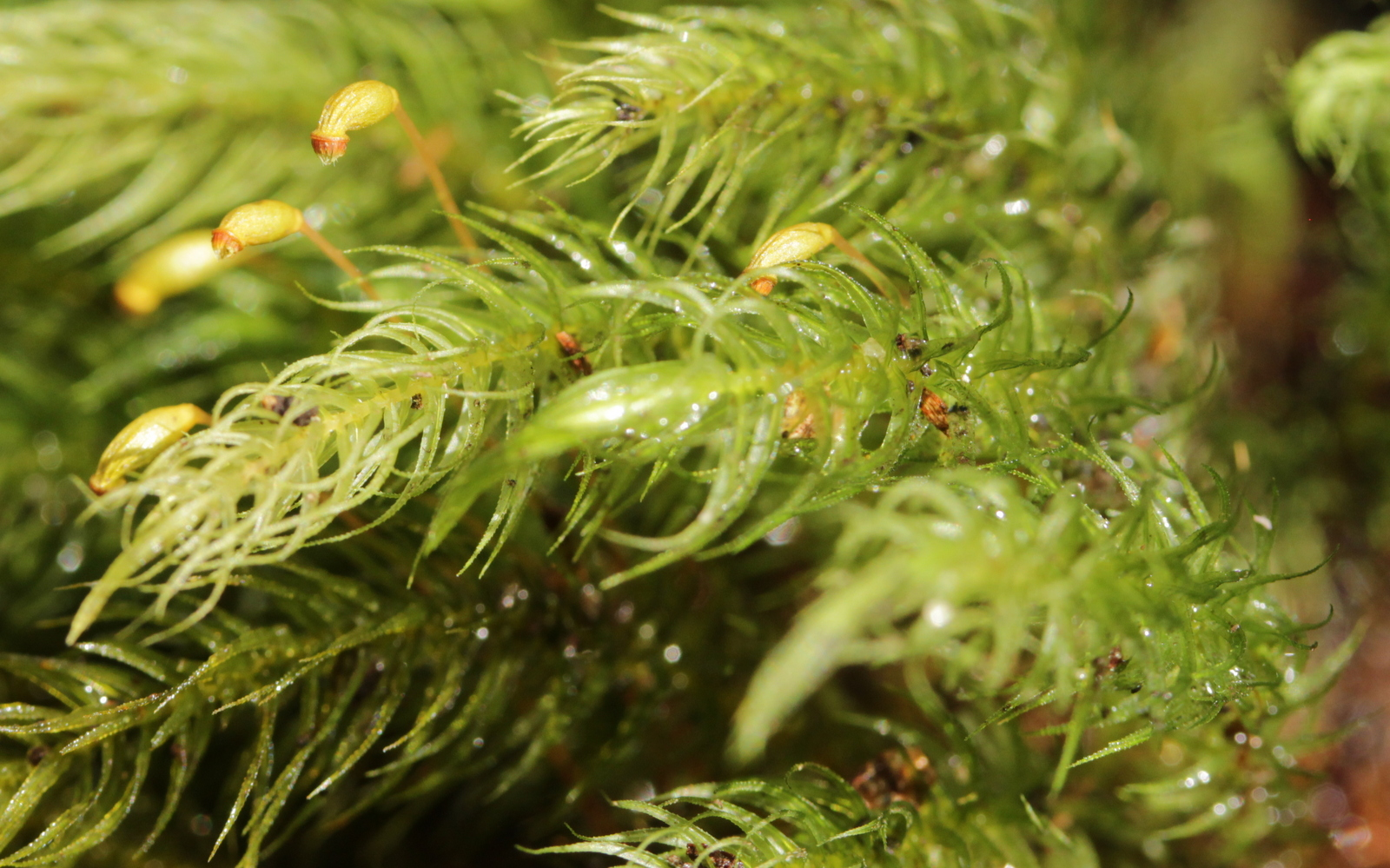
- Pyrrhobryum parramattense

Scientific classification
- Kingdom: Plantae
- Division: Bryophyta
- Class: Bryopsida
- Subclass: Bryidae
- Superorder: Bryanae
- Order: Rhizogoniales (M. Fleisch.) Goffinet & W.R. Buck

Families
- Aulacomniaceae Schimp.; Orthodontiaceae Goffinet; Rhizogoniaceae Broth.

Synonyms
- Aulacomniales (Schimp.) N.E.Bell, A.E.Newton, D.Quandt; Orthodontiales (Broth.) N.E.Bell, A.E.Newton, D.Quandt

= Rhizogoniales =

Order of mosses

Rhizogoniales is an order of mosses in the Bryopsida.

== Description ==
Most of the taxa within the order are basal-branching pleurocarps.

== Taxonomy ==
Two families are included in the order. These are the Rhizogoniaceae and Calomniaceae.

Family Calomniaceae

- Calomnion Hook. f. & Wilson
- Cryptopodium Brid.
- Pyrrhobryum Mitt.

Family Rhizogoniaceae

- Goniobryum Lindb.
- Rhizogonium Brid.
