= Bartramia nothostricta =

Scientific classification
- Kingdom: Plantae
- Clade: Embryophytes
- Division: Bryophyta
- Class: Bryopsida
- Subclass: Bryidae
- Order: Bartramiales
- Family: Bartramiaceae
- Genus: Bartramia
- Species: B. nothostricta

Binomial name
- Bartramia nothostricta Catches.

Species of moss

Bartramia nothostricta is a species of moss in the family Bartramiaceae and is endemic to the south-east of Australia. It grows in small colonies in moist places, and is recognised by its leaves which look like a shaving brush and by its bright green, spherical, lollipop-like capsules.

== Description ==
Bartramia nothostricta moss plants are 5–10 mm (0.2–0.4 in) tall and form dense clusters or "turfs" which are bright green above and brownish below. The stems have a fairly large central strand and there are only a few, dark red-brown rhizoids at the base. The leaves are erect around the stem, standing like the hairs on a shaving brush. The leaves are narrow lance-shaped, 1.5–4 mm (0.06–0.2 in) long, about 0.5 mm (0.02 in) wide, have small teeth on the edge and are constructed of two cell layers. The costa or "nerve" is strong, and more or less prominent on the lower side. The capsules are almost spherical, bright green and sit on top of a red stalk. The peristome has short yellowish teeth.

== Taxonomy and naming ==
Bartramia nothostricta was first formally described in 1987 by David Catcheside and the description was published in Memoirs of the New York Botanic Garden. The specific epithet (nothostricta) is derived from the Ancient Greek word nothos meaning "spurious", "bastard" or "false"' and the Latin word stricta meaning "straight" or "tight".

== Distribution and habitat ==
This moss species occurs in the Flinders Ranges and Southern Lofty botanical regions of South Australia and in Victoria where it grows on earth banks and near streams.
