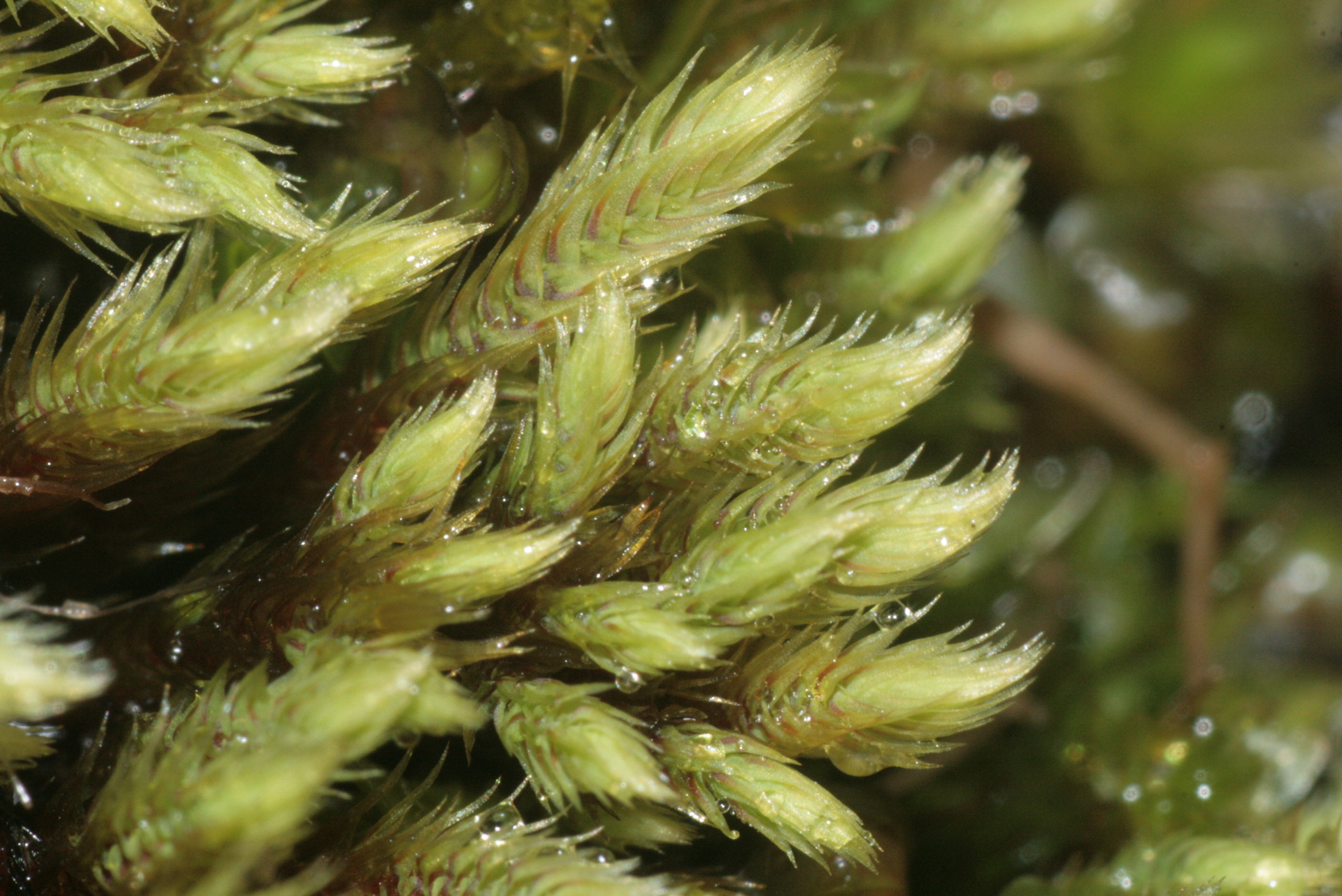

Scientific classification
- Kingdom: Plantae
- Division: Bryophyta
- Class: Bryopsida
- Subclass: Bryidae
- Order: Bartramiales
- Family: Bartramiaceae
- Genus: Philonotis
- Species: P. seriata

Binomial name
- Philonotis seriata Mitten, 1859

= Philonotis seriata =

Species of moss

Philonotis seriata is a species of moss belonging to the family Bartramiaceae. It is widely distributed in Europe but it is also found in other parts of the world.

In a study of the effect of the herbicide Asulam on moss growth, Philonotis seriata was shown to have intermediate sensitivity to Asulam exposure.
