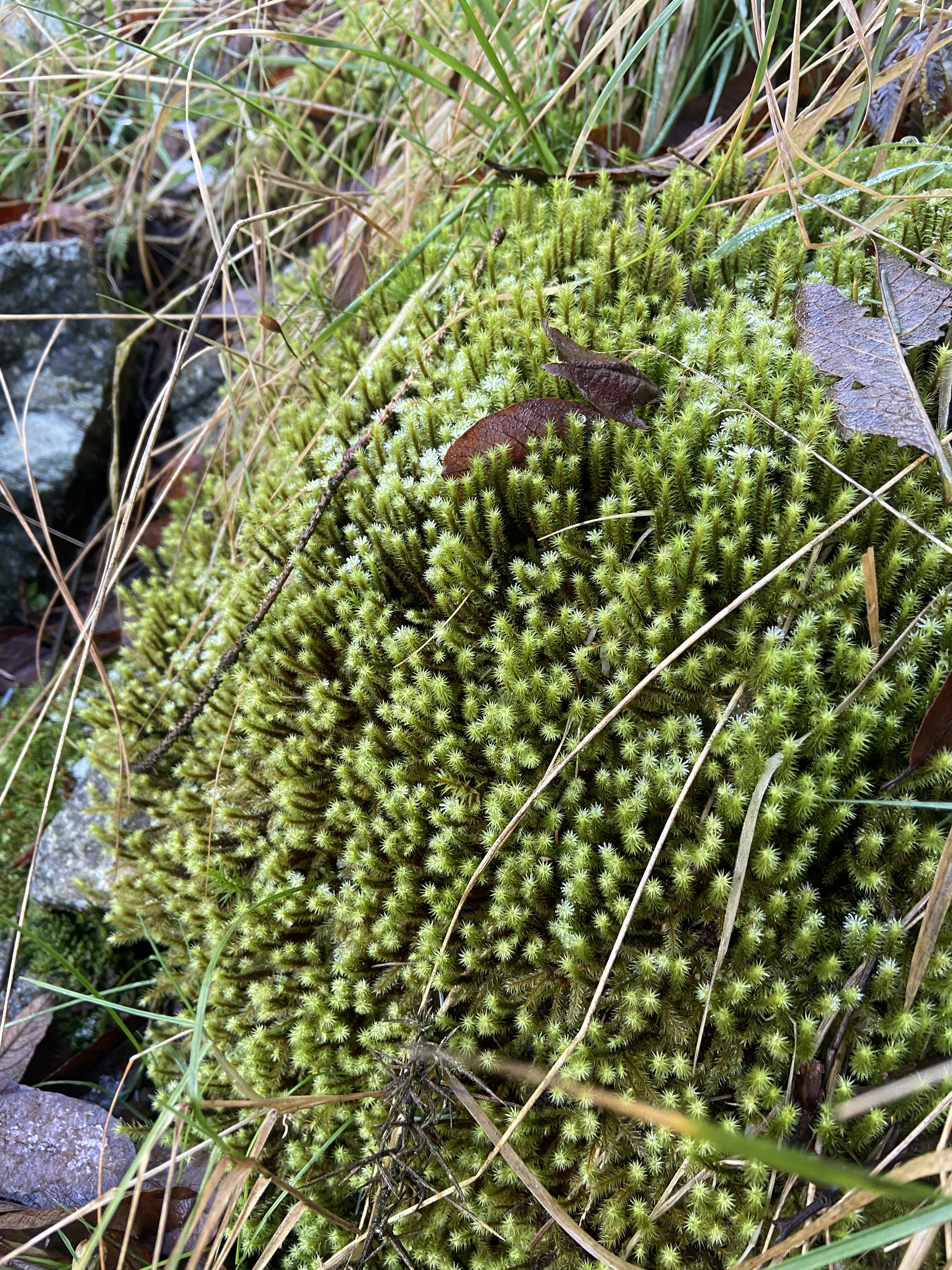
- growing among rock scree in Ireland

Conservation status
- Least Concern (IUCN 3.1)

Scientific classification
- Kingdom: Plantae
- Division: Bryophyta
- Class: Bryopsida
- Subclass: Bryidae
- Order: Bartramiales
- Family: Bartramiaceae
- Genus: Breutelia
- Species: B. chrysocoma

Binomial name
- Breutelia chrysocoma (Hedw.) Lindb.

= Breutelia chrysocoma =

Species of moss

Breutelia chrysocoma, also known as the bottle brush moss and the golden-head moss, is a species of moss in the Bartramiaceae family. It is an attractive and conspicuous moss found most commonly in the north Atlantic, with strongholds in western Britain, Ireland and western Norway. Other populations have been found across western and central Europe but far less common compared to the hyper-oceanic zone of northwest Europe. It is most commonly found on upland acidic grassland, especially near flushes.
