= Breutelia grandis =

Scientific classification
- Kingdom: Plantae
- Division: Bryophyta
- Class: Bryopsida
- Subclass: Bryidae
- Order: Bartramiales
- Family: Bartramiaceae
- Genus: Breutelia
- Species: B. grandis

Binomial name
- Breutelia grandis (Hampe) Paris, 1894

Synonyms
- Bartramia grandis Hampe; Breutelia elegans C.H. Wright; Prionodon robustus Hampe

Species of moss

Breutelia grandis is a species of moss in the family Bartramiaceae. It is found in Brazil.
