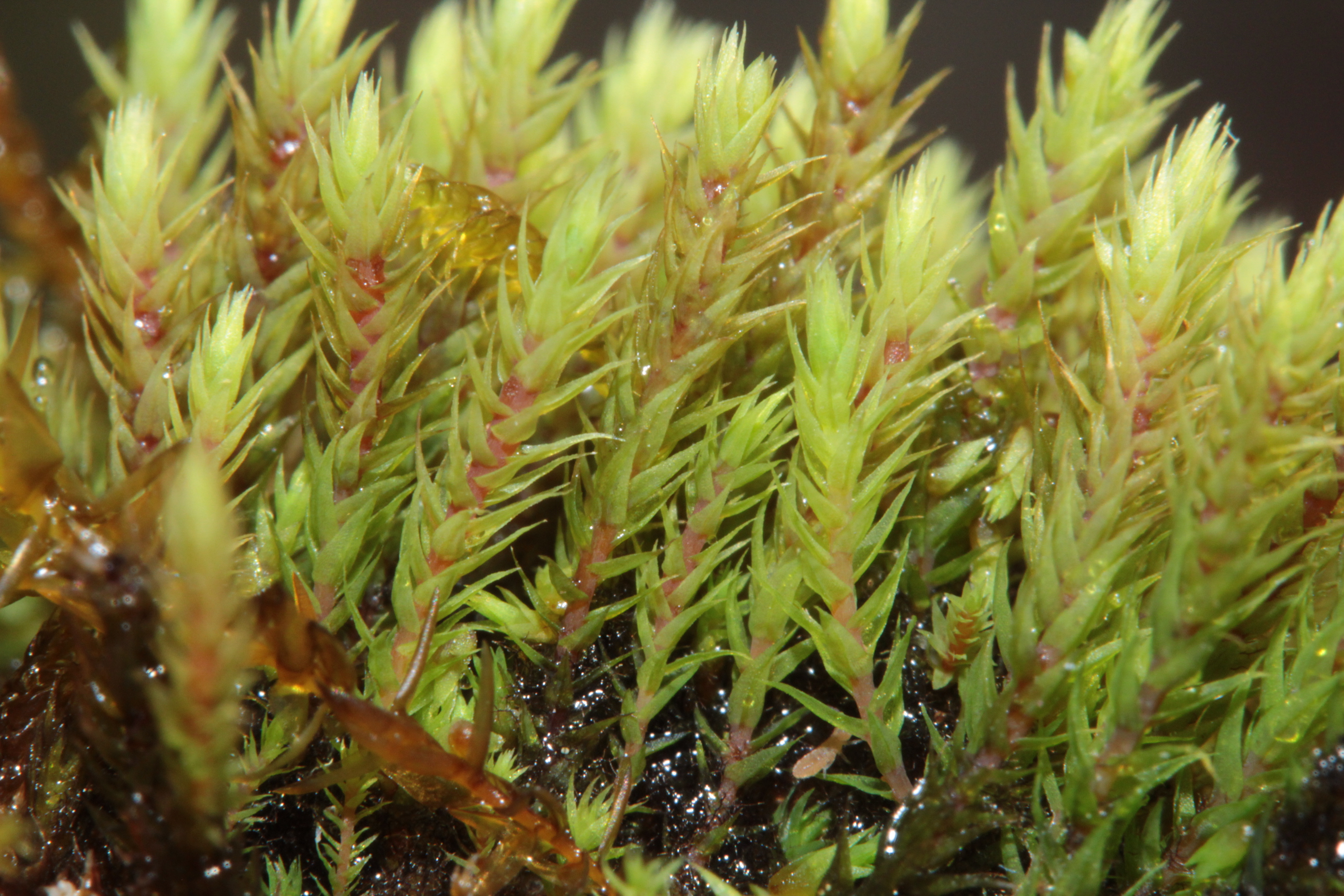

Scientific classification
- Kingdom: Plantae
- Division: Bryophyta
- Class: Bryopsida
- Subclass: Bryidae
- Order: Bartramiales
- Family: Bartramiaceae
- Genus: Philonotis
- Species: P. caespitosa

Binomial name
- Philonotis caespitosa Jur.

Synonyms
- Philonotis mollis Venturi

= Philonotis caespitosa =

Species of moss

Philonotis caespitosa is a species of moss belonging to the family Bartramiaceae.

It has almost cosmopolitan distribution.
