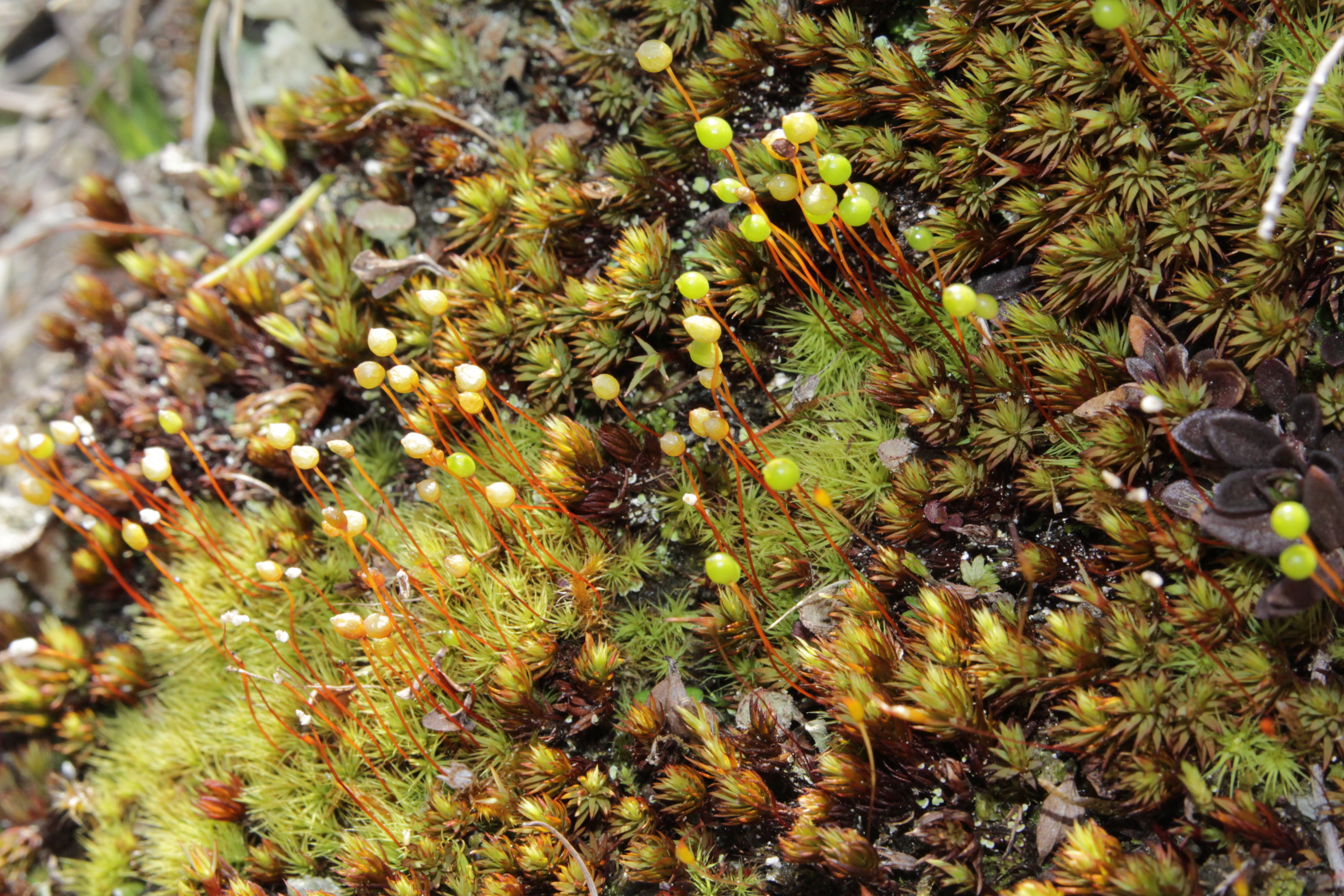

Scientific classification
- Kingdom: Plantae
- Division: Bryophyta
- Class: Bryopsida
- Subclass: Bryidae
- Order: Bartramiales
- Family: Bartramiaceae
- Genus: Bartramia
- Species: B. ithyphylla

Binomial name
- Bartramia ithyphylla Brid., 1830

= Bartramia ithyphylla =

Species of moss

Bartramia ithyphylla is a species of moss belonging to the family Bartramiaceae.
