= Bartramia =

Bartramia may refer to either of two genera:

- Bartramia (bird) is a genus of bird of the family Scolopacidae, including the upland sandpiper
- Bartramia (plant) is a genus of mosses in the class Bryopsida, including Haller's apple moss
