= Philonotis marchica =

Scientific classification
- Kingdom: Plantae
- Division: Bryophyta
- Class: Bryopsida
- Subclass: Bryidae
- Order: Bartramiales
- Family: Bartramiaceae
- Genus: Philonotis
- Species: P. marchica

Binomial name
- Philonotis marchica Bridel, 1827

Species of moss

Philonotis marchica is a species of moss belonging to the family Bartramiaceae.

This moss species has thin, erect stems and forms a felt-like layer. The species thrives in peat bogs, on or near the water. The moss can also float. The moss is found always in very small growing places.

It has almost cosmopolitan distribution. The moss is described as rare (in Europe). In the Netherlands, where it is almost non-existent, it is on the Dutch red list. It was in the Netherlands in the national news in January 2023, after the moss was found in Weerribben-Wieden National Park.
