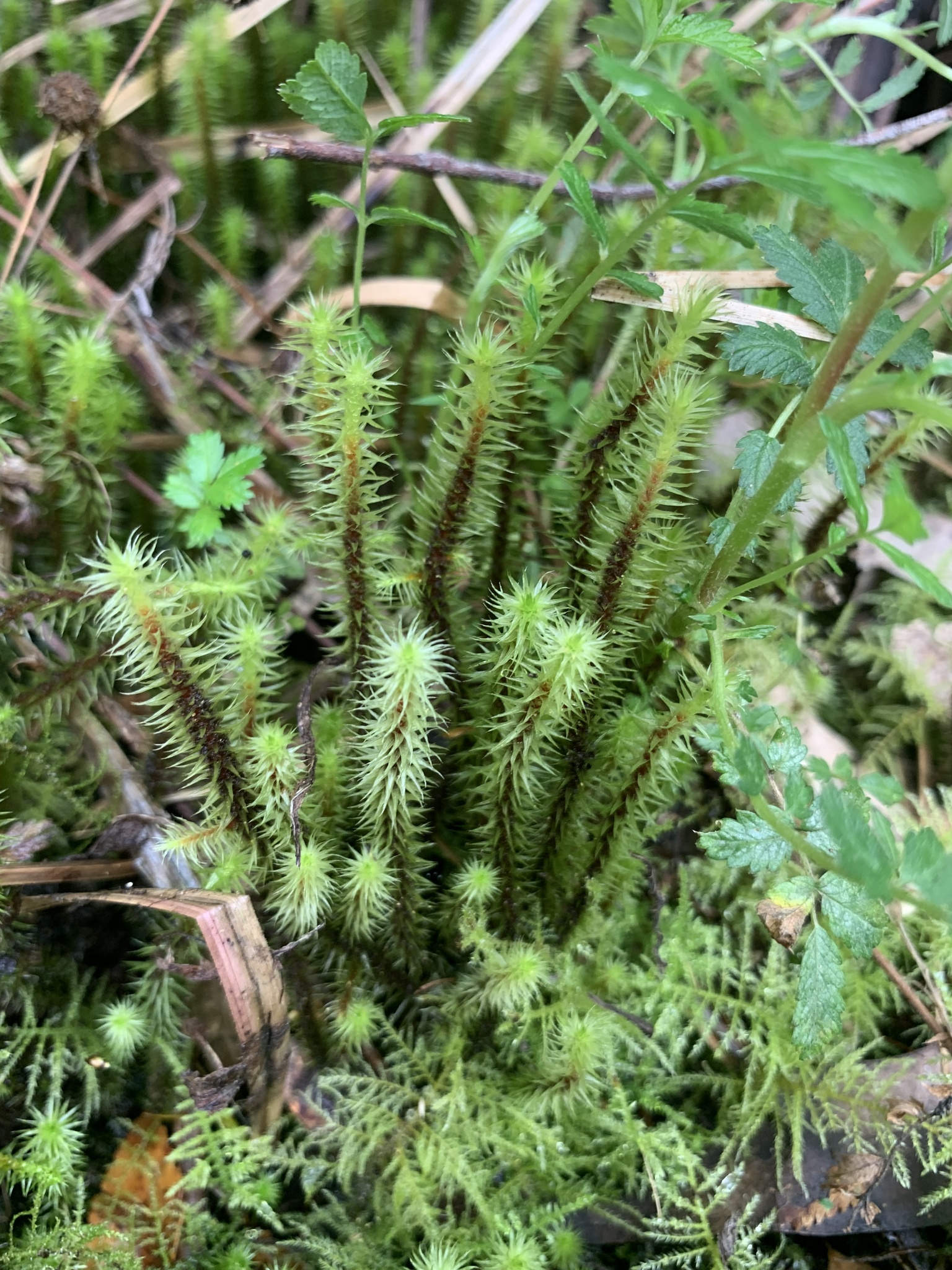

Scientific classification
- Kingdom: Plantae
- Division: Bryophyta
- Class: Bryopsida
- Subclass: Bryidae
- Order: Bartramiales
- Family: Bartramiaceae
- Genus: Breutelia
- Species: B. pendula

Binomial name
- Breutelia pendula (Sm.) Mitt.

Synonyms
- Bartramia pendula; Bartramia crassa; Breutelia sieberi

= Breutelia pendula =

Species of moss

Breutelia pendula is a species of moss. It occurs in Australia and New Zealand, including the subantarctic islands of Macquarie, Campbell, the Aucklands and the Antipodes.
