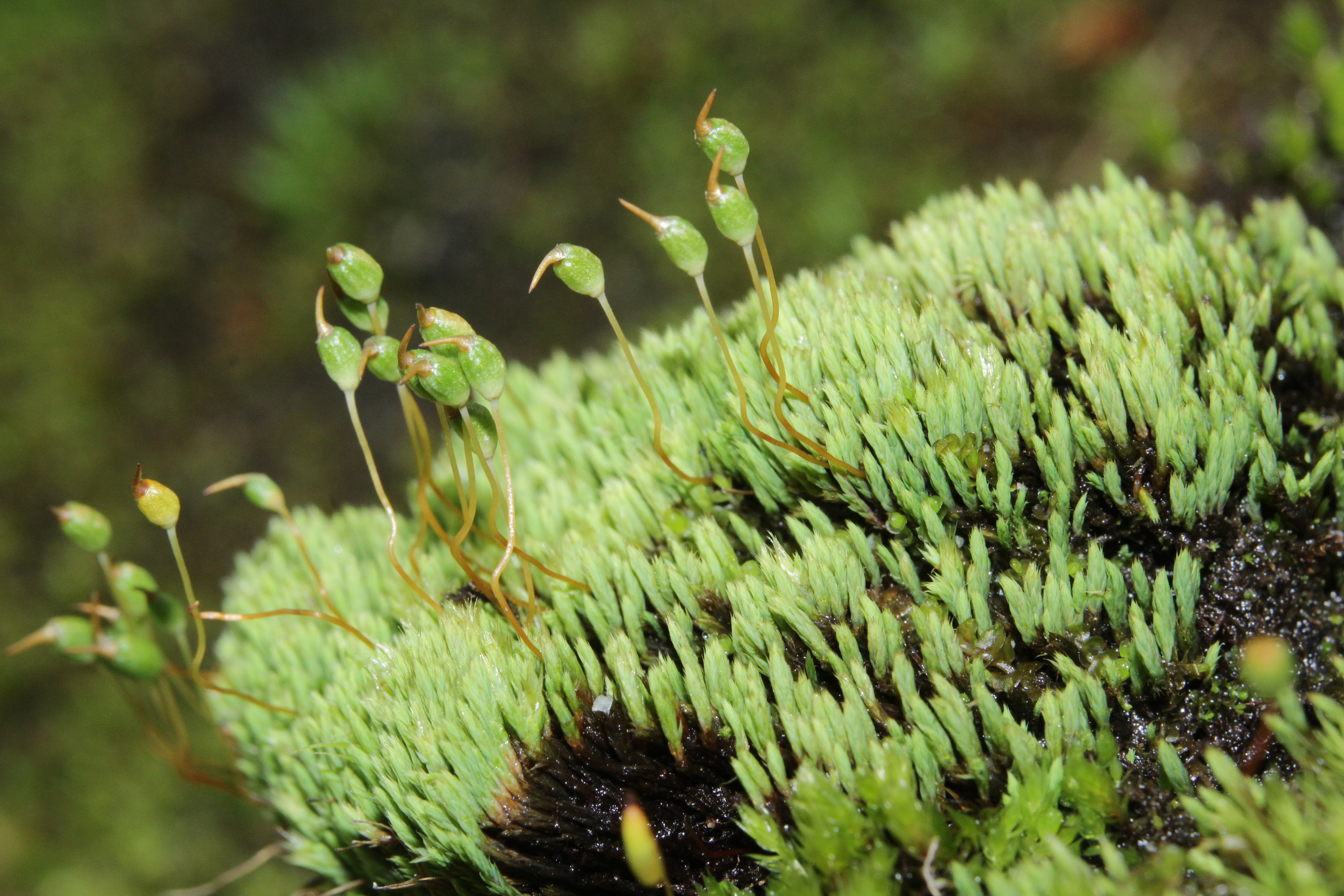
- In Austria

Scientific classification
- Kingdom: Plantae
- Division: Bryophyta
- Class: Bryopsida
- Subclass: Bryidae
- Order: Bartramiales
- Family: Bartramiaceae
- Genus: Conostomum
- Species: C. tetragonum

Binomial name
- Conostomum tetragonum (Hedw.) Lindb.

= Conostomum tetragonum =

Species of moss

Conostomum tetragonum, or helmet-moss, is a species of bryophyte found in Europe.

Shoots grow to a maximum height of 2 cm. Leaves are shaped like narrow spearheads and sharply pointed. Capsules are nearly spherical and 2mm long.

It thrives in acidic, rocky mountain soils, especially where there is snow cover for a large part of the year, and on summit ridges. It grows in continental Europe and in Scotland. This species became extinct in England in the 1950s.
