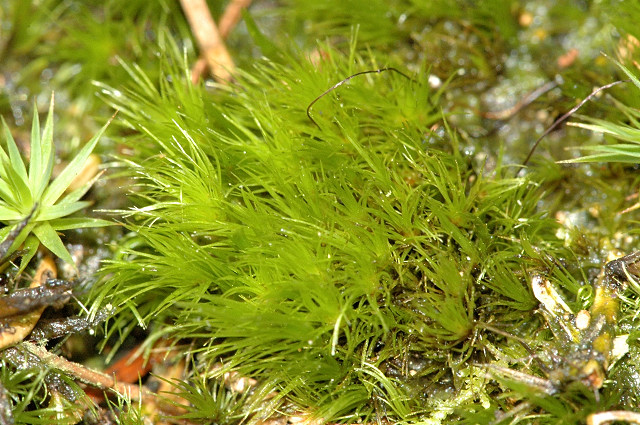

Scientific classification
- Kingdom: Plantae
- Division: Bryophyta
- Class: Bryopsida
- Subclass: Bryidae
- Order: Bartramiales
- Family: Bartramiaceae
- Genus: Bartramia
- Species: B. pomiformis

Binomial name
- Bartramia pomiformis Hedw. (1801)

= Bartramia pomiformis =

Species of moss

Bartramia pomiformis, the common apple-moss, is a species of moss in the Bartramiaceae family. It is typically green or glaucous in hue, although sometimes it can appear yellowish. The stems extend from a half cm to 8 cm, with narrowly lanceolate to linear-lanceolate leaves 4 – 9 mm long. The leaves have a nerve and are toothed. They are curled when dry but stick out when moist.

The capsules are particularly distinctive, being spherical and asymmetric, initially green but becoming brownish and ridged with age. They are around 2 mm diameter carried on a stalk 2 cm long.

Reddish rhizoids can often be seen on the stem.

The species is found in acidic or neutral substrates, particularly rock ledges, but also walls and earth banks. These sites are typically humid and shaded, often near streams or rivers.

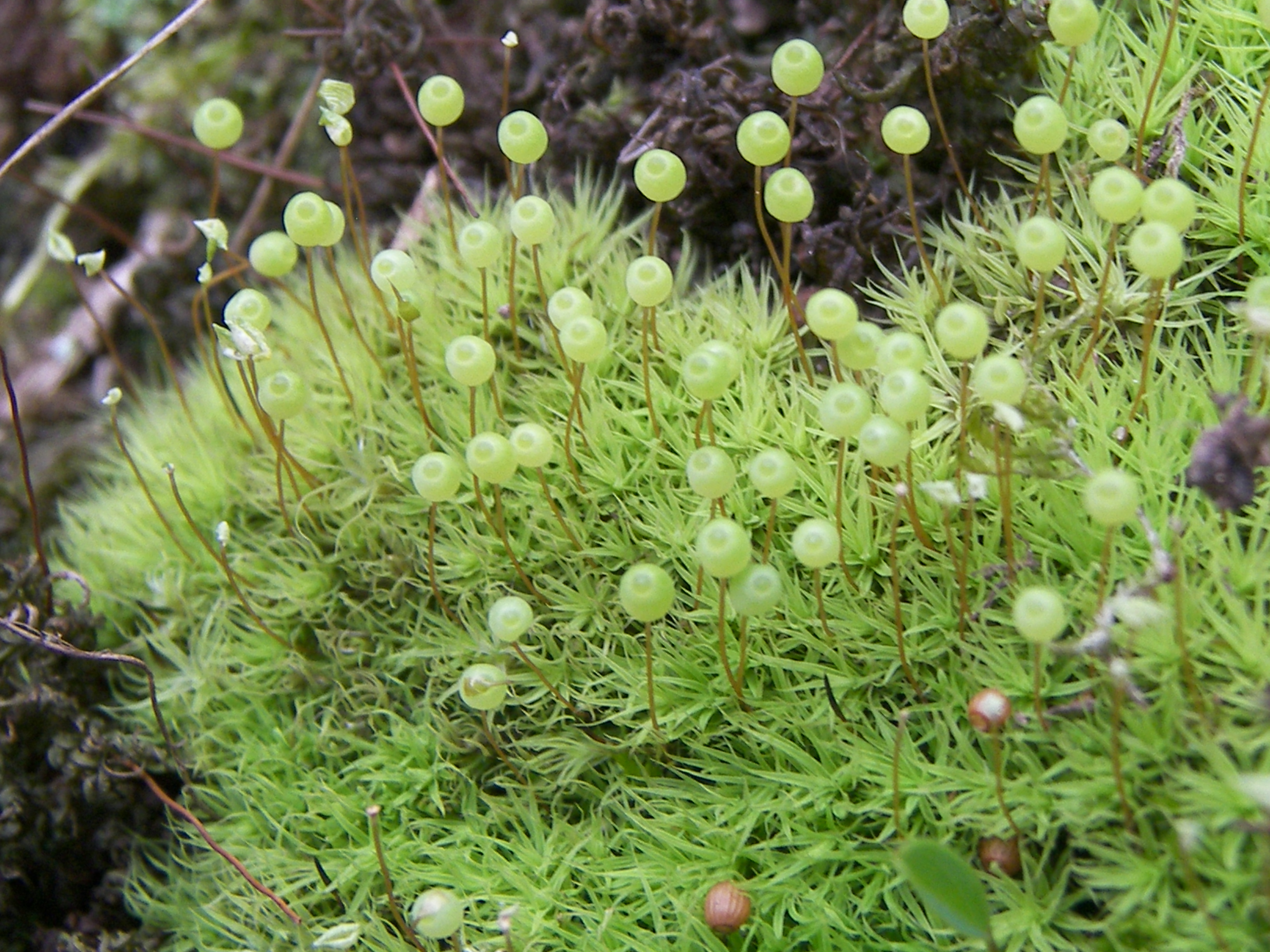
Bartramia pomiformis showing young and older capsules
