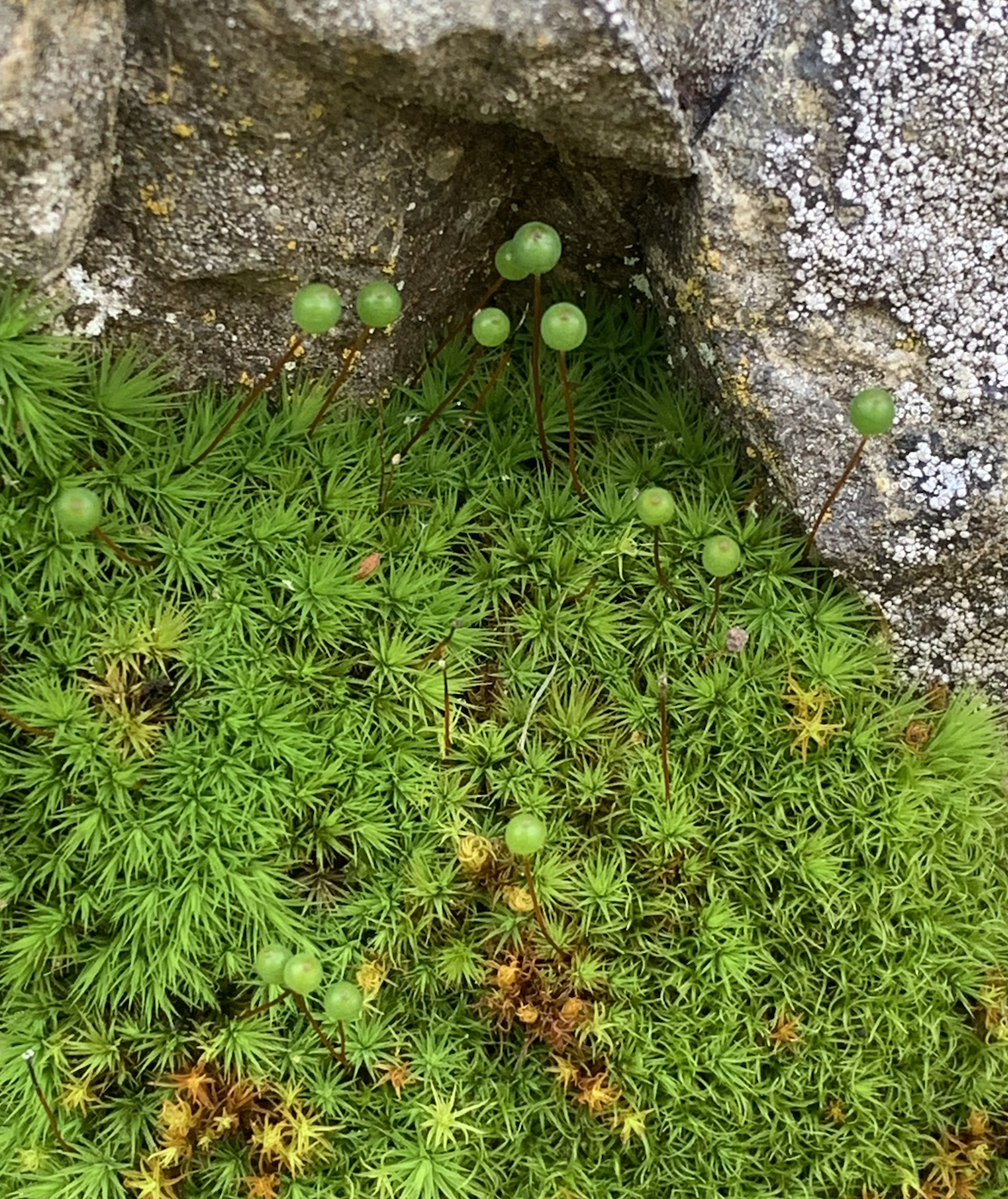

Scientific classification
- Kingdom: Plantae
- Clade: Embryophytes
- Division: Bryophyta
- Class: Bryopsida
- Subclass: Bryidae
- Order: Bartramiales
- Family: Bartramiaceae
- Genus: Bartramia
- Species: B. aprica

Binomial name
- Bartramia aprica Müll.Hal.

= Bartramia aprica =

Species of moss

Bartramia aprica, commonly called rigid apple moss or sometimes upright apple moss, is a species of moss in the family Bartramiaceae. It was formerly known as Bartramia stricta.

It has been observed in California, Texas and New Mexico, USA and British Columbia, Canada. It is described as a green to brownish-green perennial moss, growing small erect tufts in scattered colonies across rocky outcrops and shallow soil grasslands. Reproduction and dispersal occurs via spores, and as B. stricta has both female and male reproductive structures found within the same plant, ensuring successful fertilisation and sporangia and spore production and dispersal.
