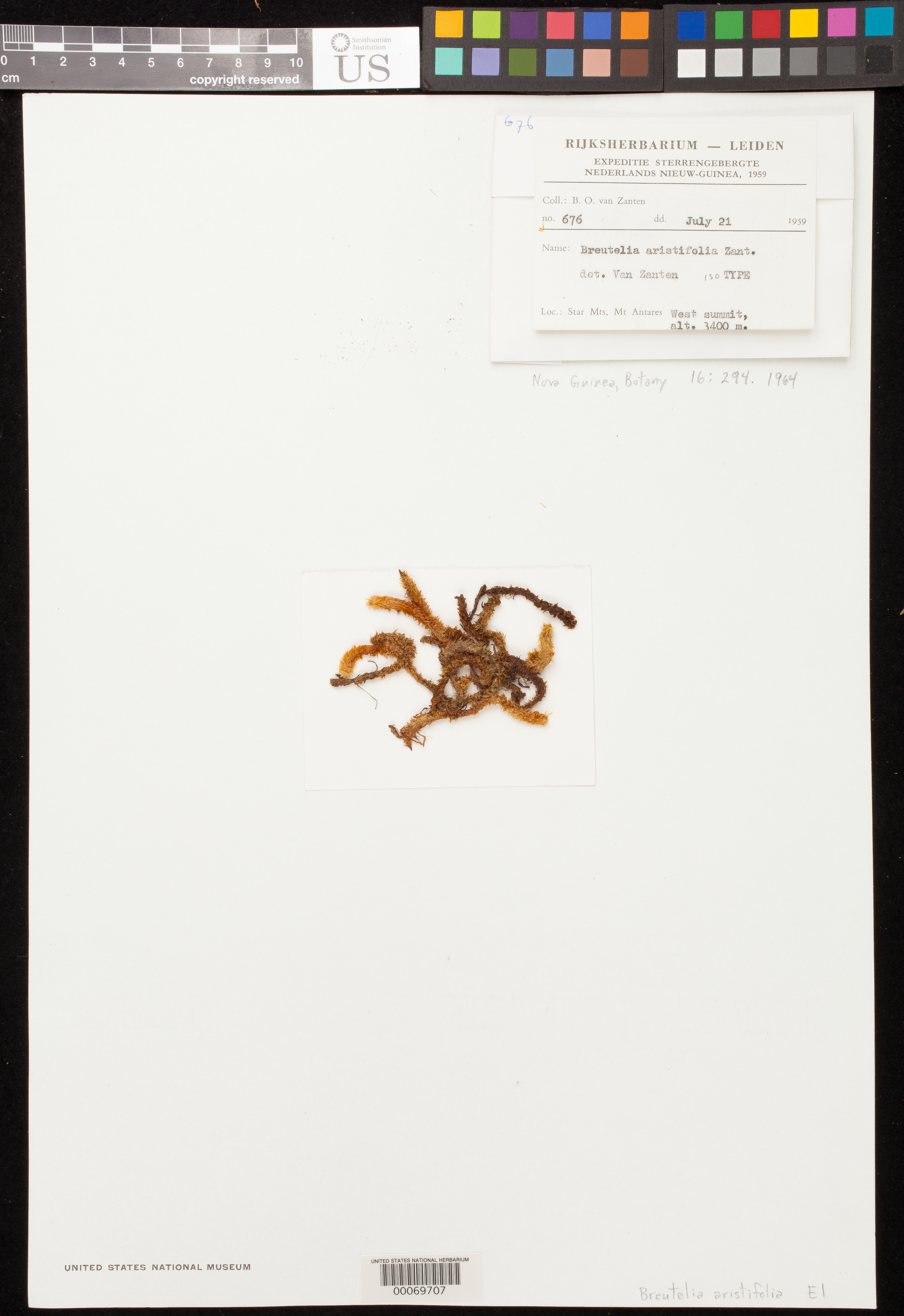
- Herbarium specimen

Scientific classification
- Kingdom: Plantae
- Division: Bryophyta
- Class: Bryopsida
- Subclass: Bryidae
- Order: Bartramiales
- Family: Bartramiaceae
- Genus: Breutelia
- Species: B. aristifolia

Binomial name
- Breutelia aristifolia Zanten

= Breutelia aristifolia =

Species of moss

Breutelia aristifolia is a species of moss in the family Bartramiaceae. It is endemic to New Guinea.
