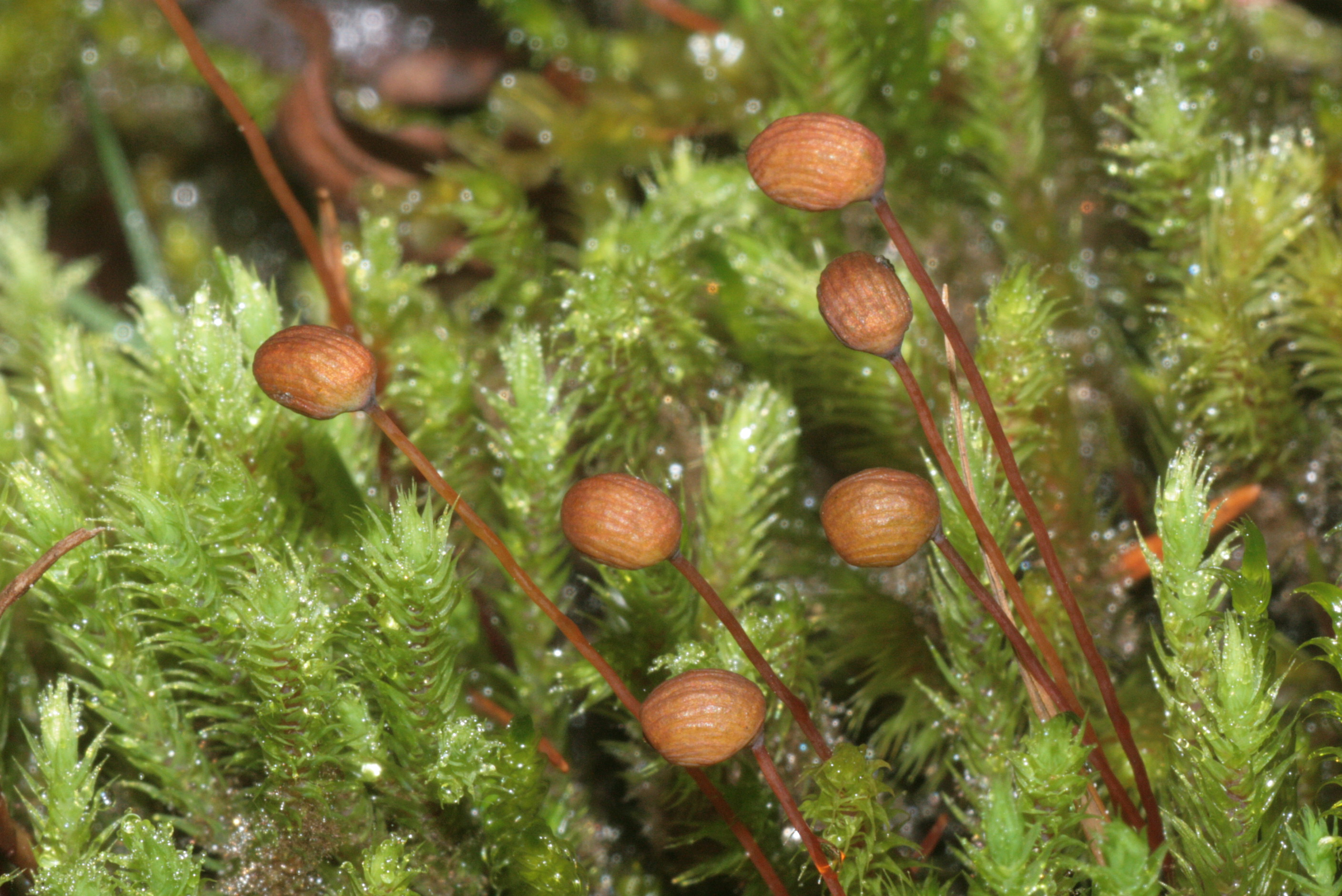

Scientific classification
- Kingdom: Plantae
- Division: Bryophyta
- Class: Bryopsida
- Subclass: Bryidae
- Order: Bartramiales
- Family: Bartramiaceae
- Genus: Philonotis
- Species: P. calcarea

Binomial name
- Philonotis calcarea (Bruch & Schimp.) Schimp.

= Philonotis calcarea =

Species of moss

Philonotis calcarea (vernacular name: thick-nerved apple-moss) is a species of moss belonging to the family Bartramiaceae.

It is native to Europe and Northern America.
