= Plagiopus =

Plagiopus may refer to:

- Plagiopus (copepod), a genus of copepods in the family Aetideidae
- Plagiopus (plant), a genus of mosses in the family Bartramiaceae
