= Neosharpiella =

Scientific classification
- Kingdom: Plantae
- Division: Bryophyta
- Class: Bryopsida
- Subclass: Bryidae
- Order: Bartramiales
- Family: Bartramiaceae
- Genus: Neosharpiella; H. Rob. & Delgad.

Species
- Neosharpiella aztecorum; Neosharpiella turgida

Genus of mosses

Neosharpiella is a genus of moss containing two species in the family Bartramiaceae. The type species, Neosharpiella aztecorum, grows in alpine regions of central Mexico, while the other species, Neosharpiella turgida, has been found in Bolivia and Ecuador.

The genus was circumscribed by Harold Ernest Robinson and Claudio Delgadillo Moya in Bryologist vol.76 (4) on page 537 in 1973.

The genus name of Neosharpiella is in honour of Aaron John Sharp (1904–1997), known professionally as Jack Sharp, who was an American botanist and bryologist, considered an expert on mosses.
