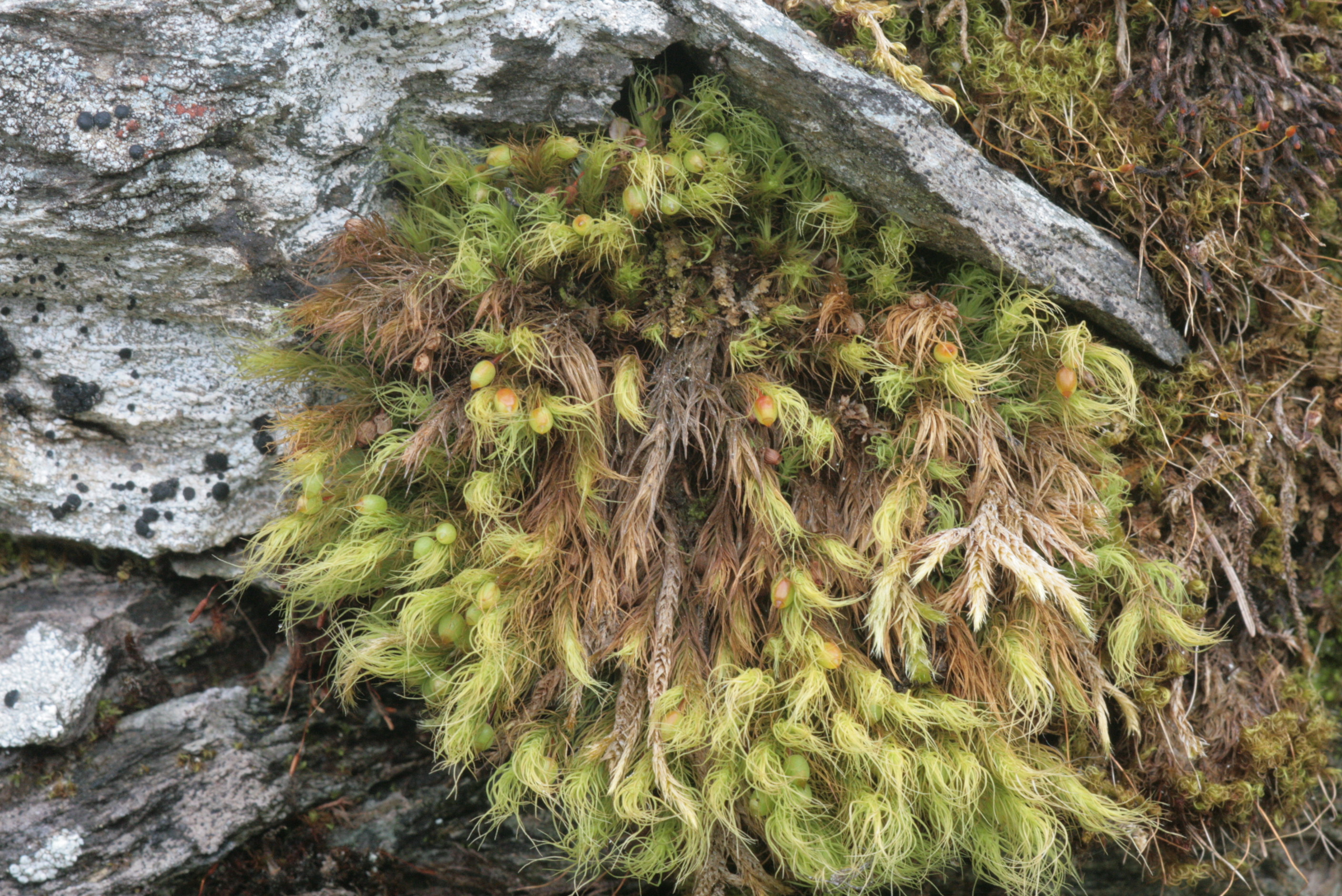

Scientific classification
- Kingdom: Plantae
- Division: Bryophyta
- Class: Bryopsida
- Subclass: Bryidae
- Order: Bartramiales
- Family: Bartramiaceae
- Genus: Bartramia
- Species: B. halleriana

Binomial name
- Bartramia halleriana Hedw.

= Bartramia halleriana =

Species of moss

Bartramia halleriana, the Haller's apple-moss or Haller's bartramia moss, is a species of moss in the family Bartramiaceae.
