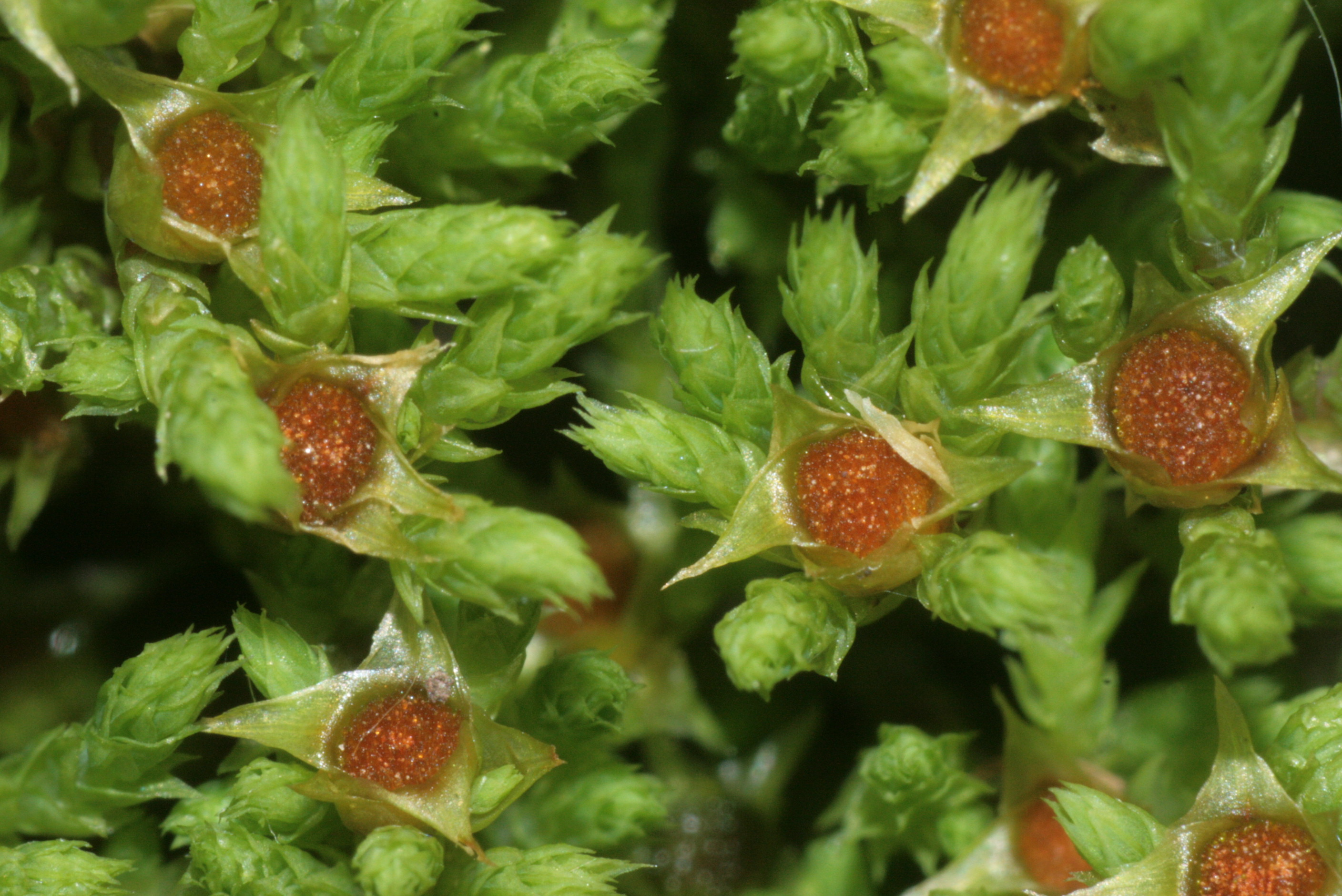
- Philonotis calcarea

Scientific classification
- Kingdom: Plantae
- Division: Bryophyta
- Class: Bryopsida
- Subclass: Bryidae
- Order: Bartramiales
- Family: Bartramiaceae
- Genus: Philonotis; Brid.

Synonyms
- Bartramia subgen. Philonotula Bruch & Schimp.; Philonotula (Bruch & Schimp.) Bruch & Schimp.; Bartramidula Bruch & Schimp.; Philonotula Hampe; Phylonotis Brid. ex Papp

= Philonotis =

Genus of mosses

Philonotis is a genus of mosses belonging to the family Bartramiaceae.

The genus was first described by Samuel Elisée Bridel-Brideri.

The genus has a cosmopolitan distribution.

== Species ==
The following species are recognised in the genus Philonotis:

- Philonotis africana (Müll. Hal.) Rehmann ex Paris
- Philonotis amblystegioides Demaret & P. de la Varde
- Philonotis americana Dism.
- Philonotis ampliretis Broth.
- Philonotis angusta Mitt.
- Philonotis angustiretis Broth. ex T.J. Kop.
- Philonotis arbusculacea (Müll. Hal.) A. Jaeger
- Philonotis aristifolia E.B. Bartram
- Philonotis asperifolia Mitt.
- Philonotis australiensis D.G. Griffin & W.R. Buck
- Philonotis austrofalcata Broth. & Watts
- Philonotis baginsensis (Müll. Hal.) A. Jaeger
- Philonotis bartramioides (Griff.) D.G. Griffin & W.R. Buck
- Philonotis breutelioides Shevock & Aguero
- Philonotis brevicuspis Broth.
- Philonotis buckii D.G. Griffin
- Philonotis byssiformis Müll. Hal. ex Besch.
- Philonotis caespitosa Jur.
- Philonotis calcarea (Bruch & Schimp.) Schimp.
- Philonotis calomicra Broth.
- Philonotis capillaris Lindb.
- Philonotis capillata (Mitt.) Paris
- Philonotis cernua (Wilson) D.G. Griffin & W.R. Buck
- Philonotis clavicaulis Herzog
- Philonotis comosa (Broth.) D.G. Griffin & W.R. Buck
- Philonotis conostomoides Ochyra
- Philonotis corticata H.A. Crum & D.G. Griffin
- Philonotis curvula (Müll. Hal.) Kindb.
- Philonotis cygnea (Mont.) D.G. Griffin & W.R. Buck
- Philonotis dispersa (Cardot & P. de la Varde) D.G. Griffin & W.R. Buck
- Philonotis dregeana (Müll. Hal.) A. Jaeger
- Philonotis elongata (Dism.) H.A. Crum & Steere
- Philonotis erecta (Mitt.) D.G. Griffin & W.R. Buck
- Philonotis esquelensis Matteri
- Philonotis eurydictyon Herzog
- Philonotis falcata (Hook.) Mitt.
- Philonotis fendleri (Müll. Hal.) D.G. Griffin & W.R. Buck
- Philonotis filiramea (Müll. Hal.) Paris
- Philonotis flaccidifolia (Mitt.) Paris
- Philonotis flavinervis (Müll. Hal.) Kindb.
- Philonotis fontana (Hedw.) Brid.
- Philonotis fontanella (Hampe) A. Jaeger
- Philonotis fontanoides (Gillies ex Grev.) A. Jaeger
- Philonotis fugacissima Paris
- Philonotis gemmascens (Müll. Hal.) Kindb.
- Philonotis globosa (Müll. Hal.) D.G. Griffin & W.R. Buck
- Philonotis gracilescens Schimp. ex C.H. Wright
- Philonotis hansenii (Müll. Hal.) Paris
- Philonotis hastata (Duby) Wijk & Margad.
- Philonotis hawaica (Müll. Hal.) Broth.
- Philonotis helenica (Besch.) Paris
- Philonotis huallagensis Broth.
- Philonotis incana (Taylor) H. Rob.
- Philonotis incrassata (Müll. Hal.) Kindb.
- Philonotis jungneri Broth.
- Philonotis krausei (Müll. Hal.) Broth.
- Philonotis laeviuscula Dixon
- Philonotis lancifolia Mitt.
- Philonotis le-testui (P. de la Varde) D.G. Griffin & W.R. Buck
- Philonotis leptocarpa Mitt.
- Philonotis lignicola Dism. & Herzog
- Philonotis lizangii T.J. Kop.
- Philonotis longiseta (Michx.) E. Britton
- Philonotis macrodictya (Müll. Hal.) Kindb.
- Philonotis marangensis Broth.
- Philonotis marchica (Hedw.) Brid.
- Philonotis mauritiana Ångstr.
- Philonotis mbelabiensis P. de la Varde
- Philonotis microthamnia Broth.
- Philonotis minuta (Taylor) A. Jaeger
- Philonotis mniobryoides Broth.
- Philonotis mollis (Dozy & Molk.) Mitt.
- Philonotis moritziana (Hampe) A. Jaeger
- Philonotis myriocarpa Schimp. ex Renauld & Cardot
- Philonotis nana (Müll. Hal.) D.G. Griffin & W.R. Buck
- Philonotis nanothecia (Müll. Hal.) Kindb.
- Philonotis nanothecioidea Paris & Broth.
- Philonotis niam-niamiae (Müll. Hal.) A. Jaeger
- Philonotis norrisii T.J. Kop.
- Philonotis operta R.S. Williams
- Philonotis osculatiana De Not.
- Philonotis papillarioides (Müll. Hal.) Paris
- Philonotis patentissima Renauld & Cardot
- Philonotis pechuelii (Müll. Hal.) Kindb.
- Philonotis penicillata C.H. Wright
- Philonotis perconferta Broth.
- Philonotis pergracilis Cardot
- Philonotis perlaxifolia Dixon
- Philonotis perpusilla Cardot
- Philonotis perrieri Thér.
- Philonotis plana Dixon & Herzog
- Philonotis platensis Paris
- Philonotis platyneura P. de la Varde
- Philonotis polymorpha (Müll. Hal.) Kindb.
- Philonotis pomangium (Müll. Hal.) Kindb.
- Philonotis pseudomollis (Müll. Hal.) A. Jaeger
- Philonotis pungens (Mitt.) Mitt.
- Philonotis pygmaeola (Müll. Hal.) A. Jaeger
- Philonotis pyriformis (R. Br. bis) Wijk & Margad.
- Philonotis rigida Brid.
- Philonotis roylei (Hook. f.) Mitt.
- Philonotis rufiflora (Hornsch.) Reichardt
- Philonotis ruwenzorensis Thér. & Naveau
- Philonotis scabrifolia (Hook. f. & Wilson) Braithw.
- Philonotis schroederi Broth.
- Philonotis secunda (Dozy & Molk.) Bosch & Sande Lac.
- Philonotis seriata Mitt.
- Philonotis sikkimensis (Kabiersch) T.J. Kop.
- Philonotis simplicissima (Müll. Hal.) Kindb.
- Philonotis slateri (Hampe) A. Jaeger
- Philonotis soulii P. de la Varde
- Philonotis sparsifolia (Hampe) A. Jaeger
- Philonotis speciosa (Griff.) Mitt.
- Philonotis speirophylla Dixon
- Philonotis sphaerocarpa (Hedw.) Brid.
- Philonotis spongiosa (Welw. & Duby) A. Gepp
- Philonotis streimannii T.J. Kop.
- Philonotis strictiuscula (Müll. Hal.) Paris
- Philonotis strictula Cardot
- Philonotis submarchica Besch.
- Philonotis subolescens (Müll. Hal.) Paris
- Philonotis subrigida Cardot & P. de la Varde
- Philonotis subsimplex Broth. & Paris
- Philonotis subsphaericarpa Broth.
- Philonotis sullivantii (Müll. Hal.) Paris
- Philonotis tenuis (Taylor) Reichardt
- Philonotis thwaitesii Mitt.
- Philonotis tjibodensis (M. Fleisch.) Broth.
- Philonotis tomentella Molendo
- Philonotis trachyphylla Dixon & Badhw.
- Philonotis trichodonta (Müll. Hal.) Kindb.
- Philonotis trichophylla Besch.
- Philonotis tricolor (Müll. Hal.) Kindb.
- Philonotis tuerckheimii (Müll. Hal.) D.G. Griffin & W.R. Buck
- Philonotis turneriana (Schwägr.) Mitt.
- Philonotis uncinata (Schwägr.) Brid.
- Philonotis usambarica Broth.
- Philonotis vagans (Hook. f. & Wilson) Mitt.
- Philonotis vanderystii Cardot
- Philonotis vescoana (Besch.) Paris
- Philonotis yezoana Besch. & Cardot
