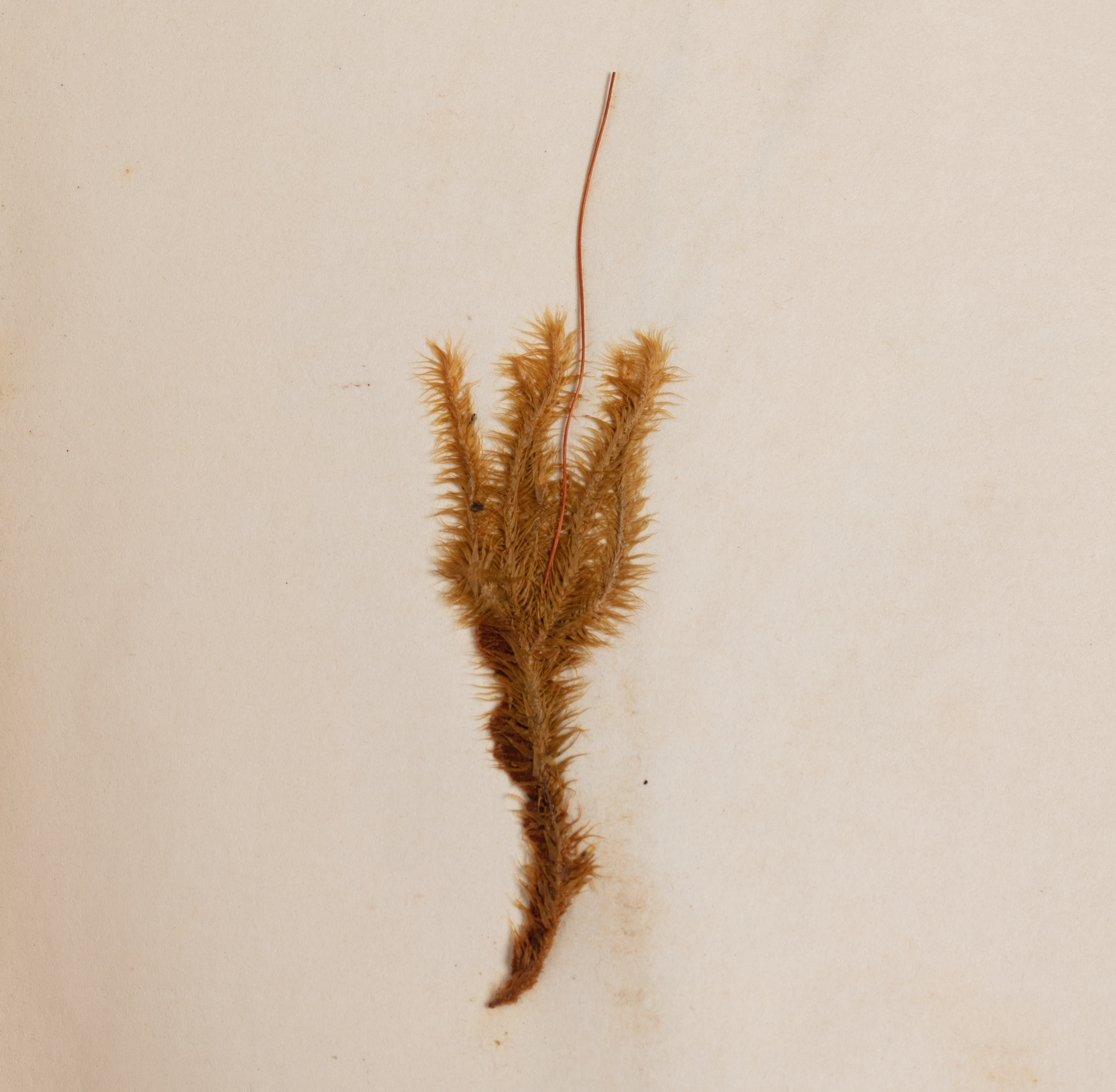
- Breutelia pendula

Scientific classification
- Kingdom: Plantae
- Division: Bryophyta
- Class: Bryopsida
- Subclass: Bryidae
- Order: Bartramiales
- Family: Bartramiaceae
- Genus: Breutelia (Bruch & Schimp.) Schimp., 1856

Diversity
- 94 species

= Breutelia =

Genus of mosses

Breutelia is a genus of moss in the family Bartramiaceae. It has a worldwide distribution and contains about 200 species. Its name honours botanist Johann Christian Breutel (1788–1875). The type species is Breutelia arcuata.

== Species ==
Breutelia currently contains 94 species.

1. Breutelia aciphylla (Wilson in Mitten) Jaeger, 1875
2. Breutelia affinis (W. J. Hooker) Mitten, 1856
3. Breutelia anacolioides Herzog, 1916
4. Breutelia angustiretis E. B. Bartram, 1946
5. Breutelia anomala R. S. Williams, 1928
6. Breutelia aristifolia Zanten, 1964
7. Breutelia arundinifolia (Duby in Moritzi) Fleischer, 1904
8. Breutelia aureola (Bescherelle ex C. Müller) Bescherelle, 1885
9. Breutelia auriculata E. B. Bartram, 1946
10. Breutelia austro-arcuata (C. Müller) Paris, 1894
11. Breutelia azorica (Mitten in Godman) Cardot, 1897
12. Breutelia baeuerlenii (C. Müller) Watts & Whitelegge, 1906
13. Breutelia borbonica Sloover, 1975
14. Breutelia brachyphylla Brotherus, 1920
15. Breutelia brevifolia Herzog, 1916
16. Breutelia breviseta Brotherus, 1904
17. Breutelia brittoniae Renauld & Cardot, 1893
18. Breutelia campbelliana (C. Müller) Watts & Whitelegge, 1906
19. Breutelia chrysea (C. Müller) Jaeger, 1875
20. Breutelia chrysocoma (Hedwig) Lindberg, 1863
21. Breutelia crassicaulis (C. Müller) Paris, 1900
22. Breutelia dicranacea (C. Müller) Mitten, 1859
23. Breutelia diffracta Mitten, 1863
24. Breutelia dominicensis E. B. Bartram, 1955
25. Breutelia dumosa Mitten, 1859
26. Breutelia eggersiana (C. Müller) Brotherus in Paris, 1904
27. Breutelia elliptica Magill, 1987
28. Breutelia elongata (J. D. Hooker & Wilson) Mitten in F. Müller, 1881
29. Breutelia eugeniae Ångström, 1873
30. Breutelia gnaphalea (Palisot de Beauvois) Mitten, 1864
31. Breutelia gracillima Brotherus in Mildbraed, 1910
32. Breutelia grandis (Hampe) Paris, 1894
33. Breutelia guilielmi-meyeri J. Fröhlich, 1962
34. Breutelia harpophylla Herzog, 1920
35. Breutelia hasskarliana (Hampe) Jaeger, 1875
36. Breutelia humbertii Potier de la Varde & Thériot, 1940
37. Breutelia incana (Taylor) Jaeger, 1875
38. Breutelia inclinata (Hampe & Lorentz) Jaeger, 1875
39. Breutelia integrifolia (Taylor) Jaeger, 1875
40. Breutelia jamaicensis (Mitten) Jaeger, 1875
41. Breutelia karsteniana (C. Müller) Jaeger, 1875
42. Breutelia kilimandscharica (C. Müller) Paris, 1894
43. Breutelia kinabaluensis Dixon, 1935
44. Breutelia leptodontoides (C. Müller) Watts & Whitelegge, 1906
45. Breutelia lonchopelma (C. Müller) Watts & Whitelegge, 1906
46. Breutelia longicapsularis Dixon, 1922
47. Breutelia luteola C. Müller ex Brotherus in Geheeb, 1897
48. Breutelia macrocarpa W. P. Schimper ex Paris, 1900
49. Breutelia madagassa Thériot in Potier de la Varde, 1940
50. Breutelia maegdefraui H. Crum, 1987
51. Breutelia magadalenae Sloover, 1975
52. Breutelia microdonta (Mitten) Brotherus, 1895
53. Breutelia minuta Herzog, 1916
54. Breutelia mohriana (C. Müller) Brotherus, 1904
55. Breutelia muelleri Jaeger, 1875
56. Breutelia muhavurensis Potier de la Varde & Thériot, 1940
57. Breutelia nigrescens Herzog, 1909
58. Breutelia papuensis Virtanen, 1996
59. Breutelia pendula (Smith) Mitten, 1859
60. Breutelia perrieri Thériot, 1926
61. Breutelia picardae (C. Müller) Brotherus, 1904
62. Breutelia pilifera B. H. Allen & Griffin, 1999
63. Breutelia plicata Mitten, 1859
64. Breutelia polygastrica (C. Müller) Brotherus, 1904
65. Breutelia popinqua Kaalaas, 1912
66. Breutelia pseudophilonotis (C. Müller) Watts & Whitelegge, 1906
67. Breutelia reclinata Brotherus, 1920
68. Breutelia rhythidioides Herzog, 1934
69. Breutelia roemeri Fleischer, 1911
70. Breutelia ryvardenii Bizot, 1976
71. Breutelia scariosula (C. Müller) Brotherus, 1904
72. Breutelia sciuroides Thériot, 1926
73. Breutelia scoparia (Schwägrichen) Jaeger, 1875
74. Breutelia scorpioides (C. Müller ex Britton) Brotherus, 1904
75. Breutelia secundifolia (C. Müller) C. Müller, 1897
76. Breutelia squarrosa Jaeger, 1875
77. Breutelia stenodictyon (Renauld & Cardot) Brotherus, 1904
78. Breutelia stricticaulis Dixon, 1918
79. Breutelia stuhlmannii Brotherus, 1894
80. Breutelia subarcuata (C. Müller) W. P. Schimper in Bescherelle, 1872
81. Breutelia subdisticha (Hampe) Jaeger, 1875
82. Breutelia submniocarpa (C. Müller) Paris, 1900
83. Breutelia subplicata Brotherus in Thériot, 1911
84. Breutelia substricta (W. P. Schimper in C. Müller) Magill, 1987
85. Breutelia subtomentosa (Hampe) Jaeger, 1875
86. Breutelia tabularis Dixon in Sim, 1926
87. Breutelia tenuifolia (Mitten in Melliss) Paris, 1900
88. Breutelia tomentosa (Swartz ex Bridel) Jaeger, 1875
89. Breutelia trianae (Hampe) Jaeger, 1875
90. Breutelia tundrae Buck, 2020
91. Breutelia ulicina Herzog, 1927
92. Breutelia viguieri Cardot, 1916
93. Breutelia wainioi Brotherus, 1888
94. Breutelia witherheadii (C. Müller) Watts & Whitelegge, 1906
