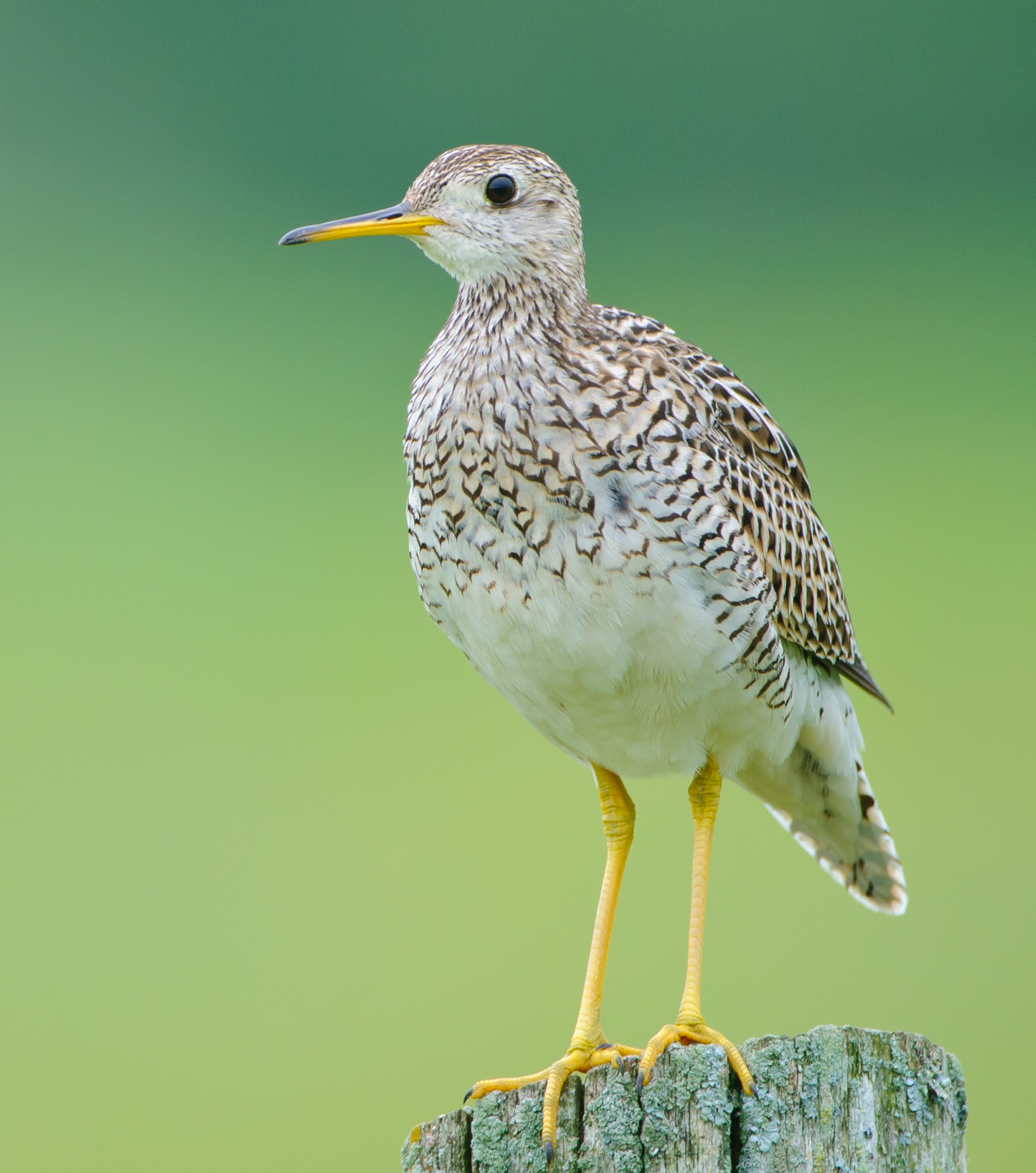
- An upland sandpiper perching in Ontario, Canada

Conservation status
- Least Concern (IUCN 3.1)

Scientific classification
- Kingdom: Animalia
- Phylum: Chordata
- Class: Aves
- Order: Charadriiformes
- Family: Scolopacidae
- Genus: Bartramia
- Species: B. longicauda

Binomial name
- Bartramia longicauda (Bechstein, 1812)

Synonyms
- Tringa longicauda Bechstein, 1812

= Upland sandpiper =

Species of bird

The upland sandpiper (Bartramia longicauda) is a large sandpiper, closely related to the curlews. Older names are the upland plover and Bartram's sandpiper. In Louisiana, it is also colloquially known as the papabotte. It is the sole extant member of the genus Bartramia. The genus name and the old common name Bartram's sandpiper commemorate the American naturalist William Bartram. The species name longicauda is from Latin longus, "long" and caudus, "tail". The name "Bartram's sandpiper" was made popular by Alexander Wilson, who was taught ornithology and natural history illustration by Bartram.

== Description ==
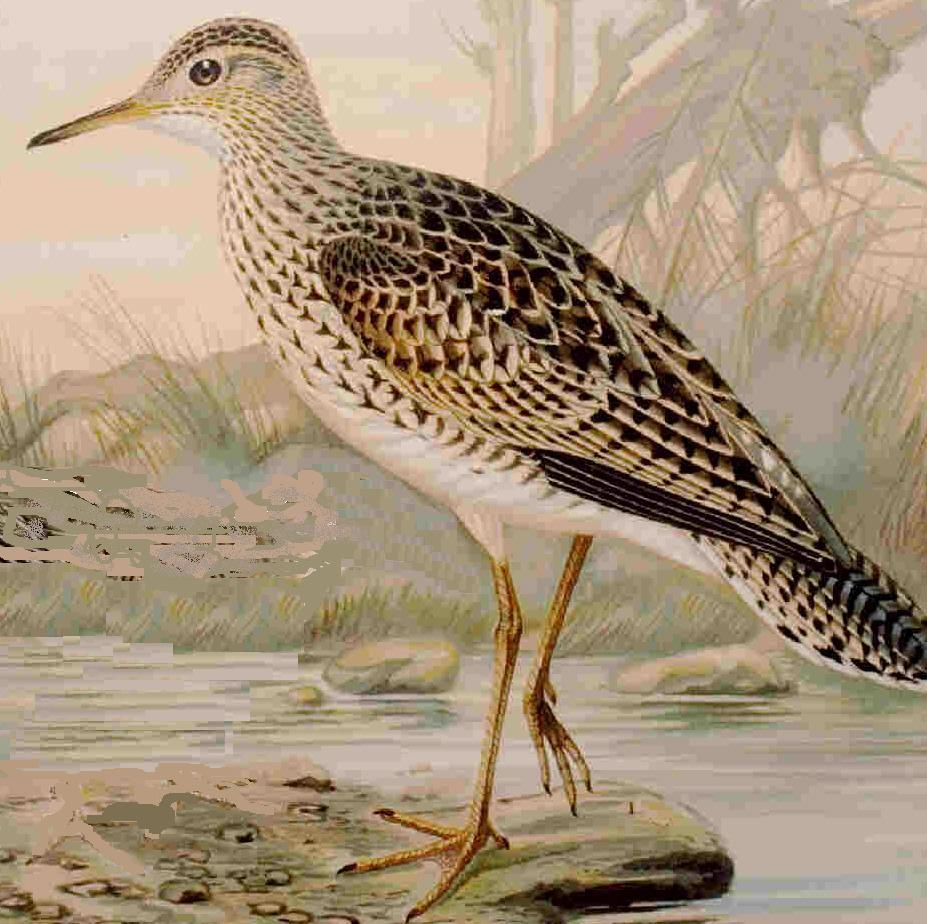
From Naumann

An adult is roughly 30 cm (12 in) long with a 66 cm (26 in) wingspan. The average weight is 170 g (6 oz). This odd bird has a small dove-like head on a long neck. It is heavily marbled black and brown on the back and wings. The neck is streaked with dark brown which continues down to the breast and on to the flanks. The belly and undertail coverts are white, and the tail is quite long for a sandpiper. The upland sandpiper also has a white eye-ring and long yellow legs.

== Range ==
They breed from eastern Alaska south east of the Rocky Mountains through Montana to northern Oklahoma and then northeast to Pennsylvania, New England and extreme southern Quebec and Ontario. There are also local breeding populations in northeast Oregon and west central Idaho. They winter in northeastern Argentina, Uruguay and southern Brazil. It is an extremely rare vagrant to Europe, and to the South Pacific, with one record each from Australia and New Zealand.

== Habitat ==
Even though they are sandpipers, they prefer open country with tall grasses to coastal habitat. They are also found at airports, blueberry farms and abandoned strip mines in the east. Their true core range and habitat is in the northern midwest United States.

== Behavior and diet ==
Upland sandpipers forage in fields, picking up food by sight. They are frequently sighted on fence posts and even telephone poles. When an "uppy" alights, it holds its wings up for a few seconds. They are constantly scanning the horizon for intruders. The upland sandpiper's diet includes grasshoppers, crickets, weevils, beetles, moths, ants, flies, bugs, centipedes, millipedes, spiders, snails, and earthworms. It also eats some grains and seeds.

Every year, between September and October, some upland sandpipers migrate to Ozogoche lagoons, in southern Ecuador. Hundreds of them swoop down and dive into the icy waters of the lagoons, where they die of hypothermia. The explanation for this behavior is uncertain.

=== Breeding ===
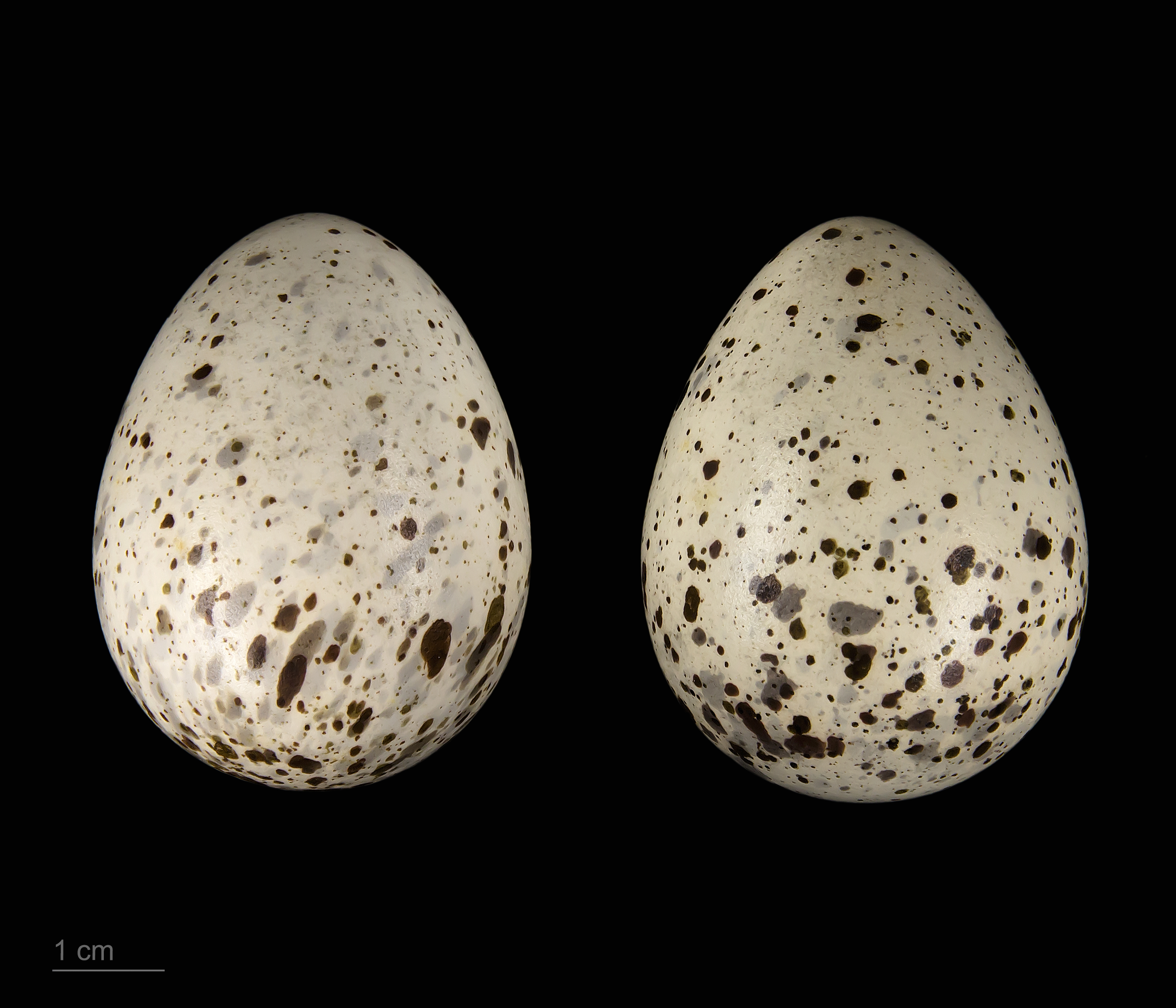
Bartramia longicauda - MHNT

Upland sandpipers can sometimes be found in small, loose nesting colonies. The breeding season is from early-to-late summer; nests are located on the ground in dense grass. The female lays 4 eggs. Both parents look after the young and may perform distraction displays to lure predators away from the nest or young birds.

=== Call ===
Call

Upland sandpipers can be identified by a distinctive call, sometimes called a "wolf whistle", which features a long, ascending whistle followed by a second rising and/or falling call. These sounds are often made while the bird is landing or while flying high.

== Conservation ==
The numbers of these birds increased as forests were cleared in the early 19th century, but declined sharply in the late 19th century due to hunting. They are now regularly present in Midwestern North America but populations are scattered in the east.

Loss of prairie habitat is a concern. Also, livestock grazing has been found to reduce the number of nests in a field. Controlled burns may benefit this species as they feed on low-growing plants that are more easily spotted after a fire.
