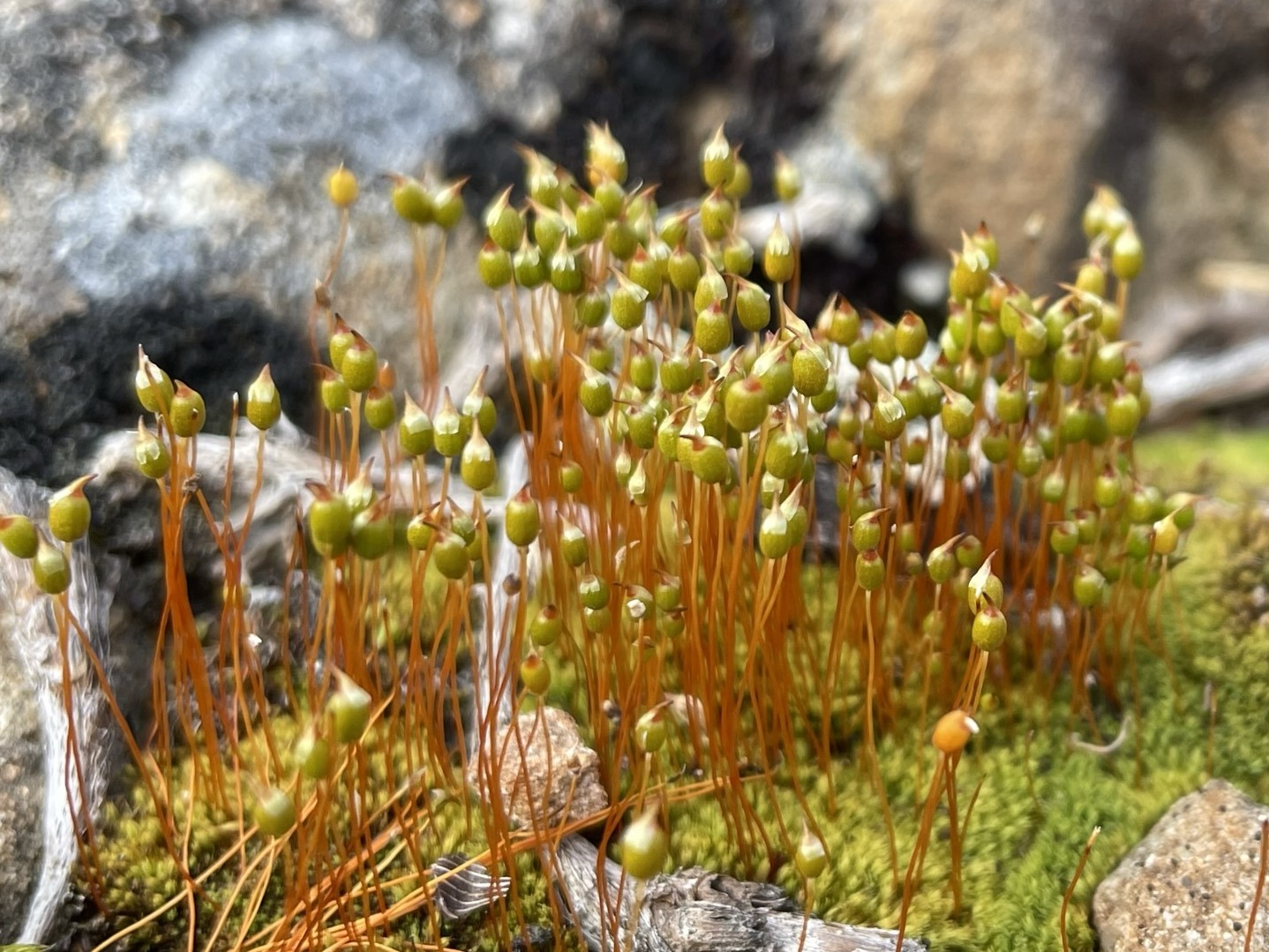
- Conostomum pentastichum

Scientific classification
- Kingdom: Plantae
- Division: Bryophyta
- Class: Bryopsida
- Subclass: Bryidae
- Order: Bartramiales
- Family: Bartramiaceae
- Genus: Conostomum; Sw. ex F.Weber & D.Mohr

= Conostomum =

Genus of mosses

Conostomum is a genus of mosses belonging to the family Bartramiaceae.

== Species ==
The following species are recognised in the genus Conostomum:

- Conostomum cleistocarpum Herzog
- Conostomum curvirostrum (Mitt.) Mitt.
- Conostomum macrotheca Herzog
- Conostomum magellanicum Sull.
- Conostomum pentastichum (Brid.) Lindb.
- Conostomum perpusillum Cardot & Broth.
- Conostomum pusillum Hook. f. & Wilson
- Conostomum tetragonum (Hedw.) Lindb.
