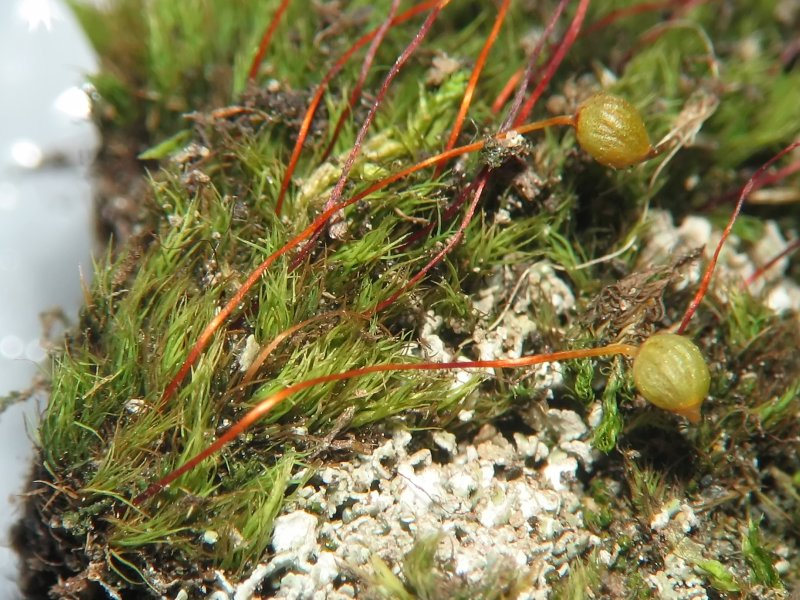
- Bartramia ithyphylla

Scientific classification
- Kingdom: Plantae
- Clade: Embryophytes
- Division: Bryophyta
- Class: Bryopsida
- Subclass: Bryidae
- Order: Bartramiales
- Family: Bartramiaceae
- Genus: Bartramia; Hedw.

Species
- See text

= Bartramia (plant) =

Genus of mosses

Bartramia is a genus of mosses in the family Bartramiaceae. The genus was first formally described by Johann Hedwig in 1801. There are about 72 species, usually growing on soil, sometimes on rocks, in many habitats in many parts of the world, although tropical species are only found at high altitudes. Nine species occur in Australia but only three of these are endemic to that continent.

== Description ==
Mosses in the genus Bartramia form "tufts" or "cushions" of plants 2–12 cm (0.8–5 in) high. The plants are bright green, yellowish-green or bluish-green. The stems are branched but not in whorls, with the outer layer formed of small cells and the central strand prominent. The leaves are linear, subulate or serrated and the costa is strong, percurrent or short-excurrent. The upper cells are linear or rectangular, more elongated near the leaf base and pimply near the ends of the lumen. The capsules are erect or nearly erect, spherical to oblong, 1–2 mm (0.04–0.08 in) long. The peristome is often absent or reduced, sometimes single and the spores are nearly spherical, kidney-shaped or warty.

== Taxonomy and naming ==
The genus Bartramia was first formally described in 1801 by the German botanist Johann Hedwig and published in Species muscorum frondosorum. Hedwig only described two species, (B. halleriana and B. pomiformis but about 72 species are now recognised. The name Bartramia honours the pioneer American botanist John Bartram.

Species include:

- Bartramia alaris Dixon & Sainsbury
- Bartramia aprica Müll.Hal.
- Bartramia breutelii Müll.Hal.
- Bartramia brevifolia Brid.
- Bartramia halleriana Hedwig
- Bartramia hampeana Müll.Hal.
- Bartramia ithyphylla Brid.
- Bartramia mossmaniana Müll.Hal.
- Bartramia nothostricta Catches.
- Bartramia pomiformis Hedwig
- Bartramia potosica Mont.
- Bartramia pseudostricta Catches.
- Bartramia robusta Hook.f. & Wilson
- Bartramia strictifolia Taylor
- Bartramia subsymmetrica Cardot
- Bartramia subulata Bruch and A.Schimp.

== Distribution and habitat ==
Mosses in the genus Bartramia are found throughout the world but most often in temperate and mountainous areas, especially those with a humid climate. It is rarely found in arctic, alpine or arid areas and in the tropics it is usually only found at high altitudes. It often grows on shady rocks, on the northern side in the northern hemisphere, commonly near streams and waterfalls where the humidity is high.
