= Plagiopus (plant) =

Scientific classification
- Kingdom: Plantae
- Division: Bryophyta
- Class: Bryopsida
- Subclass: Bryidae
- Order: Bartramiales
- Family: Bartramiaceae
- Genus: Plagiopus; Brid.

Genus of mosses

Plagiopus is a genus of mosses belonging to the family Bartramiaceae.

The genus has cosmopolitan distribution.

Species:

- Plagiopus ithyphyllus (Brid.) Guim.
- Plagiopus javanicus (Dozy & Molk.) M.Fleisch.
