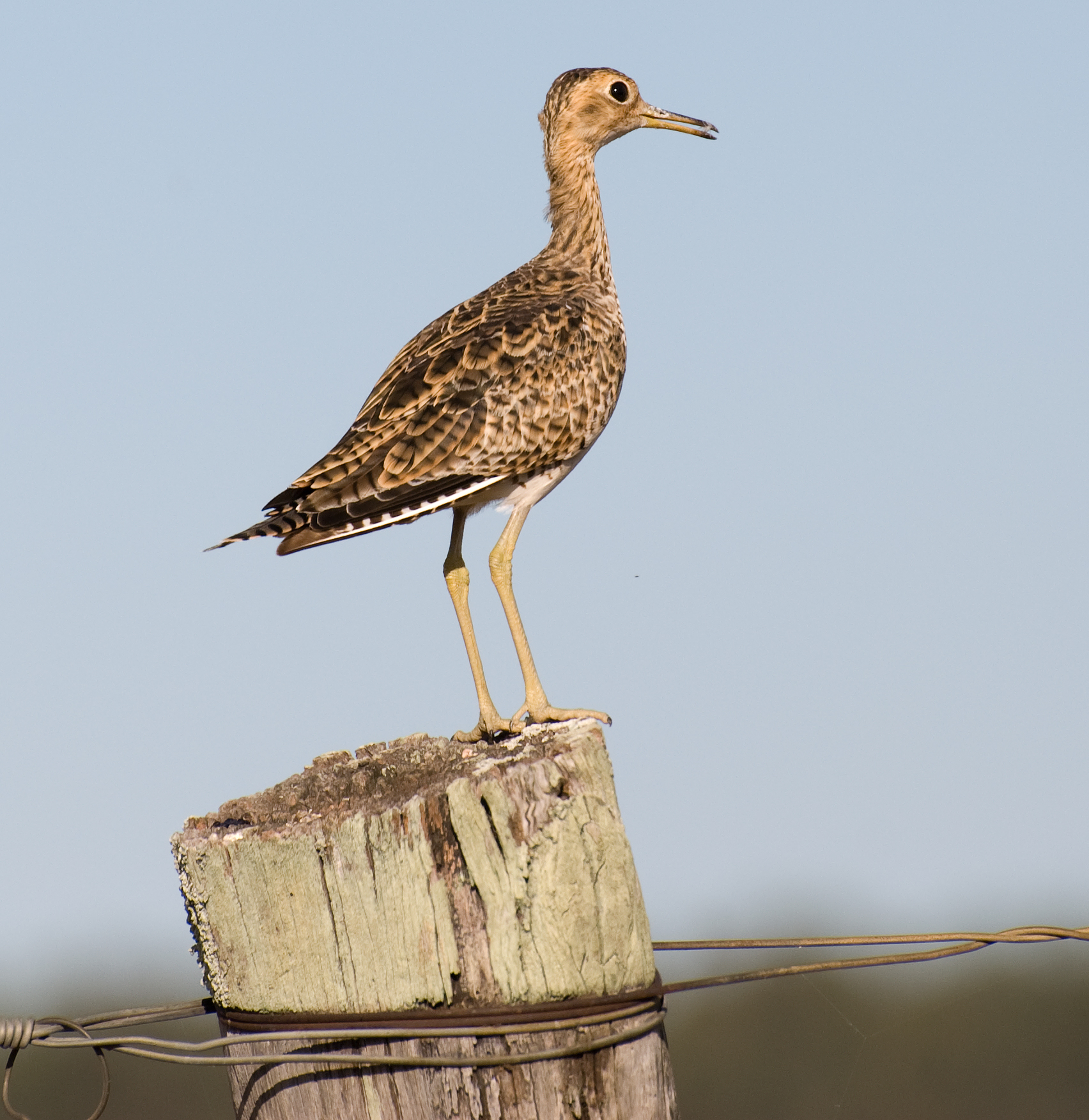
- Upland sandpiper (Bartramia longicauda)

Scientific classification
- Kingdom: Animalia
- Phylum: Chordata
- Class: Aves
- Order: Charadriiformes
- Family: Scolopacidae
- Subfamily: Tringinae
- Genus: Bartramia; Lesson, 1831

Species
- Bartramia longicauda; †Bartramia umatilla

= Bartramia (bird) =

Bartramia Temporal range: Pliocene - Recent

Genus of bird

Bartramia is a genus of bird containing two species, the extant upland sandpiper and the extinct Bartramia umatilla from the Middle Pliocene of Oregon.
