= David Catcheside =

British plant geneticist (1907–1994)

David Catcheside FRS
- Born: 31 May 1907; Hampshire, England
- Died: 1 June 1994 (aged 87); Harare, Zimbabwe
- Education: Strand School, King's College London
- Known for: Evidence of parasynapsis in Oenothera
- Scientific career
- Fields: Plant genetics
- Workplaces: King's College London, University of Cambridge, University of Adelaide, University of Birmingham, Australian National University

David Guthrie Catcheside FRS (31 May 1907 – 1 June 1994) was a British plant geneticist.

== Life ==
He was educated at Strand School and King's College London (BSc). He was a lecturer in botany at King's College London from 1933 to 1936, and at the University of Cambridge from 1937 to 1950. He was made a Fellow of the Royal Society in 1951. He was also a Fellow of King's College London and a Fellow of Trinity College, Cambridge. He was Professor of Genetics at the University of Adelaide from 1952 to 1955, Professor of Microbiology at the University of Birmingham from 1956 to 1964, and Professor of Genetics at the Australian National University from 1964 to 1972. He attempted to do research in what was then Rhodesia but was deported by the Ian Smith regime for supporting political rights for the indigenous black population. After independence, the new government of Zimbabwe invited him to return to the country and pursue his research in 1980. He moved to Zimbabwe in October 1980, and began researching plant genetics in the region of Mashonaland. He lived in Zimbabwe until his death of natural causes at his home in Harare in 1994.

== Studies ==
In 1931, David Catcheside proposed the idea that there is evidence of parasynapsis within Oenothera plants, based on their chromosomal arrangement.

== Recognition ==
He was elected an International Member of the U.S. National Academy of Sciences in 1974. The D.G. Catcheside Prize, awarded by the Genetics Society of Australia to the top doctoral student in the field of genetics, was named for him.

== Bibliography ==
- D. G. Catcheside MA, DSc, FAA, FRS (1980). Mosses of South Australia. Handbooks of the Flora and Fauna of South Australia. D. J. Woolman, Government Printer, South Australia.
