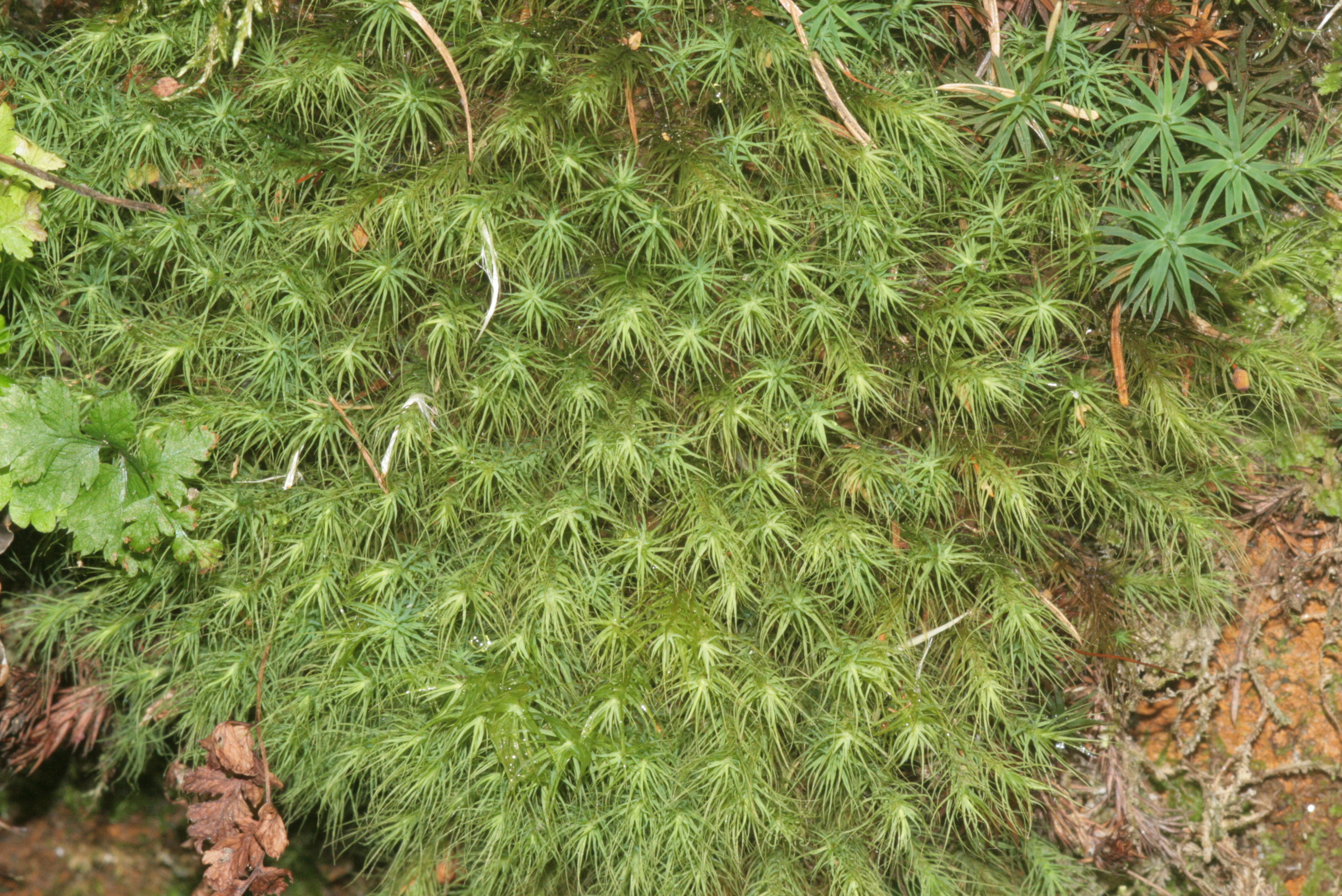
- Bartramia halleriana

Scientific classification
- Kingdom: Plantae
- Division: Bryophyta
- Class: Bryopsida
- Subclass: Bryidae
- Superorder: Bryanae
- Order: Bartramiales; D. Quandt, N.E. Bell & Stech

Families
- Bartramiaceae Schwägr., 1830

= Bartramiales =

Order of mosses

Bartramiales is an order of moss.

== Taxonomy ==
The order Bartramiales contains a single family with nine genera.

Family Bartramiaceae Schwägr.

- Anacolia Schimp.
- Bartramia Hedw.
- Breutelia (Bruch & Schimp.) Schimp.
- Conostomum Sw., Fleischerobryum Loeske
- Flowersia D. G. Griffin & W. R. Buck
- Leiomela (Mitt.) Broth.
- Neosharpiella H. Rob. & Delgad.
- Philonotis Brid.
- Plagiopus Brid.

== See also ==
- List of plant orders
