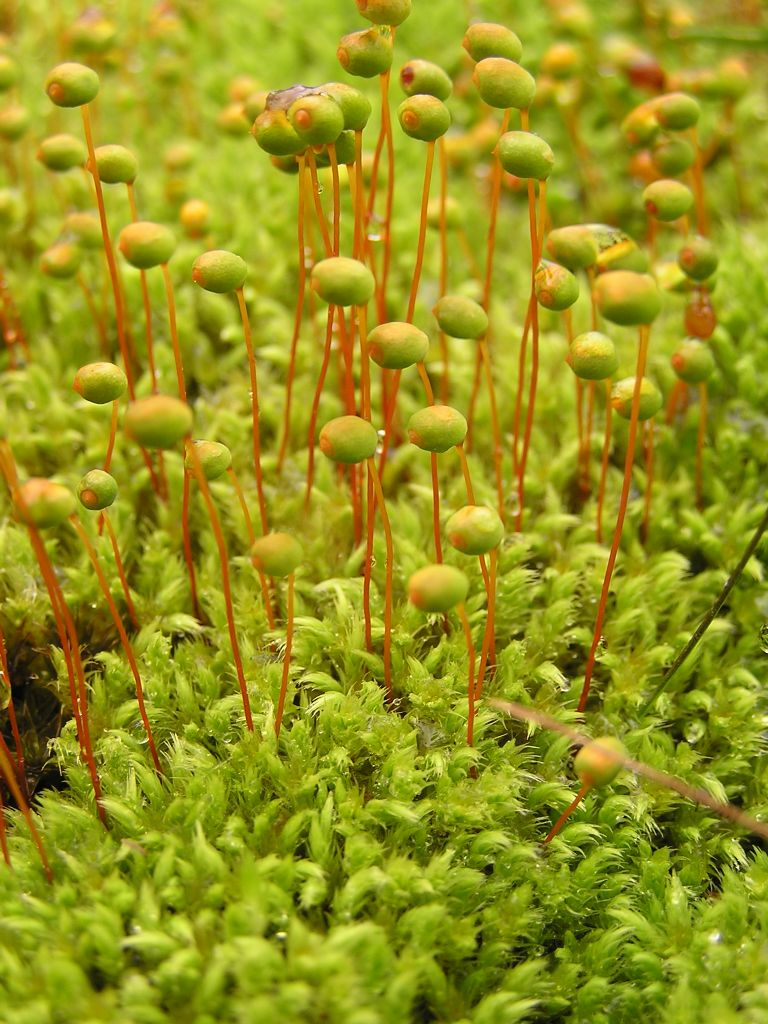
- Philonotis calcarea

Scientific classification
- Kingdom: Plantae
- Division: Bryophyta
- Class: Bryopsida
- Subclass: Bryidae
- Order: Bartramiales
- Family: Bartramiaceae; Schwägrichen

Genera
- See text

= Bartramiaceae =

Family of mosses

Bartramiaceae is a family of mosses belonging to the order Bartramiales.

== Genera ==
Genera:

- Anacolia Schimp.
- Bartramia Hedw.
- Bartramidula Bruch & Schimp.
- Breutelia (Bruch & Schimp.) Schimp.
- Conostomum Sw. ex F. Weber & D. Mohr
- Exodokidium Cardot
- Fleischerobryum Loeske
- Flowersia D.G. Griffin & W.R. Buck
- Glyphocarpa R. Br.
- Leiomela (Mitt.) Broth.
- Philonotis Brid.
- Philonotula Hampe
- †Plagiopodopsis E. Britton & Hollick
- Plagiopus Brid.
- Quathlamba Magill
