= Complex oil bodies =

Oil bodies of liverworts

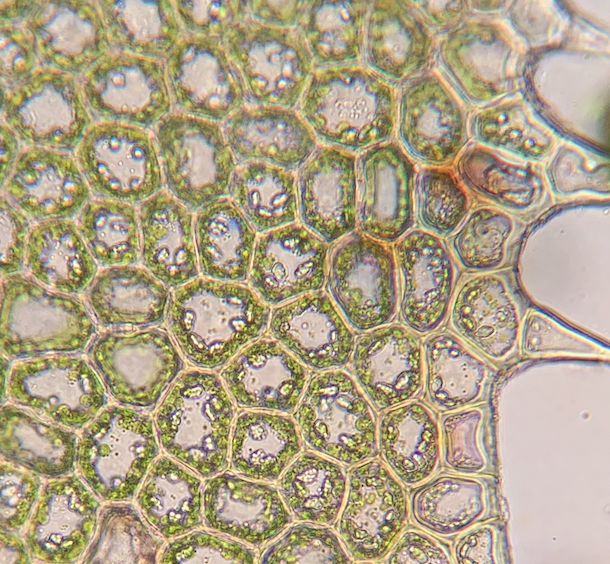
Complex oil bodies of Plagiochila asplenioides

The oil bodies of liverworts, occasionally dubbed complex oil bodies for distinction, are unique organelles exclusive to the Marchantiophyta. They are markedly different from the oil bodies found in other land plants and algae in that they are membrane-bound, and not associated with food storage. The organelles are variable and present in an estimated 90% of liverwort species, often proving taxonomically relevant. As a whole, the formation and function of the organelles are poorly understood. Complex oil bodies are recognized as sites of isoprenoid biosynthesis and essential oil accumulation, and have been implicated with anti-herbivory, desiccation tolerance, and photo-protection.

== Structure and content ==
The oil bodies of liverworts are recognizable using light microscopy, and they were first officially described in 1834 by Huebener from the plant Mylia taylorii. They were noted as transparent drops, with a shining, membranous texture. They are secretory organelles bound by a single membrane, containing lipophilic globules in a proteinaceous matrix of high refractive index. They are quite variable in size, number, shape, colour, and content between liverwort species. They may appear rounded, globular, homogenous, segmented, clear or tinted.

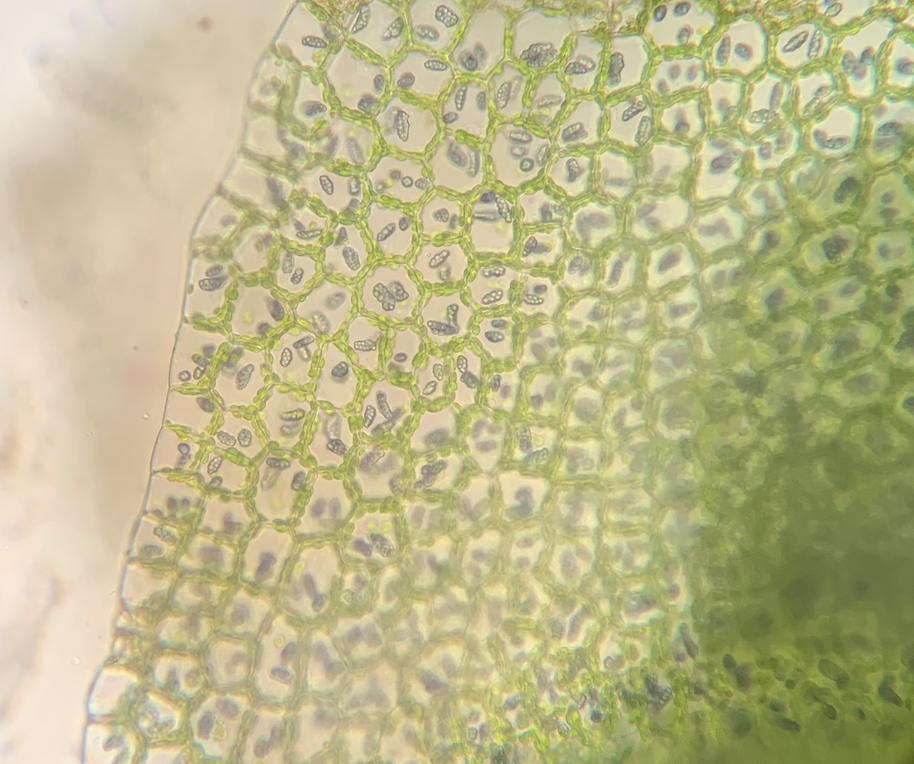
Distinct blue complex oil bodies of Calypogeia azurea.

The lipophilic globules within have been identified as the main site of lipids in liverwort cells, and have long been associated with liverwort's often prominent essential oils. A visually striking example of this association can be seen in the distinctly blue oil bodies of Calypogeia azurea, found to be due to the localized accumulation of azulene derivatives. Another early empirical argument for the association of essential oils and complex oil bodies was based upon the dark indophenol blue staining of Radula complanata oil bodies; Indophenol blue dissolves in essential oils and appears dark blue, but appear light pink in unsaturated lipids like those found in the cytoplasmic oil droplets of R. complanata. This was later corroborated by chemical analyses which found the primary constituent of R. complanata oil bodies to be the aromatic 3-methoxy-biphenyl. The association between oil bodies and essential oils is not consistent; While Blasia pusilla lacks both oil bodies and terpenoids, Anthelia julacea lacks oil bodies but retains terpenoids and aromatic compounds. Although present in some species lacking complex oil bodies, the association with terpenoids is furthered by evidence based upon enzyme localization in Marchantia polymorpha indicating that oil bodies are sites of isoprenoid synthesis in liverworts. The localization of sesquiterpenes and Marchantin A to the oil body has since been confirmed in Marchantia polymorpha based upon the micromanipulation of oil cell contents using glass capillaries and piston syringes. Chemical analyses on hundreds of liverwort species have revealed highly diverse mixtures of aromatic and terpenoid compounds, likely associated with oil bodies.

The essential oils of liverworts are largely composed of sesquiterpenes as well as diterpenes, and more than 3000 terpenoid and aromatic compounds have been reported from the group. Monoterpenes are also present, and have been associated with the sometimes distinctive odours of some species. For example: Chiloscyphus species have been noted to have a strong mossy smell, Jungermannia, Frullania, and Geocalyx species smell of turpentine, and Lophozia vicernata is likened to cedar oil, Moerkia species are intensely unpleasant, Conocephalum species are pungent and mushroomy, Pellia endiviifolia shares qualities with dried seaweed, and Riella species with anise. Interestingly, it has been observed that most sesqui- and diterpenoids in liverworts are enantiomers of those found in vascular plants, although there are numerous only found in liverworts. Pinguisane- and sacculatane-type diterpenes are exclusively found in liverworts, detected in the genera Porella, Pellia, Pallavicini, Fossombronia and Trichocoleopsis.

The secondary metabolites of liverworts offer an under-characterised diversity of potentially pharmaceutically relevant compounds. Liverwort terpenoids and lipophilic compounds have been observed to have significant biological activity, including cyto-toxicity, anti-obesity, anti-influenza, allergenic contact dermatitis, anti-HIV inhibitory, antimicrobial, and vasorelaxant effects. Compounds such as Marchantin and Riccardin as well as extracts from Bazzania and Scapania species have been shown to have pronounced antitumour effects.

Indeed, liverworts have been used medicinally by humans for centuries. In China, liverworts have been used for a variety of ailments including cuts, burns and bruises, pulmonary tuberculosis, convulsions and neurasthenia. Pellia neesiana has been used in a traditional medicine by Hesquiat people for children's sore mouths, and Conocephalum salebrosum has been used as an eye medicine by the Ditidaht. Various liverworts have been incorporated by Maori in traditional medicine.

== Ontogeny ==
Although a synapomorphy for the phylum, the ontogeny of complex oil bodies across liverworts remains uncertain. Uncertainty arises as to the conservation of development between the Marchantiopsida and Jungermanniopsida. Working with light and electron microscopy, the oil bodies of various Jungermanniopsida species were observed to be derived from dilations of endoplasmic reticulum cisternae. In certain Marchantiopsida species, again based upon light and electron microscopy, oil bodies were hypothesized to result from the fusion of golgi-associated vesicles. When re-examined independently in Marchantia polymorpha and Lunularia cruciata, this hypothesis was refuted in favour of that which unifies the development of all liverwort oil bodies from ER cisternae. Recent molecular work in Marchantia polymorpha has however once again supported the fusion of vesicles, and oscillating phases of secretory pathway redirection to the plasma membrane and oil body were hypothesized. Developmentally, the spatial distribution of oil body cells has been proposed to be controlled by a lateral inhibition mechanism, explaining the regularity of oil body cell patterns in diverse liverwort lineages.

== Function ==
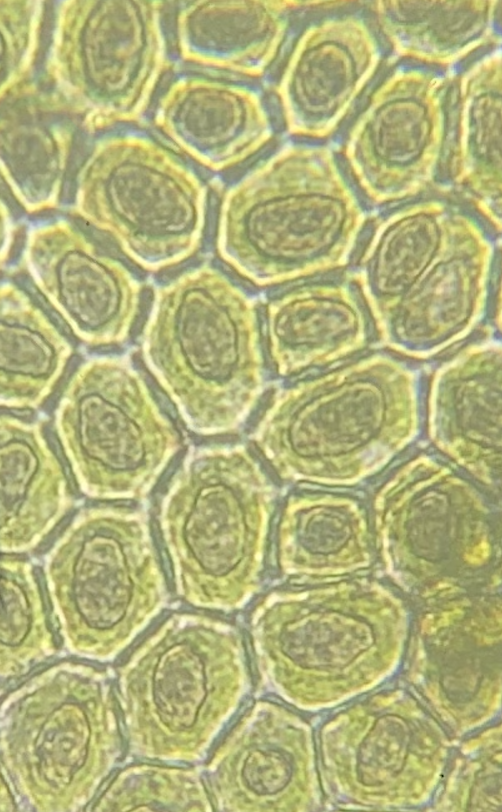
Radula complanata laminal cells, bearing 1-2 large tinted oil-bodies.

Numerous functions for the organelles have been hypothesized, including that the organelles may be largely vestigial. Although lost in numerous taxa, the predominant retention and diversity of the organelles suggests an adaptive role, and their importance is quite evident. Theory over the years has implicated complex oil bodies with virtually all evident stressors, such as herbivore and pathogen damage, thermal stress, excessive light/UV irradiation, and desiccation. Empirical evidence is often lacking, however many of these theories have been supported in one way or another. Worth noting is that the modern adaptive function of complex oil bodies may be diverse across the phylum and inconsistent between species. For example, it was found that oil bodies in Southbya nigrella likely served a role is desiccation-tolerance, however xeric Riccia species and highly exposed Anthelia have no oil bodies at all. In Southbya nigrella, the mechanism was attributed to carbohydrates and other molecules whose osmoticum resists water loss, inferred to be contained in the oil bodies and noted due to the oil body collapse upon rehydration. A hypothesized ancestral function has been that of UV tolerance. It has been noted that liverworts produce a high amount of constitutive and inducible UV-absorbing compounds, much greater than mosses, however the localization of these compounds to complex oil bodies has not been confirmed. As liverworts are often considered the closest extant relative of one of the earliest groups of land plants, they would likely have been required to be adapted to the harsh conditions of a thinner ozone layer, thus the development of these UV-shielding compounds may reflect a key development in the evolution of land plants.

Studies on herbivore grazing are few but supportive of the hypothesis that oil-bodies can function as herbivore-deterrents. Fossil evidence of herbivore damage on the middle Devonian liverwort Metzgeriothallus sharonae suggests an already deterrent role of the oil-bodies, whereby cells presumed to be oil-cells were preferentially avoided. In an early feeding experiment using various liverworts and several species of snail, it was noted that liverworts leached by alcohol were far more palatable, with fresh liverworts often being seldom touched. Recently, a mutant of Marchantia polymorpha lacking oil-bodies was studied for palatability to herbivores, and it was found that a loss of the organelles was associated with far greater grazing by pill-bugs. In general, herbivore grazing on extant liverworts seems to be quite low, and this is likely not due to an un-worthwhile caloric content but the secondary metabolites likely stored in the oil bodies of the plants. In vitro studies on the effects of various liverwort extracts have further demonstrated broad feeding-deterrence as well as insecticidal and nematicidal properties.

Although noted that liverwort colonies are seldom damaged by fungal or bacterial pathogens, empirical evidence of oil-bodies protecting against invasion is lacking. Extracts from a range of liverwort taxa demonstrate pronounced and diverse antifungal and antibacterial properties. Fungal endophytes however are not uncommon among liverwort taxa, and the fungal invasion of liverworts in the family Arnelliaceae has been associated with a rapid breakdown of oil bodies.

== Taxonomic importance ==
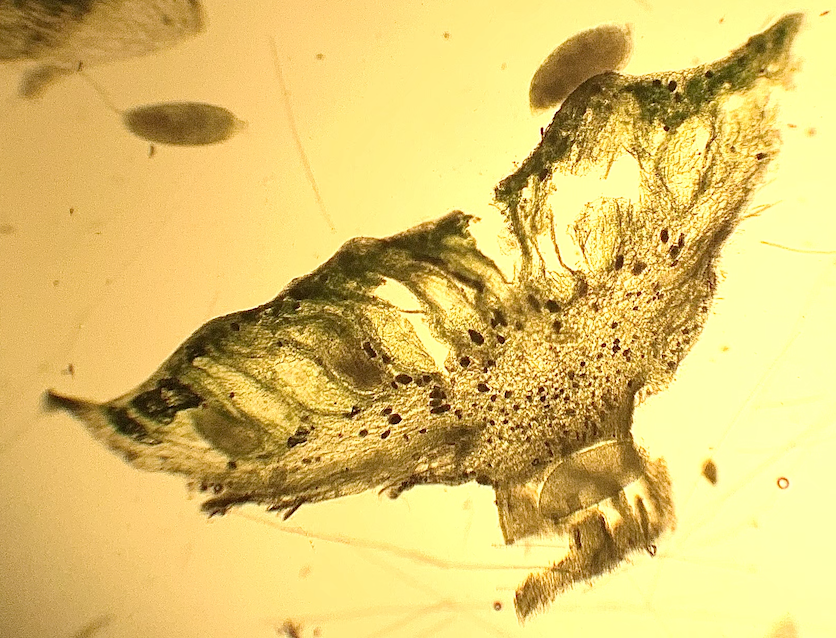
Marchantia polymorpha antheridiophore with dark ocelli.

Complex oil bodies are often the most conspicuous features of liverwort cells in light microscopy, and as variable as they are in number, shape, colour, and homogeneity, they have long been recognized as taxonomically relevant. Unfortunately, this is a character that requires observation in fresh material, as under unnaturally high rates of drying the complex oil bodies disintegrate. Worth noting is that under natural rates of desiccation the oil bodies seem to retain their original structure. Various classifications for oil body types have been proposed based upon their high variability, and they have been used extensively to distinguish between families, genera and species. Chemotaxonomics based on the putative oil-body contents has also proved valuable.

Although some families such as Blasiaceae, Metzgeriaceae, Cephaloziaceae, Lepidoziaceae, and Antheliaceae lack complex oil bodies, they are broadly present in all mature gametophytic and sporophytic cells in the Jungermanniopsida and Haplomitriales, and restricted to specialized oil-cells sometimes denoted as ocelli in the Marchantiopsida and Treubiales. Phylogenetic evidence does not indicate an evident ancestral form of the complex oil bodies as the basal Haplomitriopsida lineages Treubia and Haplomitrium display two different types of oil bodies. Fossil evidence has suggested that Paleozoic liverwort oil bodies are homologous to the specialized oil-cells found in extant taxa, perhaps indicating the more ancestral type.
