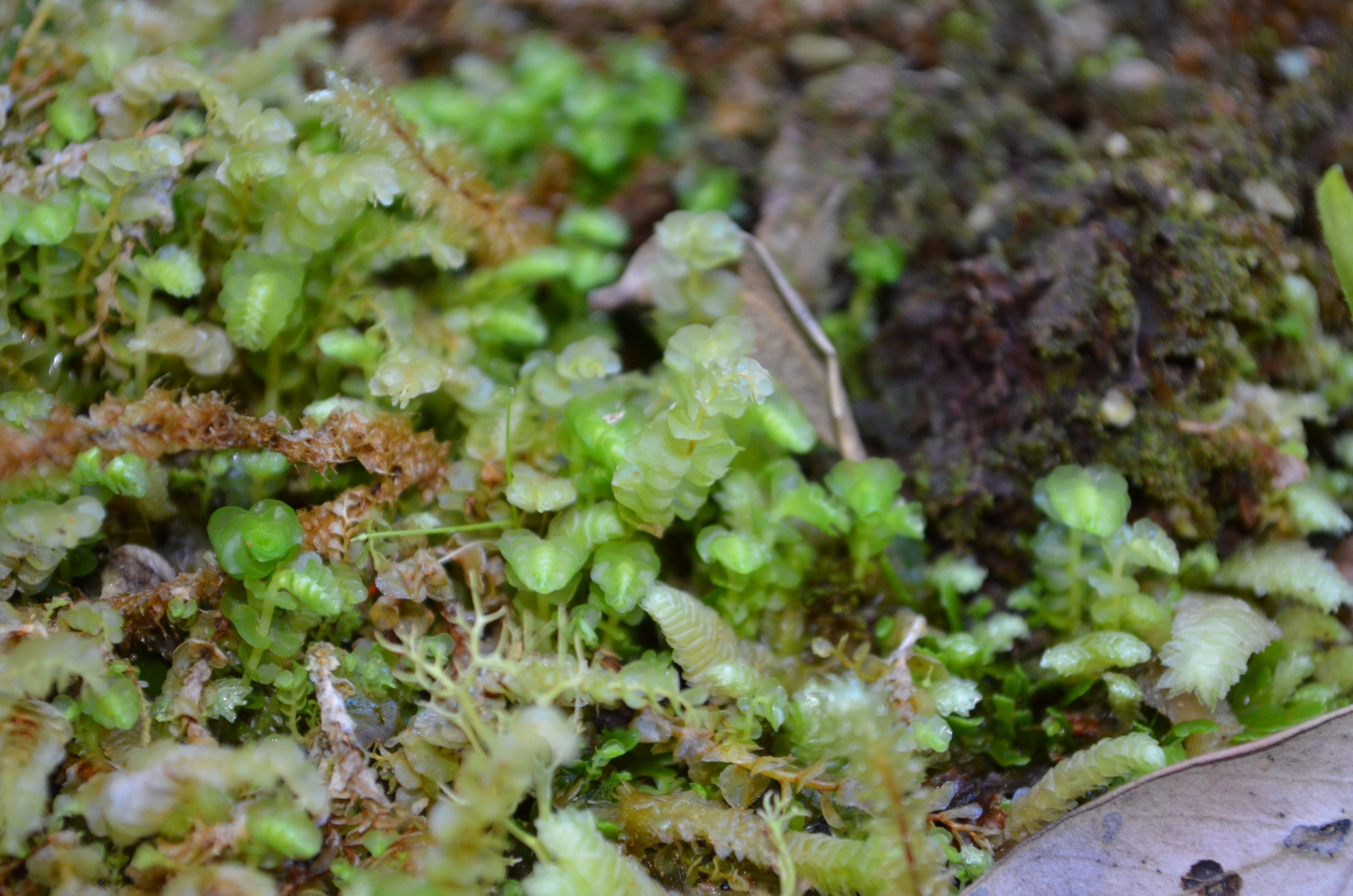

Scientific classification
- Kingdom: Plantae
- Division: Marchantiophyta
- Class: Jungermanniopsida
- Order: Jungermanniales
- Family: Acrobolbaceae
- Genus: Acrobolbus
- Species: A. pseudosaccatus

Binomial name
- Acrobolbus pseudosaccatus (Grolle) Briscoe

Synonyms
- Tylimanthus pseudosaccatus Grolle

= Acrobolbus pseudosaccatus =

Species of liverwort

Acrobolbus pseudosaccatus, synonym Tylimanthus pseudosaccatus, is a bryophyte, a species from the liverwort family Acrobolbaceae. The family grows on logs, rocks, and soil. Under certain circumstances, however, they are epiphyte, growing on other plant species.

== Description ==
The leaves of Acrobolbus pseudosaccatus have a shallow depression at the tip, and the margin is finely toothed. The leaves are very fine and are translucent green. Plants are also robust in size. The finely toothed margins distinguish TylimaAcrobolbusnthus pseudosaccatus from other members in the Acrobolbaceae family. The most distinctive feature, however, is the reproductive structure. The position of the reproductive structures most accurately distinguishes Acrobolbus pseudosaccatus from any other species. The sporophyte (reproductive structure) develops in a pouch at the shoot apex structure.

== Taxonomy ==
The species was first described in 1963, as Tylimanthus pseudosaccatus. The genus Tylimanthus was later synonymized with Acrobolbus, and Tylimanthus pseudosaccatus was transferred as Acrobolbus pseudosaccatus in 2015.

== Distribution and habitat ==
Acrobolbus pseudosaccatus is located in the Southern Hemisphere, found in Australia. They are endemic to south-east Australia in New South Wales, Victoria, and Tasmania. Their habitat requirement consists of environments which retain moisture. Mostly in forests, wet sclerophyll forests or they could also be found in rainforests. The liverworts are found in environments which are either middle-aged or old-growth forests, as these provide the bryophytes with protection.

Liverworts are significant in their habitats as their presence in an environment offers microhabitats. The importance of the microhabitats is that it creates an environment which is essential for the survival of other organisms. These organisms include protozoa, invertebrates, and eukaryotes. The reasoning for why they create important microhabitats is due to bryophytes been nitrogen fixers. Other organisms depend on nitrogen as it allows for those species to grow and develop, overall improving the quality of the soil.
