= Endogemma =

Scientific classification
- Kingdom: Plantae
- Division: Marchantiophyta
- Class: Jungermanniopsida
- Order: Jungermanniales
- Family: Endogemmataceae; Konstant., Vilnet & A.V.Troitsky
- Genus: Endogemma; Konstant., Vilnet & A.V.Troitsky
- Species: E. caespiticia

Binomial name
- Endogemma caespiticia (Lindenb.) Konstant., Vilnet & A.V.Troitsky

Synonyms
- Aplozia caespiticia (Lindenb.) Dumort.; Haplozia caespiticia (Lindenb.) Dumort.; Haplozia caespiticia (Lindenb.) Müll.Frib.; Jungermannia punctata Gottsche

Genus of liverworts

Endogemma is a monotypic genus of liverworts belonging to the family Endogemmataceae and subclass of Jungermanniineae.

The genera Endogemma and fellow Jungermanniineae subclass genus Solenostoma was also accepted by Borovichev 2014, and Konstantinova & Lapshina 2014.

The only known species is Endogemma caespiticia (Lindenb.) Konstant., Vilnet & A.V.Troitsky.

The family Endogemmataceae, the genus Endogemma and the lone species Endogemma caespiticia were all published by Konstant., Vilnet et A.V.Troitsky in Folia Cryptog. Estonica 48: 132 in 2011.

It has the beaked perianth mouth of Solenostoma and a lack of perigynium and shoot calyptra as in Jungermannia species. It differs from similar Solenostomataceae and Jungermanniaceae species in having endogenous gemmae and in a characteristic large, single oil-body otherwise only known for Solenostoma tetragonum (Lindenberg) R. M. Schuster.

The name Endogemma is derived from endogenous (originate from within a living system) and gemmae (single cell, or a mass of cells in asexual reproduction). This is a very rare feature in hepatic plants. The species epithet of caespiticia is derived from caespiticius meaning made of turf.

It is commonly known as the delicate flapwort, or carpet-like flapwort.

== Description ==
Endogemma caespiticia has obliquely, or sub-transversely (at angles of 30–70°) inserted leaves, that un-lobed and rounded. They are 0.5–1.1 mm (0.020 in – 0.043 in) wide and 2–3 mm (0.079 in – 0.118 in) long but very rarely up to 5 mm long. It has a creeping to ascending form, with endogenous gemmae concentrated in unfertilized perianths (flower parts). The plants are pale brownish, whitish to yellowish, without red or purple pigmentation (as exception that pigmentation present in perianth plicae (fold). The stem is 200–300 μm (micrometre) wide with lateral branching, mainly below gemmae tips or perianths. The dorsal surface cells are thin-walled, with indistinct trigones which are 70–240 by 28–50 μm in size. Rhizoids (protuberances that extend from the lower epidermal cells) are dense to scattered and colour-less to brownish in shade. They are in indistinct obliquely spreading fascicles commonly closely attaching plant to the substratum or soils. The cells in the midleaf, are thin-walled, from (rarely) 28 × 28 μm up to 47–90 × 42–65 μm in size. The cells near the margins (of the leaf) are 40–70 (–100) μm in size. They are thin-walled, but sometimes with a thickened external wall. The trigones (one of the thickenings of the cell wall at the angles where several cells join) are concave, with a cuticle smooth throughout. There are oil bodies in almost all of the leaf cells, 1 or 2 per cell. They are grayish to brownish (in shade) and are coarsely granulate and nearly filling the cell lumen. The gemmae are ovoid or ellipsoidal shaped, orbicular to shortly elliptic (in shape), and irregularly tetragonal (7 sided) in projection. They are about 8.4–14.0 × 7.0–10 μm in size. They are 2 celled at leaf tips or margins. They are found within unfertilized perianth. The sexual condition is dioicous. The perianth is present, without perigynium (sac) or shoot calyptra (lid).

== Distribution ==
They are a boreal sub-circumpolar species. It is native to Eurasia and Northern America. It is widespread in northern Europe. It has been recorded in all administrative sub-units of the Russian Far East (although it is very rare in altitudes northward of 60°N). In adjacent Siberia, it is distributed disjunctively and also known from Western and Southern Siberia and the Republic of Yakutiya. On the North American side, it seems to be quite rare and is recorded only in British Columbia and Alaska and also eastward also known from rather isolated locality near New York.

== Habitat ==
It is an Acido- to neutrophilic mesophyte. It has a preference to grow in man-made mesic habitats, such as near roadsides and waste lands. The taxon also prefers habitats with anthropogenic disturbed vegetation. Such as on claylike soil along roadsides and on stream banks in coniferous forest belt, rarely ascending to alpine forests and mountain tundra or occurring within the tundra zone. In the Russian Far East, it occurs mostly below 500 m a.s.l., with rare exceptions confined to anthropogenically modified habitats such as in Iturup Island (1020 m a.s.l.), where it occurs along old roadside and also Central Kamchatka, where it grows along stream banks and near roads. Including being found in France (within a disused China-clay mine).
