= Acrobolbus epiphytus =

Scientific classification
- Kingdom: Plantae
- Division: Marchantiophyta
- Class: Jungermanniopsida
- Order: Jungermanniales
- Family: Acrobolbaceae
- Genus: Acrobolbus
- Species: A. epiphytus

Binomial name
- Acrobolbus epiphytus (Colenso) Briscoe

Synonyms
- Marsupidium epiphytum Colenso

Species of liverwort

Acrobolbus epiphytus is a liverwort species in the genus Acrobolbus. It occurs in New Zealand.

Prenylated bibenzyls can be isolated from A. epiphytus.
