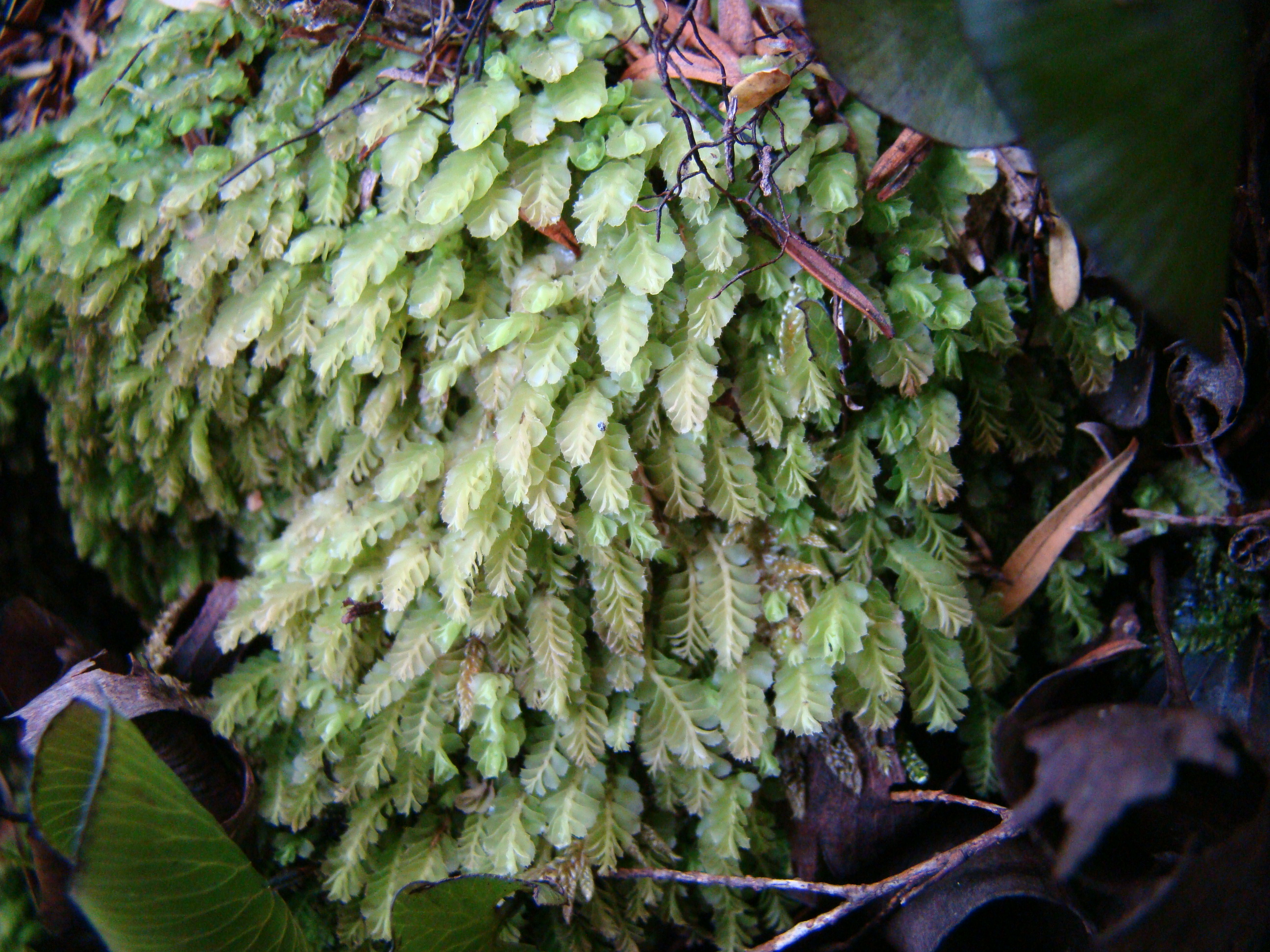
- Acrobolbus knightii

Scientific classification
- Kingdom: Plantae
- Division: Marchantiophyta
- Class: Jungermanniopsida
- Order: Jungermanniales
- Family: Acrobolbaceae; R.M.Schust. ex Briscoe
- Genus: Acrobolbus; Nees

Species
- See text

Synonyms
- Gymnanthe Taylor; Hypogastranthus Schiffn.; Marsupellopsis (Schiffn.) Berggr.; Marsupidium Mitt.; Tylimanthus Mitt.

= Acrobolbus =

Genus of liverworts

Acrobolbus, synonyms including Marsupidium, is a liverwort genus in the family Acrobolbaceae.

== Species ==
As of April 2024 the Global Biodiversity Information Facility listed the following species:

- Acrobolbus africanus (Pearson) Briscoe
- Acrobolbus anisodontus (Hook.f. & Taylor) Briscoe
- Acrobolbus antillanus R.M.Schust.
- Acrobolbus azoricus (Grolle & Perss.) Briscoe
- Acrobolbus ciliatus (Mitt.) Schiffn.
- Acrobolbus cinerascens (Lehm. & Lindenb.) Bastow
- Acrobolbus concinnus (Mitt.) Steph.
- Acrobolbus cuneifolius (Steph.) Briscoe
- Acrobolbus epiphytus (Colenso) Briscoe
- Acrobolbus flavicans (J.J.Engel & Grolle) Briscoe & J.J.Engel
- Acrobolbus gradsteinii (Grolle) Briscoe
- Acrobolbus integrifolius (A.Evans) Briscoe
- Acrobolbus knightii (Mitt.) Briscoe
- Acrobolbus kunkelii (Hässel & Solari) Briscoe & J.J.Engel
- Acrobolbus laxus (Lehm. & Lindenb.) Briscoe
- Acrobolbus limbatus (Steph.) Briscoe & J.J.Engel
- Acrobolbus lophocoleoides (Mitt.) Mitt.
- Acrobolbus madeirensis (Grolle & Perss.) Briscoe
- Acrobolbus mashpianus Burghardt
- Acrobolbus ochrophyllus (Hook.f. & Taylor) R.M.Schust.
- Acrobolbus papillosus (J.J.Engel & Glenny) Briscoe
- Acrobolbus perpusillus (Colenso) Briscoe
- Acrobolbus plagiochiloides (J.J.Engel & Glenny) Briscoe
- Acrobolbus pseudosaccatus (Grolle) Briscoe
- Acrobolbus renifolius (Hässel & Solari) Briscoe & J.J.Engel
- Acrobolbus ruwenzorensis (S.W.Arnell) Briscoe
- Acrobolbus saccatus (Hook.) Trevis.
- Acrobolbus setaceus (Steph.) Gradst.
- Acrobolbus setulosus (Mitt.) Briscoe
- Acrobolbus spinifolius R.M.Schust.
- Acrobolbus sumatranus (Schiffn.) Briscoe
- Acrobolbus surculosus (Nees) Trevis.
- Acrobolbus tenellus (Taylor ex Lehm.) Trevis.
- Acrobolbus urvilleanus (Mont.) Trevis.
- Acrobolbus viridis (Mitt.) Briscoe & J.J.Engel
- Acrobolbus wilsonii Nees
