= Arctoscyphus =

Scientific classification
- Kingdom: Plantae
- Division: Marchantiophyta
- Class: Jungermanniopsida
- Order: Jungermanniales
- Family: Solenostomataceae
- Genus: Arctoscyphus; Hässel

Genus of liverworts

Arctoscyphus is a genus of liverworts belonging to the family Solenostomataceae.

The species of this genus are found in southernmost America.

Species:

- Arctoscyphus fuegiensis (C.Massal.) Hässel
- Arctoscyphus ronsmithii Hässel
