= Cryptocolea =

Scientific classification
- Kingdom: Plantae
- Division: Marchantiophyta
- Class: Jungermanniopsida
- Order: Jungermanniales
- Family: Southbyaceae
- Genus: Cryptocolea; R.M.Schust.

Genus of liverworts

Cryptocolea is a monotypic genus of liverworts belonging to the family Solenostomataceae.

The sole species of this genus, Cryptocolea imbricata R.M.Schust. is found mostly in subarctic regions.
