= Diplocolea =

Conservation status
- Endangered (IUCN 3.1)

Scientific classification
- Kingdom: Plantae
- Division: Marchantiophyta
- Class: Jungermanniopsida
- Order: Jungermanniales
- Family: Solenostomataceae
- Genus: Diplocolea; Amakawa
- Species: D. sikkimensis

Binomial name
- Diplocolea sikkimensis Amakawa

Genus of liverworts

Diplocolea is a monotypic genus of liverworts belonging to the family Solenostomataceae. The only species is Diplocolea sikkimensis. It is found in the eastern Himalayas in India and Nepal. The species is endangered, and is threatened by habitat loss.
