= Archeophylla paradoxa =

Scientific classification
- Kingdom: Plantae
- Division: Marchantiophyta
- Class: Jungermanniopsida
- Order: Lepidoziales
- Family: Pseudolepicoleaceae
- Genus: Archeophylla
- Species: A. paradoxa

Binomial name
- Archeophylla paradoxa R.M.Schust.

Species of plant

Archeophylla paradoxa is a liverwort in the family Pseudolepicoleaceae.
