= Archeophylla =

Scientific classification
- Kingdom: Plantae
- Clade: Embryophytes
- Division: Marchantiophyta
- Class: Jungermanniopsida
- Order: Lepidoziales
- Family: Pseudolepicoleaceae
- Genus: Archeophylla; R.M.Schust.

Genus of plants

Archeophylla is a genus of liverworts belonging to the family Pseudolepicoleaceae.

The species of this genus are found in New Zealand and Southern America.

Species:

- Archeophylla paradoxa R.M.Schust.
- Archeophylla pungens (Herzog) R.M.Schust.
- Archeophylla schusteri (E.A.Hodgs. & Allison) R.M.Schust.
