= Herzogiaria =

Scientific classification
- Kingdom: Plantae
- Division: Marchantiophyta
- Class: Jungermanniopsida
- Order: Lepidoziales
- Family: Pseudolepicoleaceae
- Genus: Herzogiaria; Fulford ex Hässel

Genus of liverworts

Herzogiaria is a genus of liverworts belonging to the family Pseudolepicoleaceae.

The genus name of Herzogiaria is in honour of Theodor Carl Julius Herzog (1880– 1961), who was a German bryologist and phytogeographer.

The genus was circumscribed by Margaret Hannah Fulford and Gabriela Hässel de Menéndez in Nova Hedwigia vol.1 on page 398 in 402 in 1960 and then in Lindbergia vol.7 on page 23 in 1981.

The species of this genus are found in Southernmost America.

One species is known, Herzogiaria teres (Steph.) Fulford ex Hässel
