= Pseudolepicolea =

Scientific classification
- Kingdom: Plantae
- Division: Marchantiophyta
- Class: Jungermanniopsida
- Order: Lepidoziales
- Family: Pseudolepicoleaceae
- Genus: Pseudolepicolea; Fulford & J.Taylor

Synonyms
- Archeochaete Schuster 1963; Lophochaete Schuster 1961

Genus of plants

Pseudolepicolea is a genus of liverworts belonging to the family Pseudolepicoleaceae.

The species of this genus are only found in the very southern parts of southern America, eastern Asia (including Japan) and parts of northern America, (including Canada,).

== Species ==
As accepted by GBIF;

- Pseudolepicolea andoi (R.M.Schust.) Inoue
- Pseudolepicolea fryei (Perss.) Grolle & Ando
- Pseudolepicolea georgica Fulford & J.Taylor
- Pseudolepicolea grolleana (R.M.Schust.) Grolle
- Pseudolepicolea kuehnemannii (R.M.Schust.) Hässel
- Pseudolepicolea quadrilaciniata (Sull.) Fulford & J.Taylor
- Pseudolepicolea temnomoides (R.M.Schust.) Váňa & J.J.Engel
- Pseudolepicolea trollii (Herzog) Grolle & Ando

Pseudolepicolea fryei is known as 'Frye's Alaskan Threadwort'.
