= Chaetocolea =

Scientific classification
- Kingdom: Plantae
- Division: Marchantiophyta
- Class: Jungermanniopsida
- Order: Lepidoziales
- Family: Pseudolepicoleaceae
- Genus: Chaetocolea; Spruce

Genus of liverworts

Chaetocolea is a monotypic genus of liverworts belonging to the family Pseudolepicoleaceae.

The sole species of this genus, Chaetocolea palmata Spruce is only found in Southern America.
