= Castanoclobos =

Scientific classification
- Kingdom: Plantae
- Division: Marchantiophyta
- Class: Jungermanniopsida
- Order: Lepidoziales
- Family: Pseudolepicoleaceae
- Genus: Castanoclobos; J.J.Engel & Glenny
- Species: C. julaceus

Binomial name
- Castanoclobos julaceus (Hatcher ex J.J.Engel) J.J.Engel & Glenny

Synonyms
- Castanoclobus J.J.Engel & Glenny

Genus of plants

Castanoclobos is a monotypic genus of liverworts belonging to the family Pseudolepicoleaceae.

The sole species of this genus, Castanoclobos julaceus is only found in Australia and New Zealand.

It was originally placed in the Trichocoleaceae family before moving to Pseudolepicoleaceae family.
