= Isophyllaria =

Scientific classification
- Kingdom: Plantae
- Division: Marchantiophyta
- Class: Jungermanniopsida
- Order: Lepidoziales
- Family: Pseudolepicoleaceae
- Genus: Isophyllaria; E.A.Hodgs. & Allison

Synonyms
- Flufordiella Hässel

Genus of plants

Isophyllaria is a genus of liverworts belonging to the family Pseudolepicoleaceae.

The species of this genus are found in Australia and New Zealand.

Species:

- Isophyllaria attenuata (Rodway) E.A.Hodgs.
- Isophyllaria fuegiana (Hässel) R.M.Schust.
