= Leptomorphus =

Scientific classification
- Domain: Eukaryota
- Kingdom: Animalia
- Phylum: Arthropoda
- Class: Insecta
- Order: Diptera
- Family: Mycetophilidae
- Subfamily: Sciophilinae
- Genus: Leptomorphus; Curtis, 1831

Type species
- Leptomorphus walkeri Curtis, 1831

Genus of flies

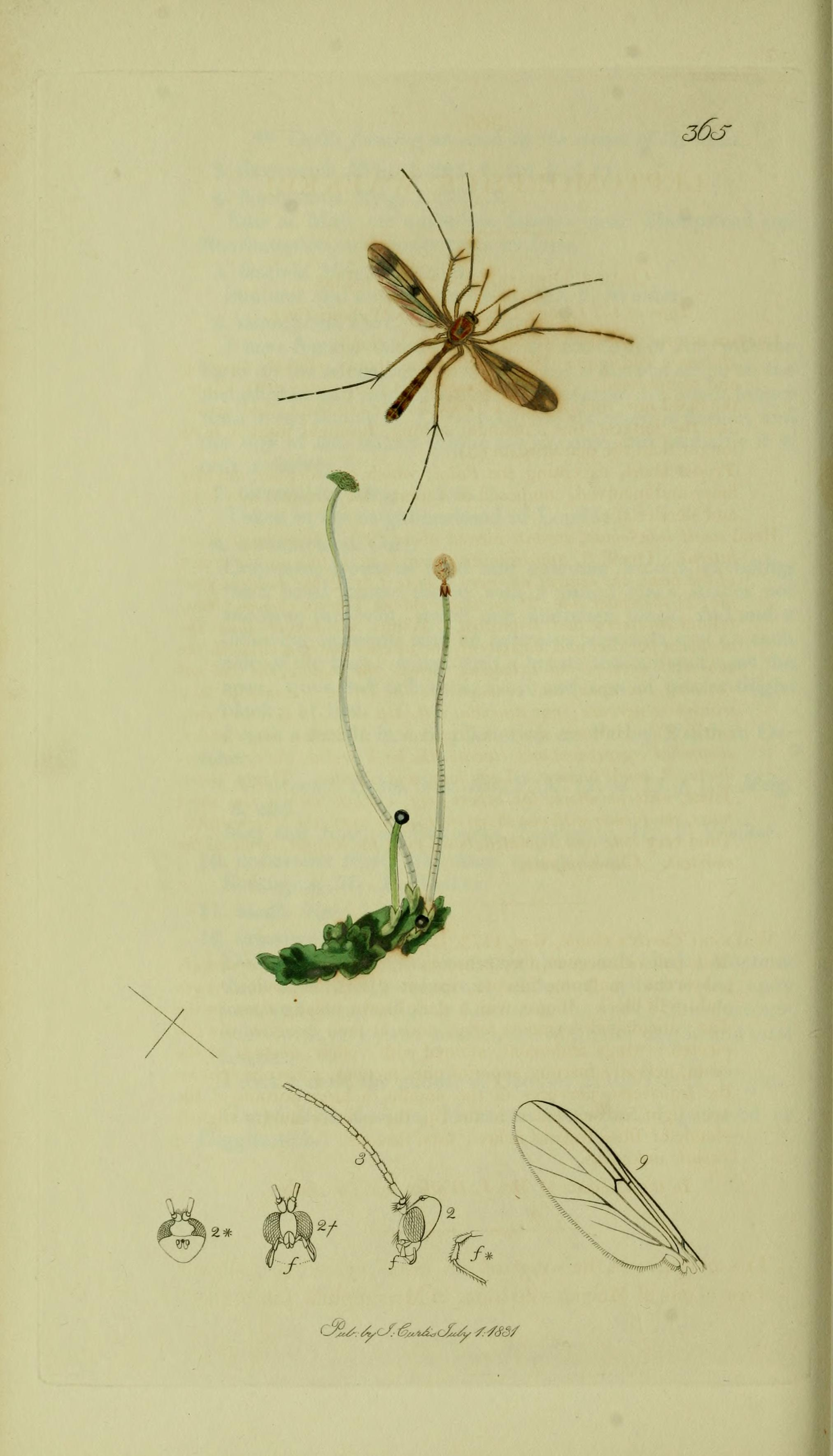
Southgate crane-fly (Leptomorphus walkeri) and liverwort Jungermannia epiphylla

Leptomorphus is a genus of fungus gnats in the family Mycetophilidae.

== Species ==
- L. africanus Matile, 1977
- L. aliciae Matile, 1977
- L. alienus Papp & Sevcik, 2011
- L. ascutellatus Papp & Sevcik, 2011
- L. baramensis Papp & Sevcik, 2011
- L. bifasciatus (Say, 1824)
- L. carnevalei Matile, 1977
- L. couturieri Matile, 1997
- L. crosskeyi Matile, 1997
- L. elegans Matile, 1997
- L. gracilis Matile, 1977
- L. grjebinei Matile, 1977
- L. gunungmuluensis Papp & Sevcik, 2011
- L. gurneyi Shaw, 1947
- L. hyalinus Coquillett, 1901
- L. lepidus Matile, 1997
- L. longipes Papp & Sevcik, 2011
- L. magnificus (Johannsen, 1910)
- L. matilei Papp & Sevcik, 2011
- L. medleri Matile, 1977
- L. nebulosus (Walker, 1848)
- L. papua Papp & Sevcik, 2011
- L. subcaeruleus (Coquillett, 1901)
- L. utarensis Papp & Sevcik, 2011
- L. walkeri Curtis, 1831
- L. ypsilon Johannsen, 1912
