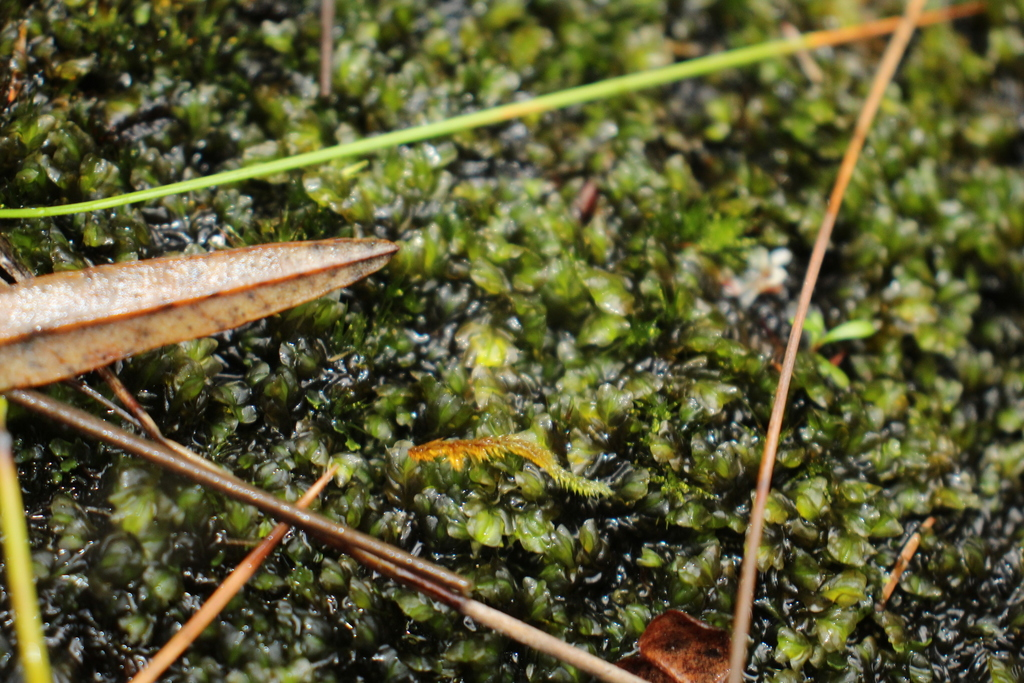

Scientific classification
- Kingdom: Plantae
- Division: Marchantiophyta
- Class: Jungermanniopsida
- Order: Jungermanniales
- Family: Jackiellaceae; R.M.Schust.
- Genus: Jackiella; Schiffn.

= Jackiella =

Genus of liverworts

Jackiella is a genus of liverworts in the order Jungermanniales. It is the only genus in the monotypic family Jackiellaceae.

The genus name of Jackiella is in honour of Joseph (Josef) Bernard Jack (1818-1901), who was a German apothecary and botanist (Cryptogam and Bryophytes).

The genus was circumscribed by Viktor Felix Schiffner in 1900. Species of the genus are mainly found in eastern Asia and Australia.

== Species ==
As accepted by GBIF;

- Jackiella angustifolia Herzog
- Jackiella brunnea (Horik.) S.Hatt.
- Jackiella ceylanica Schiffn. ex Steph.
- Jackiella curvata E.A.Hodgs. & Allison
- Jackiella javanica Schiffn.
- Jackiella renifolia Schiffn.
- Jackiella sinensis (W.E.Nicholson) Grolle
- Jackiella singapurensis Schiffn.
- Jackiella unica Steph.
