= Blepharidophyllaceae =

Scientific classification
- Kingdom: Plantae
- Division: Marchantiophyta
- Class: Jungermanniopsida
- Order: Jungermanniales
- Family: Blepharidophyllaceae; R.M.Schust. ex J.J.Engel

Family of liverworts

Blepharidophyllaceae is a family of liverworts belonging to the order Jungermanniales.

Genera:

- Blepharidophyllum Ångstr.
- Clandarium (Grolle) R.M.Schust.
