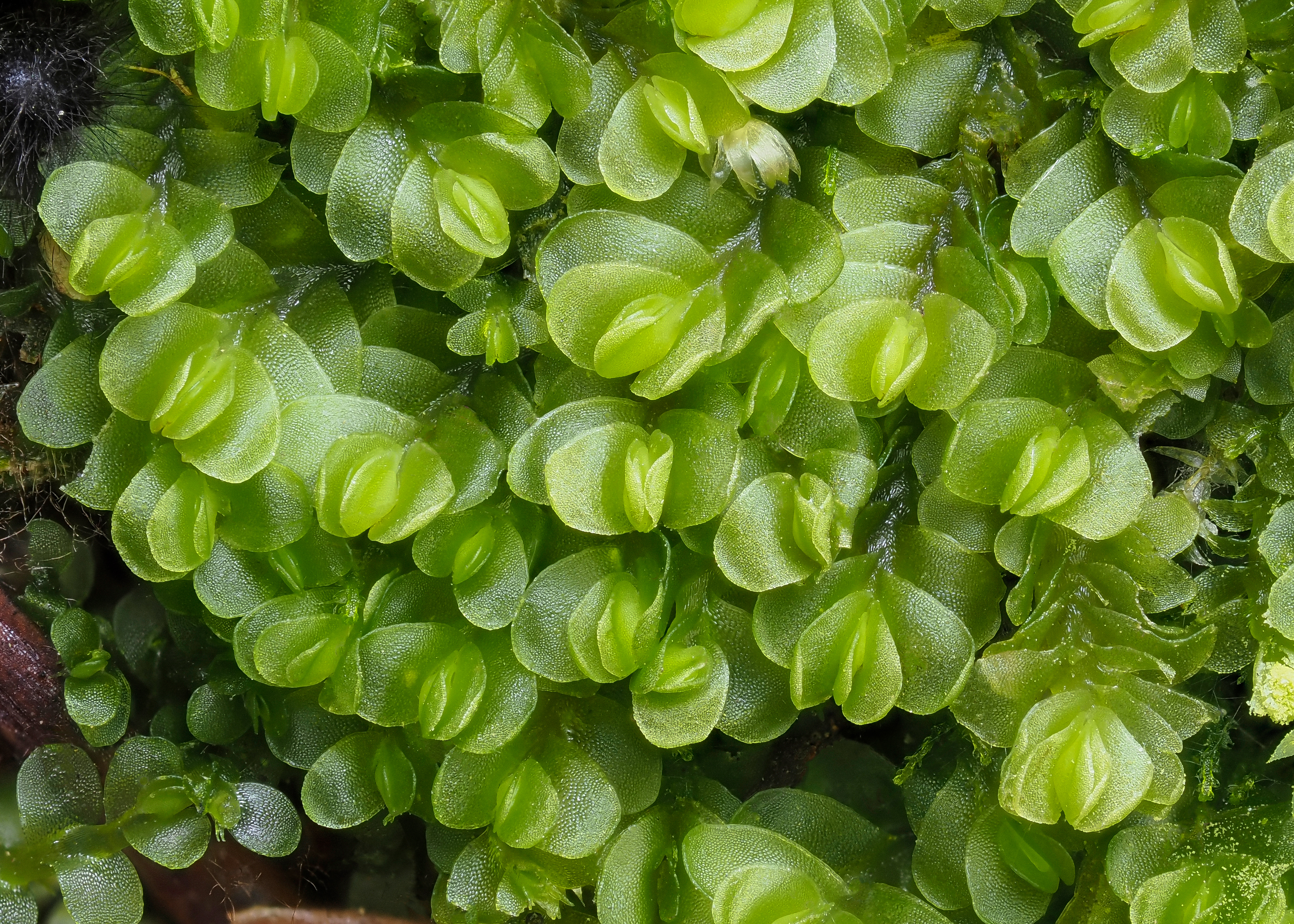
- Gyrothyra underwoodiana

Scientific classification
- Kingdom: Plantae
- Clade: Embryophytes
- Division: Marchantiophyta
- Class: Jungermanniopsida
- Order: Jungermanniales
- Family: Gyrothyraceae; R.M.Schust.
- Genus: Gyrothyra; M.Howe

= Gyrothyra =

Family of liverworts

Gyrothyraceae is a family of liverworts belonging to the order Jungermanniales. The family consists of only one genus: Gyrothyra.
