= Chonecolea =

Scientific classification
- Kingdom: Plantae
- Division: Marchantiophyta
- Class: Jungermanniopsida
- Order: Lophoziales
- Family: Cephaloziellaceae; R.M.Schust. ex Grolle, J. Bryol. 7(2): 206. 1972
- Genus: Chonecolea; Grolle

Family of liverworts

Chonecoleaceae is a monotypic family of liverworts in the order Jungermanniales. It only contains the one genus Chonecolea.

The genus is mainly found in Southern America and Florida.

== Species ==
As accepted by GBIF;

- Chonecolea acutiloba (Schiffn.) R.M.Schust.
- Chonecolea andina Grolle & Váňa
- Chonecolea doellingeri (Nees) Grolle
- Chonecolea ruwenzorensis E.W.Jones
- Chonecolea schusteri Udar & Ad.Kumar
- Chonecolea verae Potemkin
