= Grollea =

Scientific classification
- Kingdom: Plantae
- Division: Marchantiophyta
- Class: Jungermanniopsida
- Order: Jungermanniales
- Suborder: Lophocoleineae
- Family: Grolleaceae; Solari ex R.M.Schust.
- Genus: Grollea; R.M.Schust.

Genus of plants

Grolleaceae is a monotypic family of liverworts belonging to the order Jungermanniales. The family consists of only one genus, Grollea R.M.Schust.. It has only one known species Grollea antheliopsis R.M.Schust. from South America.

The genus name of Grollea is in honour of Riclef Grolle (Riclef Hans-Heinrich Grolle) (1934-2004), who was a German botanist (Bryology), plant researcher at the University of Jena.

The genus was circumscribed by Rudolf Mathias Schuster in Nova Hedwigia vol.8 on page 288 in 1964.
