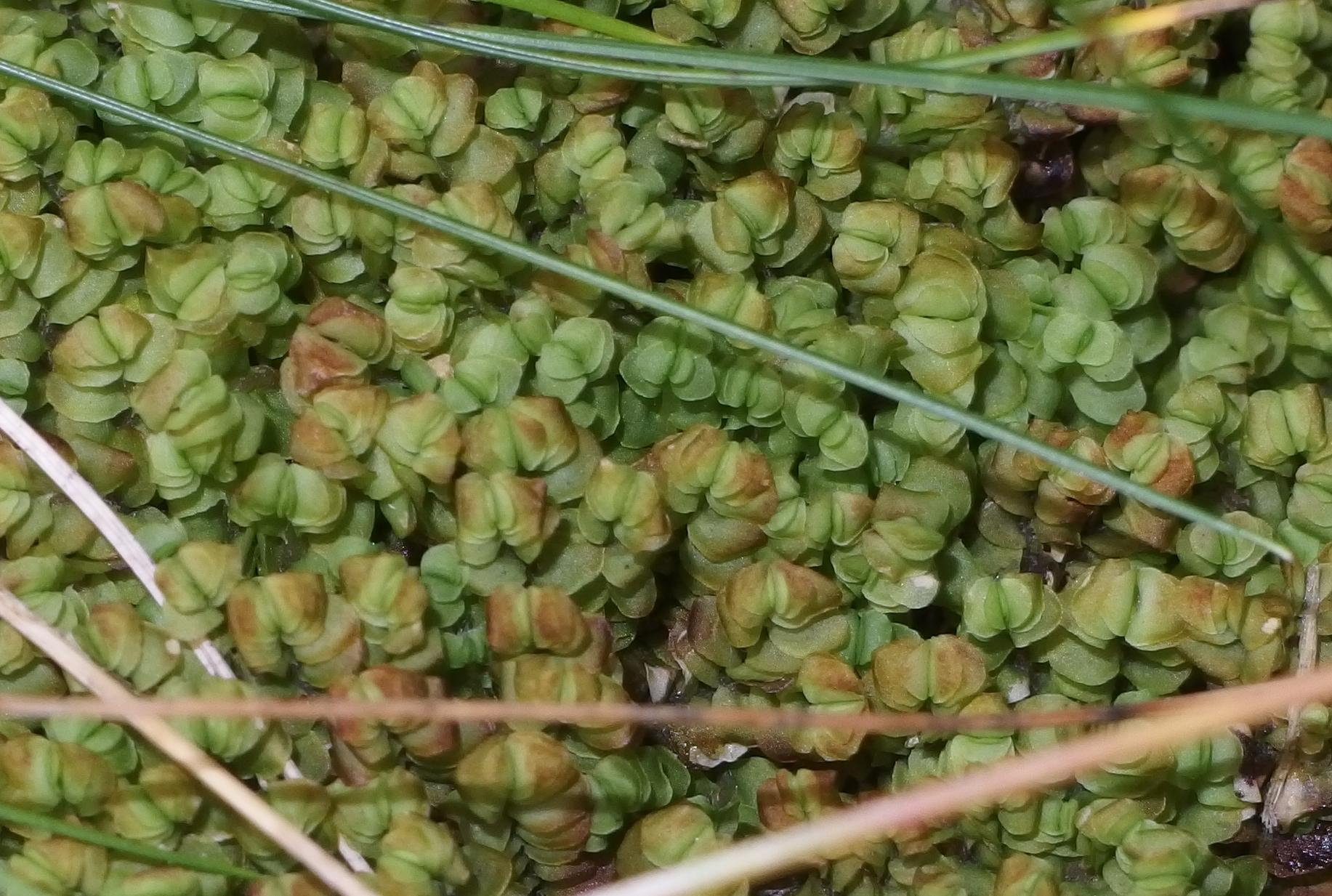

Scientific classification
- Kingdom: Plantae
- Division: Marchantiophyta
- Class: Jungermanniopsida
- Order: Myliales
- Family: Myliaceae
- Genus: Mylia
- Species: M. taylorii

Binomial name
- Mylia taylorii (Hook.) Gray

= Mylia taylorii =

Species of liverwort

Mylia taylorii, or Taylor's flapwort, is a species of leafy liverwort.

== Description ==
Mylia taylorii forms dense mats or hemispherical colonial growths of vertical shoots which have a swollen, slimy appearance when damp. The shoots are yellow-green tinged with brown or red, 3 – 8 cm tall. The leaves are up to 2.4 mm long and become close and overlapping towards the shoot tips. The rounded leaves have an entire margin, are attached to the stems obliquely and are succubous. Small narrow underleaves are present.

Asexual reproduction occurs by gemmae can be found on the margins of the upper leaves.

Mylia taylorii is dioecious but fertile plants are uncommon in Britain. The dark brown capsule is ovoid - globose.

== Distribution ==
Mylia taylorii is found in mountainous districts of northern Europe, the mountains of Continental Europe, Greenland and eastern North America from Newfoundland to Tennessee. There are scattered records for western North America and eastern Asia. Mylia taylorii is probably most common in Great Britain and Scandinavia.

== Ecology and conservation ==
Typically grows on peaty banks, bases of trees, rock faces, screes and open woodland in high rainfall climates.

According to Ratcliffe's account of oceanic bryophytes bordering the Atlantic, M. taylorii is classified as a Western British species.

The distribution of M. taylorii is limited by a requirement for at least 120-140 wet days per year. In Britain it is often found in the widespread derelict forests of sessile oak (Quercus petraea) and downy birch (Betula pubescens), managed as poor sheep pasture with scattered trees, in the uplands of Western Britain.

Mylia taylorii is consistently calcifugous in its choice of substrate.

== Gallery ==
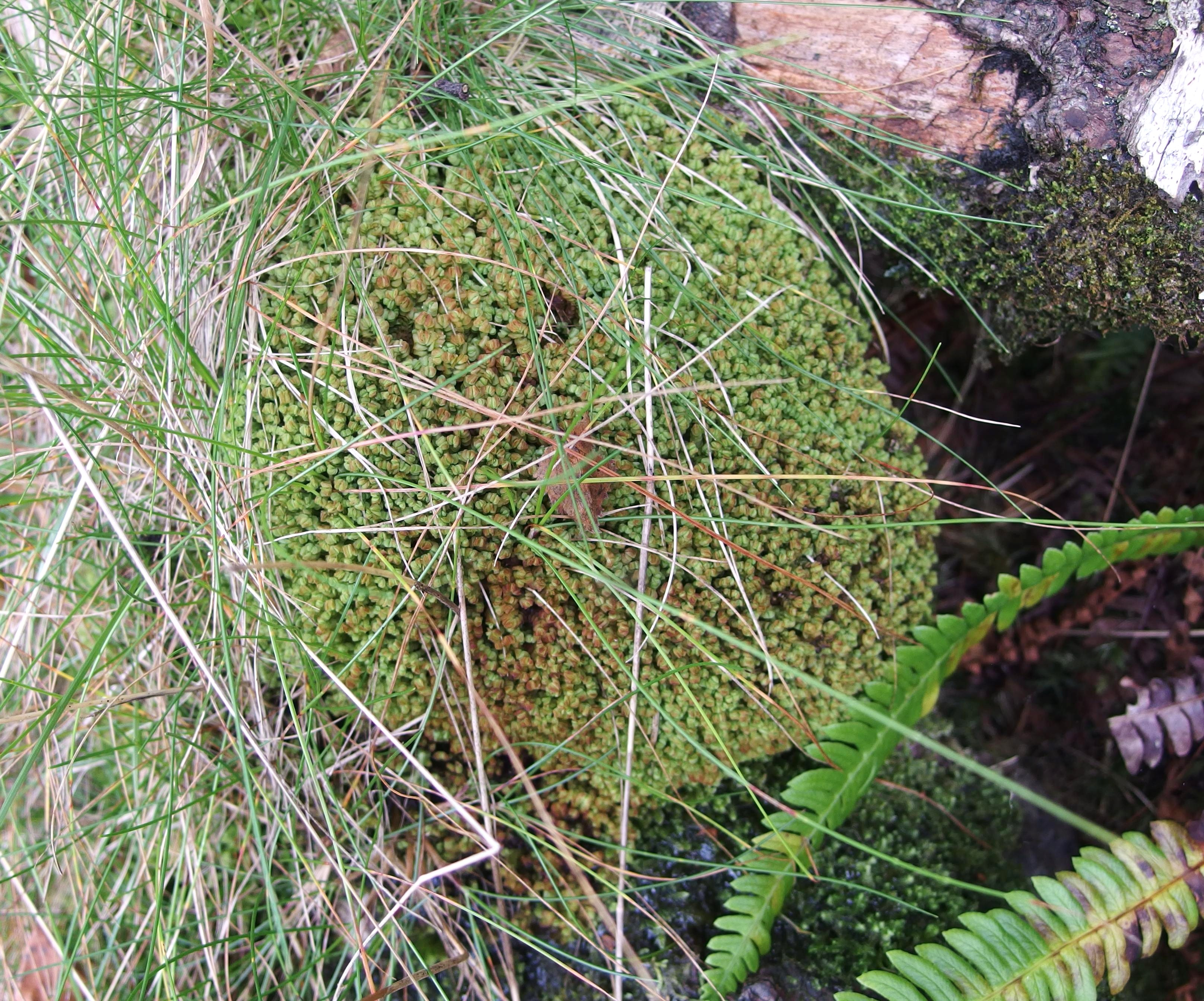
Mylia taylori colony.

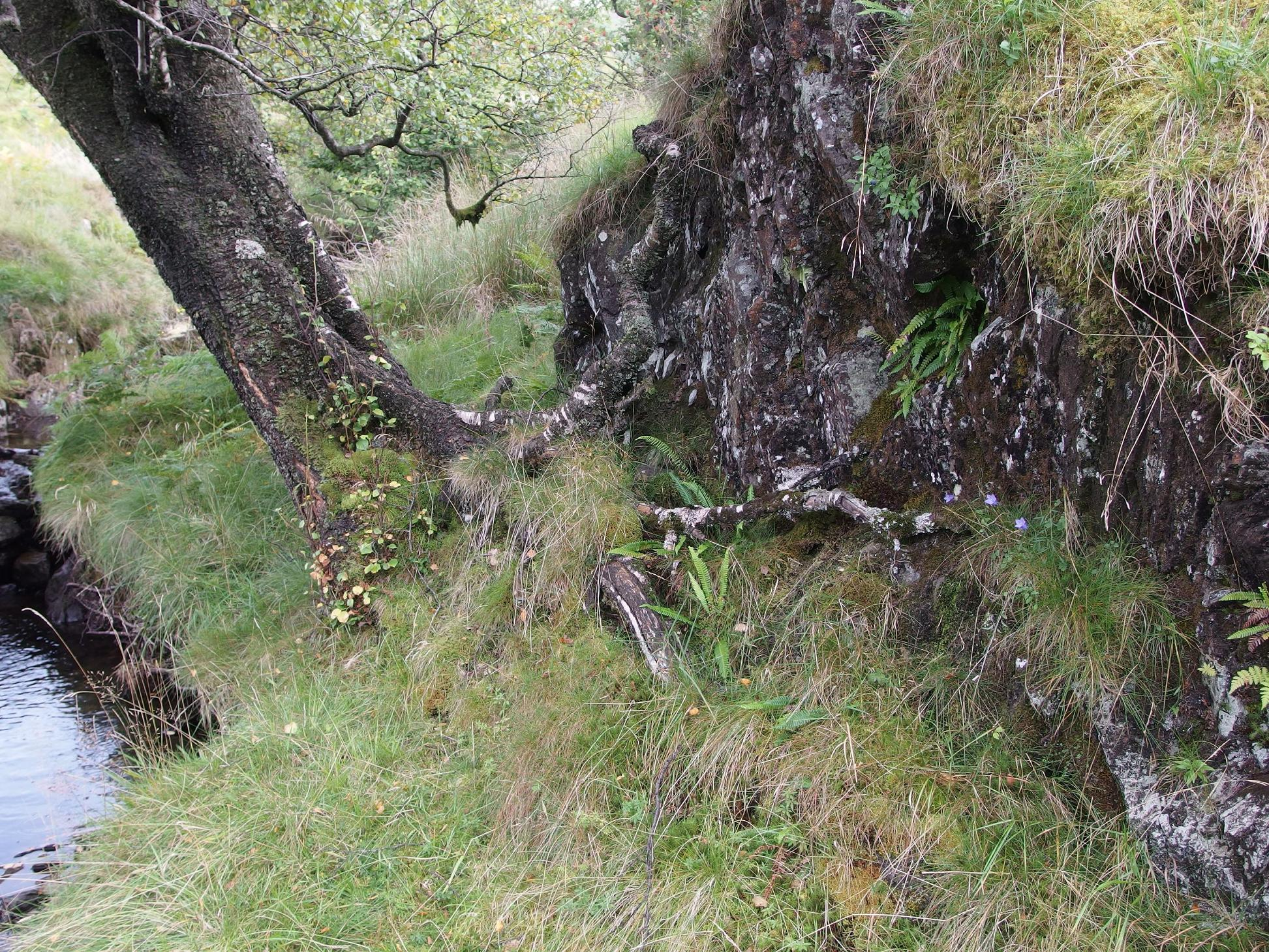
Habitat of Mylia taylori. Near Kendal, Cumbria, England.
