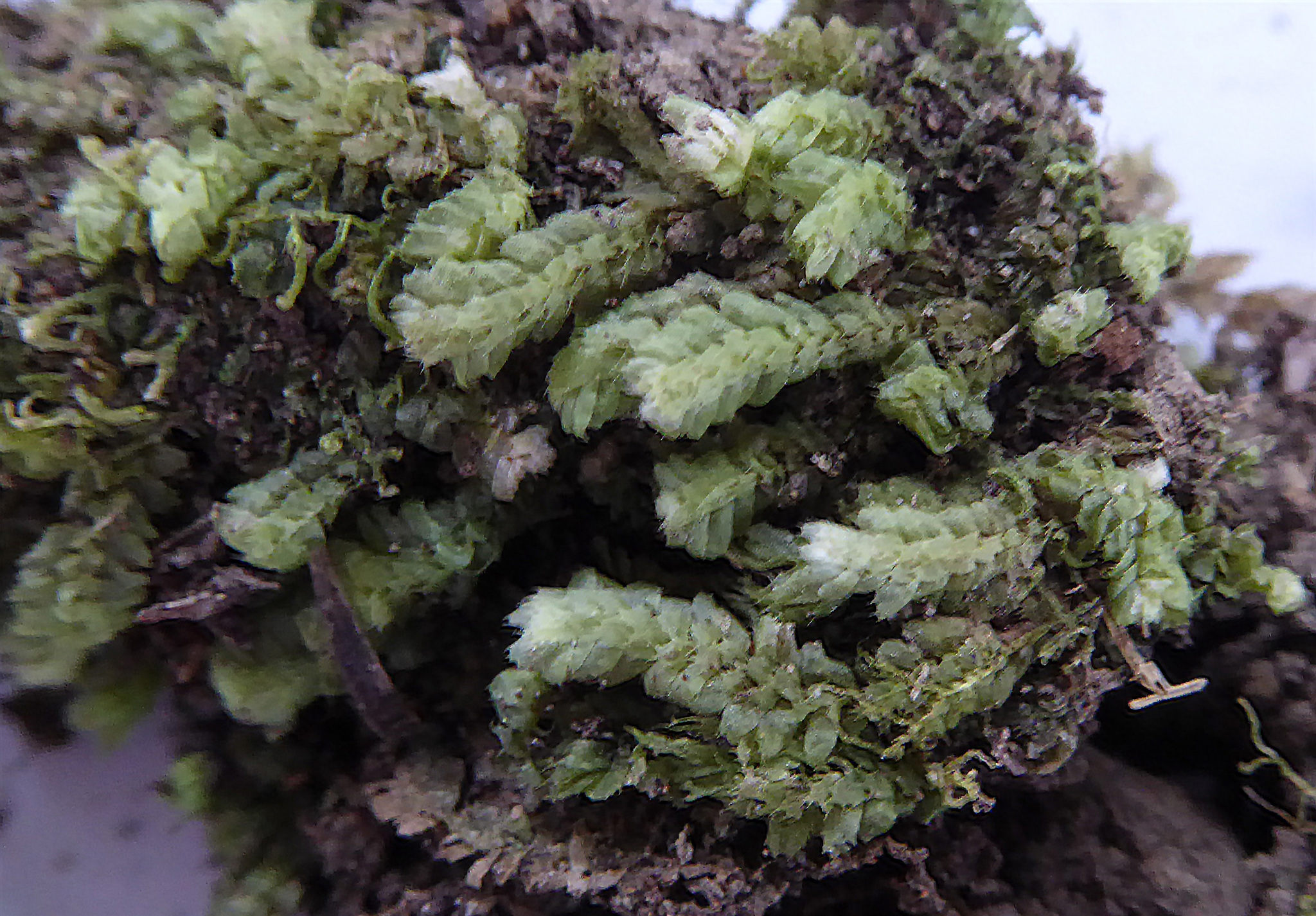
- Balantiopsis diplophylla

Scientific classification
- Kingdom: Plantae
- Division: Marchantiophyta
- Class: Jungermanniopsida
- Order: Jungermanniales
- Family: Balantiopsidaceae; H.Buch.

= Balantiopsidaceae =

Family of liverworts

Balantiopsidaceae is a family of liverworts belonging to the order Jungermanniales.

Subfamilies and genera:

  - Acroscyphella N.Kitag. & Grolle (not assigned to a subfamily)
  - Pseudoisotachis Vána (not assigned to a subfamily)
- Balantiopsidoideae J.J.Engel & Vána
  - Balantiopsis Mitt.
- Isotachidoideae Grolle
  - Isotachis Mitt.
  - Neesioscyphus Grolle
- Ruizanthoideae R.M.Schust. ex J.J.Engel & G.L.Merr.
  - Ruizanthus R.M.Schust.
