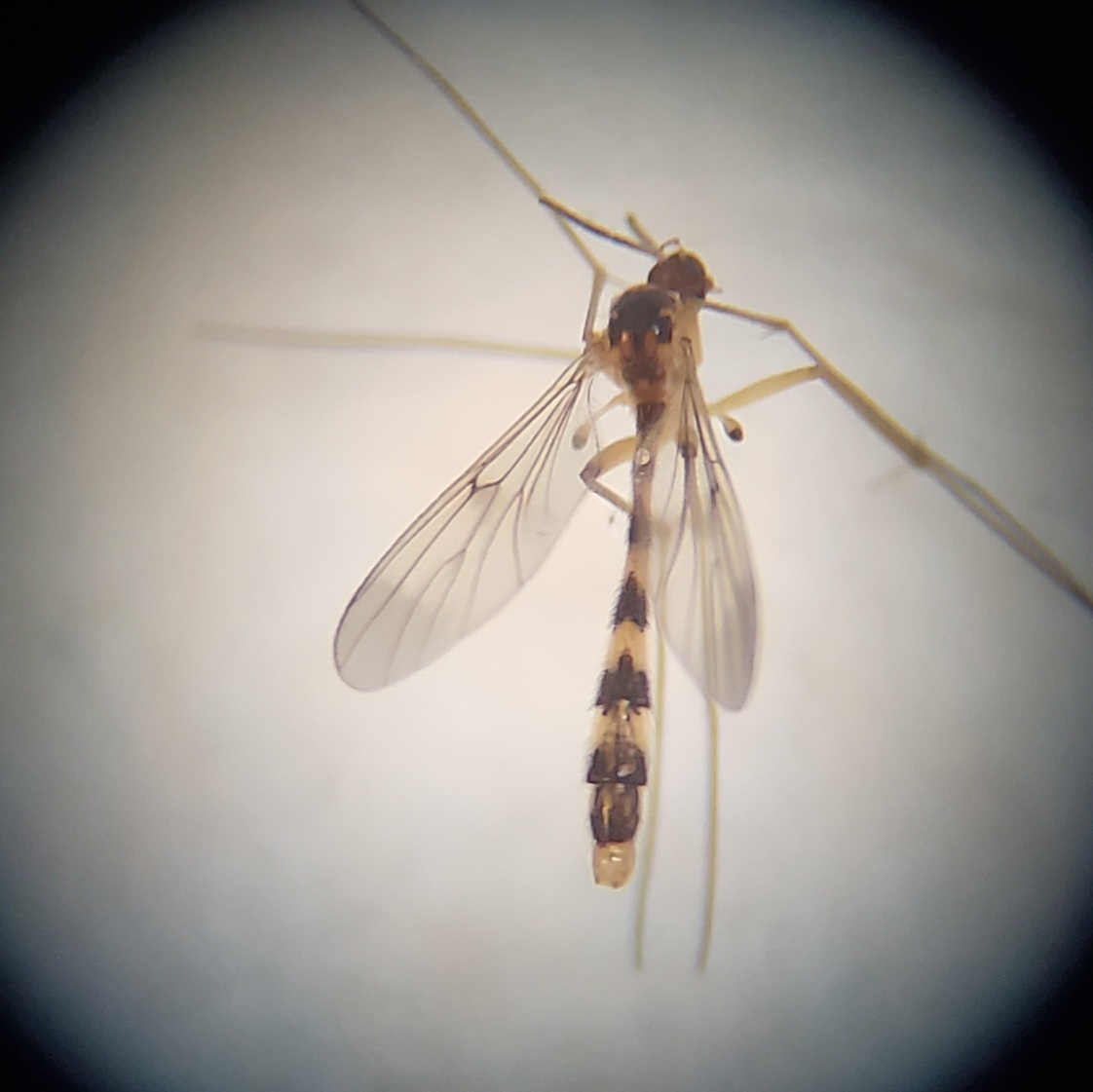

Scientific classification
- Domain: Eukaryota
- Kingdom: Animalia
- Phylum: Arthropoda
- Class: Insecta
- Order: Diptera
- Family: Mycetophilidae
- Genus: Leptomorphus
- Species: L. hyalinus

Binomial name
- Leptomorphus hyalinus Coquillett, 1901

= Leptomorphus hyalinus =

Species of fly

Leptomorphus hyalinus is a species of fungus gnats in the family Mycetophilidae.
