= Trichotemnoma =

Scientific classification
- Kingdom: Plantae
- Division: Marchantiophyta
- Class: Jungermanniopsida
- Order: Jungermanniales
- Family: Trichotemnomataceae; R.M. Schust.
- Genus: Trichotemnoma; R.M. Schust.
- Species: T. corrugatum

Binomial name
- Trichotemnoma corrugatum (Steph.) R.M. Schust.

Synonyms
- Blepharostoma corrugatum Steph. Temnoma corrugatum (Steph.) Schust.

Genus of liverworts

Trichotemnoma is a genus of liverworts restricted to New Zealand and Tasmania, and contains a single species Trichotemnoma corrugatum. It is classified in the order Jungermanniales and is the only member of the family Trichotemnomataceae within that order. The generic name Trichotemnona was originally published in 1964, but that publication was invalid under the ICBN.
