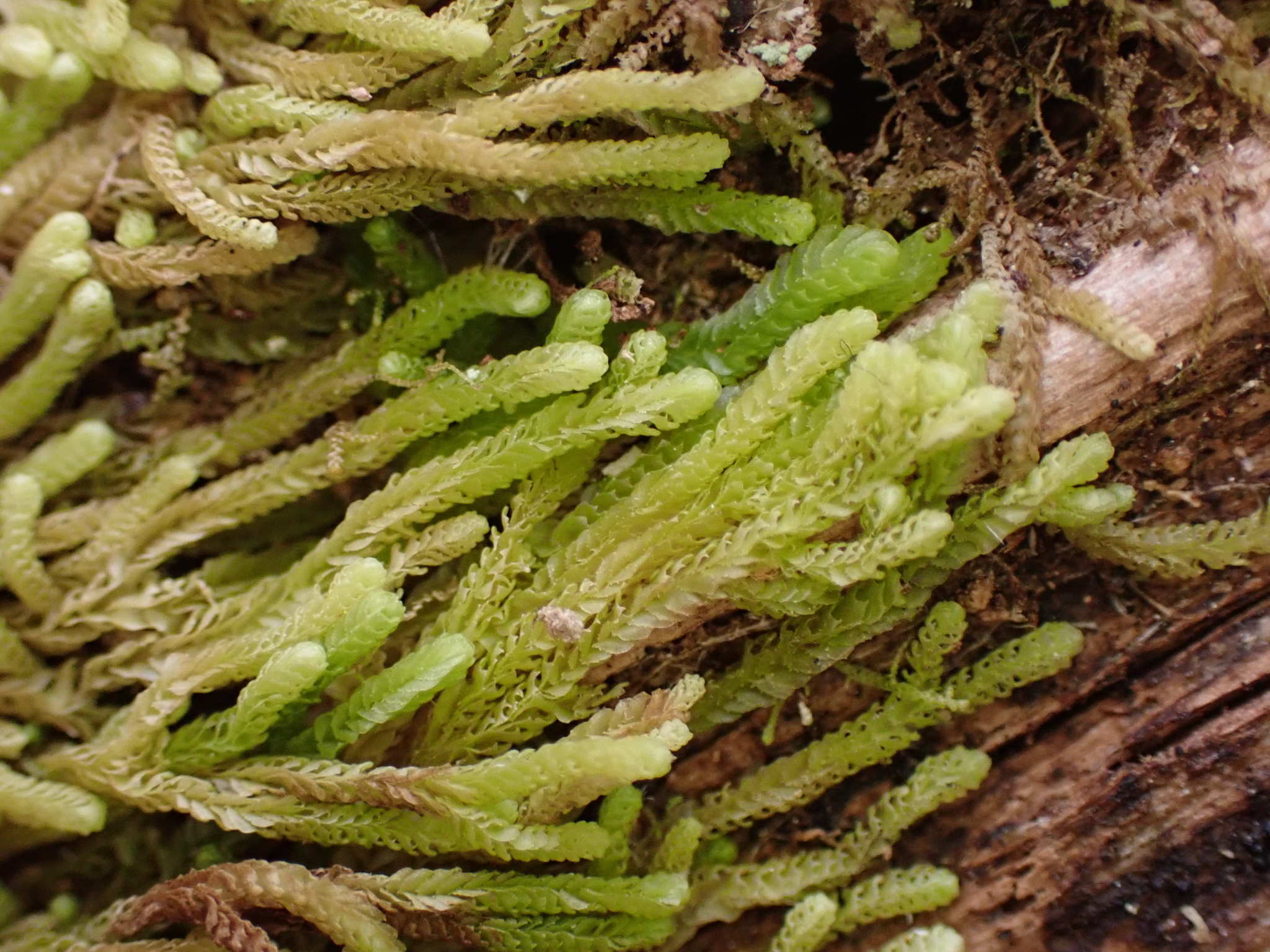
- Tetracymbaliella sp.

Scientific classification
- Kingdom: Plantae
- Division: Marchantiophyta
- Class: Jungermanniopsida
- Order: Lepidoziales
- Family: Brevianthaceae; J.J.Engel & R.M.Schust.

= Brevianthaceae =

Family of liverworts

Brevianthaceae is a family of liverworts belonging to the order Jungermanniales.

Genera:

- Brevianthus J.J.Engel & R.M.Schust.
- Tetracymbaliella Grolle
