= Blepharostoma =

Scientific classification
- Kingdom: Plantae
- Division: Marchantiophyta
- Class: Jungermanniopsida
- Order: Lepidoziales
- Family: Blepharostomataceae
- Genus: Blepharostoma (Dumort. emend. Lindb.) Dumort.

Genus of liverworts

Blepharostoma is a genus of liverworts belonging to the family Blepharostomataceae.

The genus was first described by Barthélemy Charles Joseph Dumortier.

The genus has cosmopolitan distribution.

Species:

- Blepharostoma trichophyllum (L.) Dumort.
