= Leptomorphus bifasciatus =

Scientific classification
- Kingdom: Animalia
- Phylum: Arthropoda
- Class: Insecta
- Order: Diptera
- Family: Mycetophilidae
- Genus: Leptomorphus
- Species: L. bifasciatus

Binomial name
- Leptomorphus bifasciatus (Say, 1824)

Synonyms
- Sciophila bifasciatus Say, 1824

Species of fly

Leptomorphus bifasciatus is a species of fungus gnats, insects in the family Mycetophilidae. It is known from the northeastern United States.
