= Leptomorphus nebulosus =

Scientific classification
- Kingdom: Animalia
- Phylum: Arthropoda
- Class: Insecta
- Order: Diptera
- Family: Mycetophilidae
- Genus: Leptomorphus
- Species: L. nebulosus

Binomial name
- Leptomorphus nebulosus (Walker, 1848)

Synonyms
- Diomonus nebulosus Walker, 1848

Species of fly

Leptomorphus nebulosus is a species of fungus gnats in the family Mycetophilidae. It occurs in North America in both Canada and the United States.
