= Arnellia =

Scientific classification
- Kingdom: Plantae
- Division: Marchantiophyta
- Class: Jungermanniopsida
- Order: Jungermanniales
- Family: Arnelliaceae; Nakai
- Genus: Arnellia; Lindb.
- Species: A. fennica

Binomial name
- Arnellia fennica (Gottsche) Lindb.

Synonyms
- Jungermannia fennica Gottsche

Genus of plants

Arnelliaceae is a monotypic family of liverworts belonging to the order Jungermanniales. The family only contains a single genus, Arnellia, which has only one known species, Arnellia fennica (Gottsche) Lindb.. which is known as the tundra liverwort.

It is only found in the northern hemisphere of the world.

The genus name of Arnellia is in honour of Hampus Wilhelm Arnell (2 August 1848 in Härnösand – 1932 in Uppsala), a Swedish bryologist.
