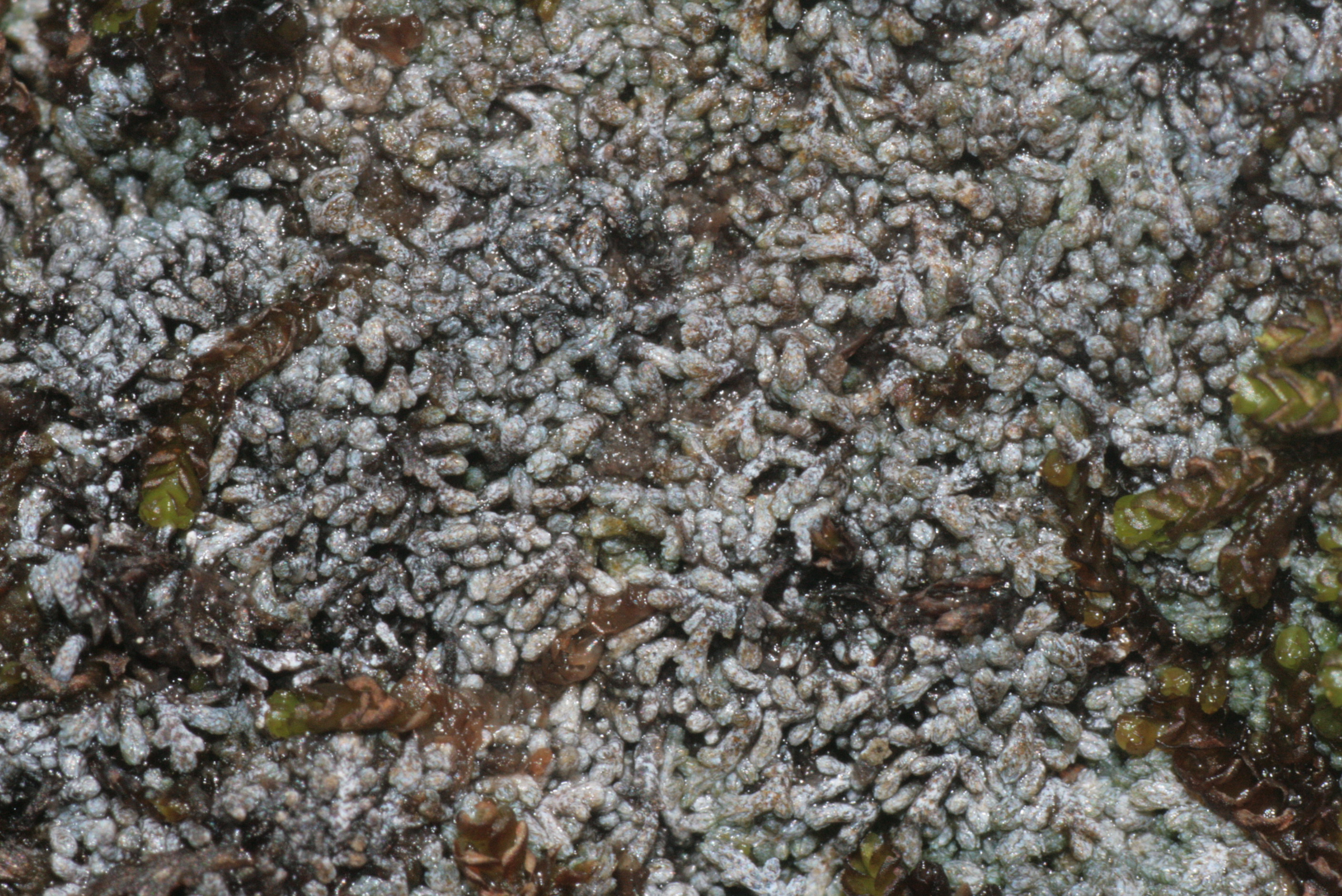

Scientific classification
- Kingdom: Plantae
- Division: Marchantiophyta
- Class: Jungermanniopsida
- Order: Jungermanniales
- Family: Antheliaceae; R.M.Schust.
- Genus: Anthelia (Dumort.) Dumort.

= Anthelia (plant) =

Family of liverworts

Antheliaceae is a monotypic liverwort family in the order Jungermanniales. It contains a single genus, Anthelia.

Most species are found in the Northern hemisphere, with only a few species found in the southern hemisphere.

== Species ==
According to GBIF:

- Anthelia africana Stephani
- Anthelia andina Herzog
- Anthelia asperifolia (Taylor) Spruce
- Anthelia julacea (L.) Dumort.
- Anthelia juratzkana (Limpr.) Trevis.
- Anthelia subaequifolia (Nees & Mont.) Trevis.
- Anthelia viridissima (Nees) Dumort.
