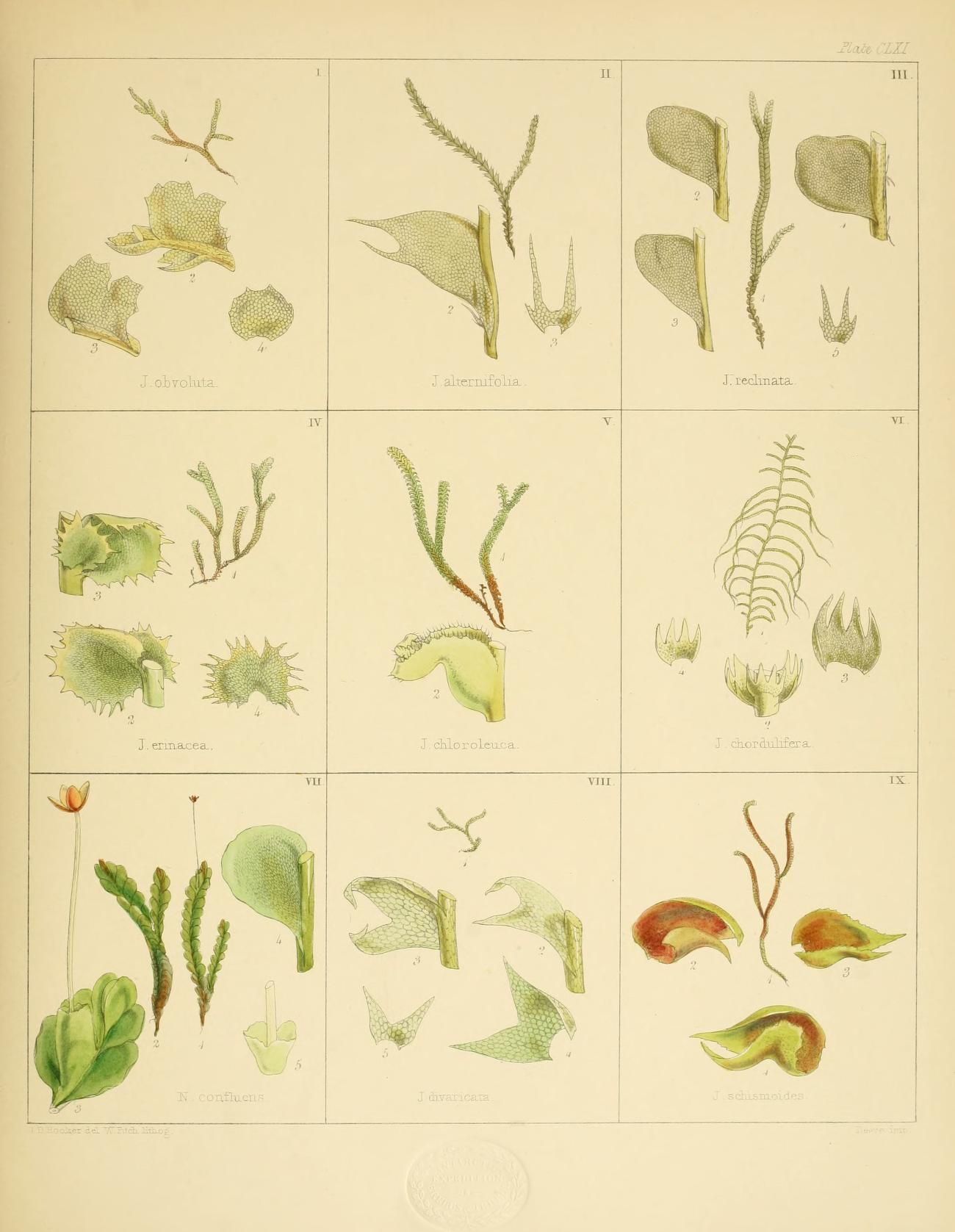
- Illustration of Hooker's Flora Antarctica from 1844, of nine small images of various species Jungermannia

Scientific classification
- Kingdom: Plantae
- Division: Marchantiophyta
- Class: Jungermanniopsida
- Order: Jungermanniales
- Family: Jungermanniaceae
- Genus: Jungermannia; L.

Synonyms
- Aplozia (Dumort.) Dumort.; Conianthos P.Beauv.; Lichenastrum Dill.

= Jungermannia =

Genus of liverworts

Jungermannia is a genus of leafy liverworts belonging to the family Jungermanniaceae. They have a worldwide distribution.

== Species ==
As accepted by World Flora Online;

- Jungermannia achroa Spruce
- Jungermannia acris Wibel
- Jungermannia aculeata Hook.f. & Taylor
- Jungermannia adscendens Hook. & Wilson ex Stephani
- Jungermannia aequiloba Schwägr.
- Jungermannia affinis Reinw., Blume & Nees
- Jungermannia albicans L.
- Jungermannia algeriensis Gottsche & Rabenh.
- Jungermannia alicularia De Not.
- Jungermannia allenii L.Clark
- Jungermannia alternifolia Hook.f. & Taylor
- Jungermannia amakawana Ajit P. Singh & V. Nath
- Jungermannia amentacea Bertol.
- Jungermannia amoena Lindenb. & Gottsche
- Jungermannia amplexicaulis Dumort.
- Jungermannia amplexifolia (Hampe ex Lehm.) Grolle
- Jungermannia anisodonta Hook.f. & Taylor
- Jungermannia antarctica Ångström
- Jungermannia appressifolia Mitt.
- Jungermannia aquatica Vill.
- Jungermannia arenaria Nees
- Jungermannia ariadne Taylor ex Lehm.
- Jungermannia ascendens Wilson & Hook.
- Jungermannia asplenioides L.
- Jungermannia atro-olivacea Amak.
- Jungermannia atrobrunnea Amak.
- Jungermannia atrofusca (Herzog) S.Hatt.
- Jungermannia atrovirens Dumort.
- Jungermannia aubertii Schwägr.
- Jungermannia austroafricana S.W.Arnell
- Jungermannia balfourii Váňa
- Jungermannia bantamensis Reinw., Blume & Nees
- Jungermannia bartlingii Hampe ex Nees
- Jungermannia bastovii Carrington & Pearson
- Jungermannia baueri Mart.
- Jungermannia baueriana (Schiffner) Arnell
- Jungermannia bengalensis Amak.
- Jungermannia bergiana Lehm. & Lindenb.
- Jungermannia bicuspidata L.
- Jungermannia bidentata L.
- Jungermannia biformis Austin
- Jungermannia birostrata Schleich. ex Lam. & DC.
- Jungermannia borealis Damsh. & Váňa
- Jungermannia borgenii Gottsche
- Jungermannia brasiliensis Raddi
- Jungermannia brevicaulis Raddi
- Jungermannia breviperianthia C.Gao
- Jungermannia brunnea Spreng.
- Jungermannia byssacea Roth
- Jungermannia caelestis Inoue & Váňa
- Jungermannia caespiticia Lindenb.
- Jungermannia calcarata Reinw., Blume & Nees
- Jungermannia calcarea (Lib.) Wallr.
- Jungermannia callithrix Lindenb. & Gottsche
- Jungermannia calocysta Spruce
- Jungermannia caoii C.Gao & X.L.Bai
- Jungermannia capilligera Schwägr.
- Jungermannia caucasica Váňa
- Jungermannia cephalozioides Amak.
- Jungermannia ceylanica Stephani
- Jungermannia cheniana C.Gao, Y.H.Wu & Grolle
- Jungermannia chiloscyphoides (Horik.) S.Hatt.
- Jungermannia chinensis Osbeck
- Jungermannia ciliaris L.
- Jungermannia circinalis Lehm.
- Jungermannia clavellata (Mitt. ex Stephani) Amak.
- Jungermannia claviflora Nees ex Mart.
- Jungermannia clavigera Hook.
- Jungermannia cognata Nees
- Jungermannia colpodes Taylor
- Jungermannia comata Nees
- Jungermannia commutata Huebener
- Jungermannia complanata L.
- Jungermannia comptonii (Pearson) H.A.Mill.
- Jungermannia conchifolia Hook. & Arn.
- Jungermannia conferta C.F.W.Meissn. ex Spreng.
- Jungermannia confertissima Nees
- Jungermannia conjugata Hook.
- Jungermannia conradii Corda
- Jungermannia convexa Scop.
- Jungermannia cordifolia Brot.
- Jungermannia crassa Schwägr.
- Jungermannia crenulata Schmidel
- Jungermannia crenuliformis Austin
- Jungermannia crispa Spreng. ex Gottsche, Lindenb. & Nees
- Jungermannia crispata Hook.
- Jungermannia cyclops S.Hatt.
- Jungermannia cylindracea Dumort.
- Jungermannia cylindrica Wallr.
- Jungermannia cymbifolia Hook. ex Lehm. & Lindenb.
- Jungermannia cyparioides Schwägr.
- Jungermannia decolor V.F.Schiffner
- Jungermannia decolyana Schiffner ex Stephani
- Jungermannia decurrens Desv.
- Jungermannia densifolia Hook.
- Jungermannia diademata Hook.f. & Taylor
- Jungermannia dicksonii Hook.
- Jungermannia dilitata L.
- Jungermannia discoidea Lehm. & Lindenb.
- Jungermannia distinctifolia (Lindenb.) Hook.f. & Taylor
- Jungermannia divaricata Sm.
- Jungermannia diversiclavellata Amak. & Grolle
- Jungermannia doelaviensis Spreng.
- Jungermannia dubia F.Weber
- Jungermannia dubioides H.A.Mill.
- Jungermannia ecklonii Spreng.
- Jungermannia elongata Lehm.
- Jungermannia epiphlaea Schrank
- Jungermannia epiphylla L.
- Jungermannia erecta (Amak.) Amak.
- Jungermannia erectifolia Stephani
- Jungermannia erectii Ajit P.Singh & V.Nath
- Jungermannia ericetorum (Raddi) Bertol.
- Jungermannia eriocaula Hook.
- Jungermannia eucordifolia Schljakov
- Jungermannia evansii Váňa
- Jungermannia exsertifolia Stephani
- Jungermannia extensa Taylor
- Jungermannia falcata Hook.
- Jungermannia fauriana Beauverd
- Jungermannia flaccidula Amak.
- Jungermannia flagellalioides (C.Gao) Piippo
- Jungermannia flagellaris Amak.
- Jungermannia flagellata (S.Hatt.) Amak.
- Jungermannia flagellifera Hook.
- Jungermannia formosa C.F.W.Meissn. ex Spreng.
- Jungermannia fossombronioides Austin
- Jungermannia frullanioides Colenso
- Jungermannia furcata L.
- Jungermannia fusiformis (Stephani) Stephani
- Jungermannia glaucum (Amak.) Váňa & D.G.Long
- Jungermannia gongshanensis C.Gao & J.Sun
- Jungermannia gracillima Sm.
- Jungermannia granulata (Stephani) Amak.
- Jungermannia grollei Amak.
- Jungermannia haliotiphylla De Not.
- Jungermannia handelii (Schiffner) Amak.
- Jungermannia hasskarliana (Nees) Mitt.
- Jungermannia hattoriana (Amak.) Amak.
- Jungermannia hattorii Amak.
- Jungermannia hawaiica (H.A.Mill.) Váňa
- Jungermannia heteracria Spruce
- Jungermannia heterodonta Hook.f. & Taylor
- Jungermannia heterolimbata Amak.
- Jungermannia hexagona Schwägr.
- Jungermannia hiugaensis (Amak.) Amak.
- Jungermannia hokkaidensis Váňa
- Jungermannia holorhiza Reinw., Nees & Blume
- Jungermannia hookeri Sm.
- Jungermannia horizontalis Hook.
- Jungermannia hyalina Lyell
- Jungermannia hymenophyllum Hook.
- Jungermannia immersa Ångström ex C.Hartm.
- Jungermannia incerta Gottsche
- Jungermannia incurvicolla Hook.f. & Taylor
- Jungermannia indica Nees
- Jungermannia indrodayana S.K.Singh & D.K.Singh
- Jungermannia infusca (Mitt.) Stephani
- Jungermannia inouensis Beauverd
- Jungermannia jamesonii Mont.
- Jungermannia japonica Amak.
- Jungermannia javanica Sw.
- Jungermannia jenseniana Grolle
- Jungermannia julacea L.
- Jungermannia junghuhniana Nees
- Jungermannia juratzkana Limpr.
- Jungermannia karl-muelleri Grolle
- Jungermannia kashyapii S.C.Srivast., S.Srivastava & D.Sharma
- Jungermannia kinabalensis Amak.
- Jungermannia konstantinovae Bakalin & Vilnet
- Jungermannia koreana (Stephani) Amak.
- Jungermannia kuwaharae Amak.
- Jungermannia kyushuensis Amak.
- Jungermannia lamellata Hook.
- Jungermannia lanata Hook.
- Jungermannia lanceolata L.
- Jungermannia lanigera Mitt.
- Jungermannia laxiphylla C.Gao & X.L.Bai
- Jungermannia leiantha Grolle
- Jungermannia lignicola (Schiffner) Grolle
- Jungermannia limbata Hook.f. & Taylor
- Jungermannia linguifolia Gottsche
- Jungermannia lixingjiangiae C.Gao & X.L.Bai
- Jungermannia lobulata Hook.
- Jungermannia longifolia (Schiffner) Stephani
- Jungermannia louae C.Gao & X.L.Bai
- Jungermannia lycopodioides Wallr.
- Jungermannia lyonii Taylor
- Jungermannia mackaii Hook.
- Jungermannia macrocarpa Stephani
- Jungermannia macrorhiza Dicks.
- Jungermannia magna (Amak.) Amak.
- Jungermannia mairangii Ajit P.Singh & V.Nath
- Jungermannia mamatkulovii Váňa & Zerov
- Jungermannia marsilea Weber
- Jungermannia martiana Nees
- Jungermannia mauii Austin
- Jungermannia menzelii Corda
- Jungermannia menziesii Hook.
- Jungermannia michelii Mérat
- Jungermannia microphylla Hook.
- Jungermannia microrevoluta C.Gao & X.L.Bai
- Jungermannia miehena Stephani
- Jungermannia mildeana Gottsche
- Jungermannia minutissima Sm.
- Jungermannia minutiverrucosa Amak.
- Jungermannia mizutanii Amak.
- Jungermannia mollissima Hook.f. & Taylor
- Jungermannia mollusca De Not.
- Jungermannia monticola S.Hatt.
- Jungermannia multicarpa C.Gao & J.Sun
- Jungermannia multifida L.
- Jungermannia murmanica (Kaal.) Arnell
- Jungermannia musae Spreng.
- Jungermannia myosota Hook.f. & Taylor
- Jungermannia nana Nees ex Flot.
- Jungermannia nigrescens Mitt.
- Jungermannia nigricaulis Reinw., Blume & Nees
- Jungermannia nilgiriensis A.Alam, Ad.Kumar & S.C.Srivast.
- Jungermannia nimbosa Taylor
- Jungermannia nipponica (Sakurai & G.Takah.) S.Hatt.
- Jungermannia nivalis Sw. ex Wahlenb.
- Jungermannia nobilis Hook.
- Jungermannia obcordata Lehm. & Lindenb.
- Jungermannia obliquata Nees
- Jungermannia oblonga Schwein.
- Jungermannia oblongifolia Hook.f. & Taylor
- Jungermannia obovata Nees
- Jungermannia obtusiflora Stephani
- Jungermannia ochroleuca L.f. ex Spreng.
- Jungermannia odorata With.
- Jungermannia ohbae Amak.
- Jungermannia onraedtii Váňa
- Jungermannia opacula Spruce
- Jungermannia orizabensis Gottsche
- Jungermannia otiana (S.Hatt.) Amak.
- Jungermannia ovato-trigona (Steph.) Grolle
- Jungermannia pachyrhiza Nees
- Jungermannia paroica (Schiffner) Grolle
- Jungermannia parviperiantha C.Gao & X.L.Bai
- Jungermannia parvitexta Amak.
- Jungermannia parvula Wilson
- Jungermannia paucifolia Colenso
- Jungermannia paupercula Taylor
- Jungermannia pellucida C.F.W.Meissn. ex Spreng.
- Jungermannia pendulina Hook.f.
- Jungermannia perloi (Gola) Váňa
- Jungermannia pinguis L.
- Jungermannia pinnatifolia Hook.
- Jungermannia placophylla Taylor
- Jungermannia plagiochilacea Grolle
- Jungermannia plagiochiloides (Spruce) Mitt.
- Jungermannia planifolia Hook.
- Jungermannia platyphylla L.
- Jungermannia plicata Hartm.
- Jungermannia plicatiscypha Taylor
- Jungermannia plicatula Stephani
- Jungermannia pluridentata Mitt.
- Jungermannia pocsii Váňa
- Jungermannia polaris Lindb.
- Jungermannia polyanthos L.
- Jungermannia polyclada Hook.f. & Lév.
- Jungermannia polymorpha (L.) Hook.f. & Taylor
- Jungermannia polyphylla Sw.
- Jungermannia polyrhiza Hook. ex Lehm. & Lindenb.
- Jungermannia porella Dicks.
- Jungermannia portoricensis Spreng.
- Jungermannia potamophila Moug., Nestl. & Schimp.
- Jungermannia preissiana Lehm.
- Jungermannia primordialis Hook.f. & Taylor
- Jungermannia procumbens Hook.f. & Taylor
- Jungermannia pseudocyclops Inoue
- Jungermannia pseudodecolyana Amak.
- Jungermannia ptychantha (Mont.) Hook.f. & Taylor
- Jungermannia pulchella Hook.
- Jungermannia pulvinata Raddi
- Jungermannia pumila With.
- Jungermannia pungens Wilson
- Jungermannia purpurata Mitt.
- Jungermannia purpurea Scop.
- Jungermannia pusilla L.
- Jungermannia pycnantha Hook.f. & Taylor
- Jungermannia pygmaea Wulfen
- Jungermannia pyriflora Stephani
- Jungermannia quadridens Nees
- Jungermannia quadridentata Wulfen
- Jungermannia quadridigitata Griff.
- Jungermannia quadrifida Mitt.
- Jungermannia quadripartita Hook.
- Jungermannia raddiana C.Massal.
- Jungermannia radiata Nees
- Jungermannia radicans Hoffm.
- Jungermannia radicellosa (Mitt.) Stephani
- Jungermannia ramosissima Hook.
- Jungermannia rauana Stephani
- Jungermannia raujeana Grolle
- Jungermannia reclinans Hook.f. & Taylor
- Jungermannia recondita Lehm. & Lindenb.
- Jungermannia renauldii Stephani
- Jungermannia reniformia (Horik.) S.Hatt.
- Jungermannia repanda Schwägr.
- Jungermannia repens D.Dietr.
- Jungermannia repleta Hook.f. & Taylor
- Jungermannia reptans L.
- Jungermannia resupinata L.
- Jungermannia retrospectans Nees ex Spreng.
- Jungermannia retusata Hook.f. & Taylor
- Jungermannia revolvens Hook.f. & Taylor
- Jungermannia rhizophora Reinw., Blume & Nees
- Jungermannia riparia (Amak.) Amak.
- Jungermannia rishiriensis (Amak.) Amak.
- Jungermannia rivalis Hook.f. & Taylor
- Jungermannia rivularis F.Weber & D.Mohr
- Jungermannia rosacea Corda
- Jungermannia rostellata Huebener
- Jungermannia rosulans (Stephani) Stephani
- Jungermannia rotaeana (De Not.) Bertol.
- Jungermannia rothii Schwägr.
- Jungermannia rotundata (Amak.) Amak.
- Jungermannia rotundifolia (Horik.) S.Hatt.
- Jungermannia rubiginosa Neck.
- Jungermannia rubra Gottsche ex Underw.
- Jungermannia rubripunctata (S.Hatt.) Amak.
- Jungermannia rupicola Amak.
- Jungermannia rupincola Schleich.
- Jungermannia saccata Hook.
- Jungermannia saccaticoncava Amak.
- Jungermannia saccatula Lindb.
- Jungermannia sanguinolenta Griff.
- Jungermannia sarmentosa Lehm.
- Jungermannia sauteri De Not. ex Rabenh.
- Jungermannia scalariformis Nees
- Jungermannia scandens (Mont.) Hook.f. & Taylor
- Jungermannia schauliana Stephani
- Jungermannia schiffneri (Loitl.) A.Evans
- Jungermannia schistophila Spruce
- Jungermannia schizopleura Spruce
- Jungermannia schraderi Nees
- Jungermannia schultzii Spreng.
- Jungermannia schusterana J.D.Godfrey & G.Godfrey
- Jungermannia scolopendra Hook.
- Jungermannia scorpioides Reinw., Blume & Nees
- Jungermannia secunda Hampe ex Gottsche
- Jungermannia secundifolia Hook.f. & Taylor
- Jungermannia sehlmeyeri Huebener
- Jungermannia serpens Dumort.
- Jungermannia serpentina Nees
- Jungermannia serpillifolia Scop.
- Jungermannia serrata With.
- Jungermannia sessilis Spreng.
- Jungermannia sexplicata Stephani
- Jungermannia shimizuana Váňa
- Jungermannia sikkimensis Stephani
- Jungermannia sordida Nees
- Jungermannia sparsofolia C.Gao & J.Sun
- Jungermannia sphaerocarpa Hook.
- Jungermannia sphagnoides Schwägr.
- Jungermannia squarrosa Menzies ex Hook.
- Jungermannia squarrosula Hook.f. & Taylor
- Jungermannia stephanii (Schiffner) Amak.
- Jungermannia subapicaulis Nees
- Jungermannia subelliptica (Lindb. ex Heeg) Levier
- Jungermannia subinflata Spruce
- Jungermannia submersa Kremer
- Jungermannia subrubra Stephani
- Jungermannia subulata A.Evans
- Jungermannia superba Nees ex Spreng.
- Jungermannia tabularis Spreng.
- Jungermannia tamarisci L.
- Jungermannia taxifolia Wahlenb.
- Jungermannia tetragona Lindenb.
- Jungermannia thymifolia Nees
- Jungermannia torticalyx Stephani
- Jungermannia totopapillosa E.A.Hodgs.
- Jungermannia towadaensis (S.Okamura) S.Hatt.
- Jungermannia trichophylla L.
- Jungermannia trilobata L.
- Jungermannia truncata Nees
- Jungermannia tsukushiensis (Amak.) Amak.
- Jungermannia tuberculata Lehm.
- Jungermannia udarii S.C.Srivast. & P.Singh
- Jungermannia ulothrix Schwägr.
- Jungermannia ulvoides Reinw., Nees & Blume
- Jungermannia uncialis Hook.f. & Taylor
- Jungermannia uncifolia Stephani
- Jungermannia undulata L.
- Jungermannia unispiris (Amak.) Amak.
- Jungermannia ustulata Huebener
- Jungermannia vaginata Sw.
- Jungermannia varia L.
- Jungermannia ventroversa Grolle
- Jungermannia vernicosa Mérat
- Jungermannia verrucosa Stephani
- Jungermannia victoriensis (Bibby) E.A.Hodgs.
- Jungermannia virgata (Mitt.) Stephani
- Jungermannia viridis Spreng.
- Jungermannia viridula Nees
- Jungermannia viticulosa L.
- Jungermannia volkensii Stephani
- Jungermannia vulcanicola (Schiffner) Stephani
- Jungermannia wagneri Sveshn.
- Jungermannia wattiana Austin
- Jungermannia weddelliana Mont.
- Jungermannia yangii M.J.Lai
- Jungermannia zangmuii C.Gao & X.L.Bai
- Jungermannia zantenii Amak.
- Jungermannia zengii C.Gao & X.L.Bai
- Jungermannia zeyheri Huebener
