= Pseudolepicoleaceae =

Scientific classification
- Kingdom: Plantae
- Clade: Embryophytes
- Division: Marchantiophyta
- Class: Jungermanniopsida
- Order: Lepidoziales
- Family: Pseudolepicoleaceae; Fulford & J.Taylor 1960

Genera
- Archeophylla; Castanoclobos; Chaetocolea; Herzogiaria; Isophyllaria; Pseudolepicolea; Temnoma

Synonyms
- Herzogiariaceae; Chaetocoleaceae

Family of liverworts

Pseudolepicoleaceae is a family of liverworts in the order Lepidoziales. It has been placed in the order Jungermanniales.

== List of genera ==
- Archeophylla Schuster 1963
- Castanoclobos Engel & Glenny 2007
- Chaetocolea Spruce 1885
- Herzogiaria Fulford ex Hässel de Menendez 1981
- Isophyllaria Hodgson & Allison 1965 [Fulfordiella Hässel de Menendez 1974]
- Pseudolepicolea Fulford & Taylor 1960 [Archeochaete Schuster 1963; Lophochaete Schuster 1961]
- Temnoma Mitten 1867
