= Oil body =

Lipid-containing structure found in plant cells

An oil body is a lipid-containing structure found in plant cells. The term can refer to at least two distinct kinds of structures in different kinds of plants.

== In liverworts ==
Liverwort complex oil bodies are structures unique to liverworts that contain isoprenoid essential oils and are surrounded by a single membrane. The size, shape, color, and number of oil bodies per cell is characteristic of certain species and may be used to identify these.

== In vascular plants ==
Some species of vascular plants also contain intracellular structures called oil bodies. Vascular plant oil bodies consist mainly of triacylglycerols surrounded by a layer consisting of phospholipids and the protein oleosin. These oil bodies occur largely in seeds but also occur in other plant parts, including leaves.

== In seeds ==
Oil bodies are the organelle that has evolved to hold triglycerides in plant cells. They are therefore the principal store of chemical energy in oleaginous seeds. The structure and composition of plant seed oil bodies has been the subject of research from at least as far back as the 1980s, with several papers published in the 80s and 90s. Recent work, using updated techniques, has given a detailed molecular profile of oil bodies. It now seems that proteins out-number lipids on the surface of oil bodies, and that one protein in particular, called oleosin, dominates. The lipid and protein fractions of oil bodies are remarkable, because they maintain a coherent monolayer over a wide temperature and hydration range.

== Gallery ==
Microscopic views of liverwort cells, showing a variety of oil body shapes and arrangements.

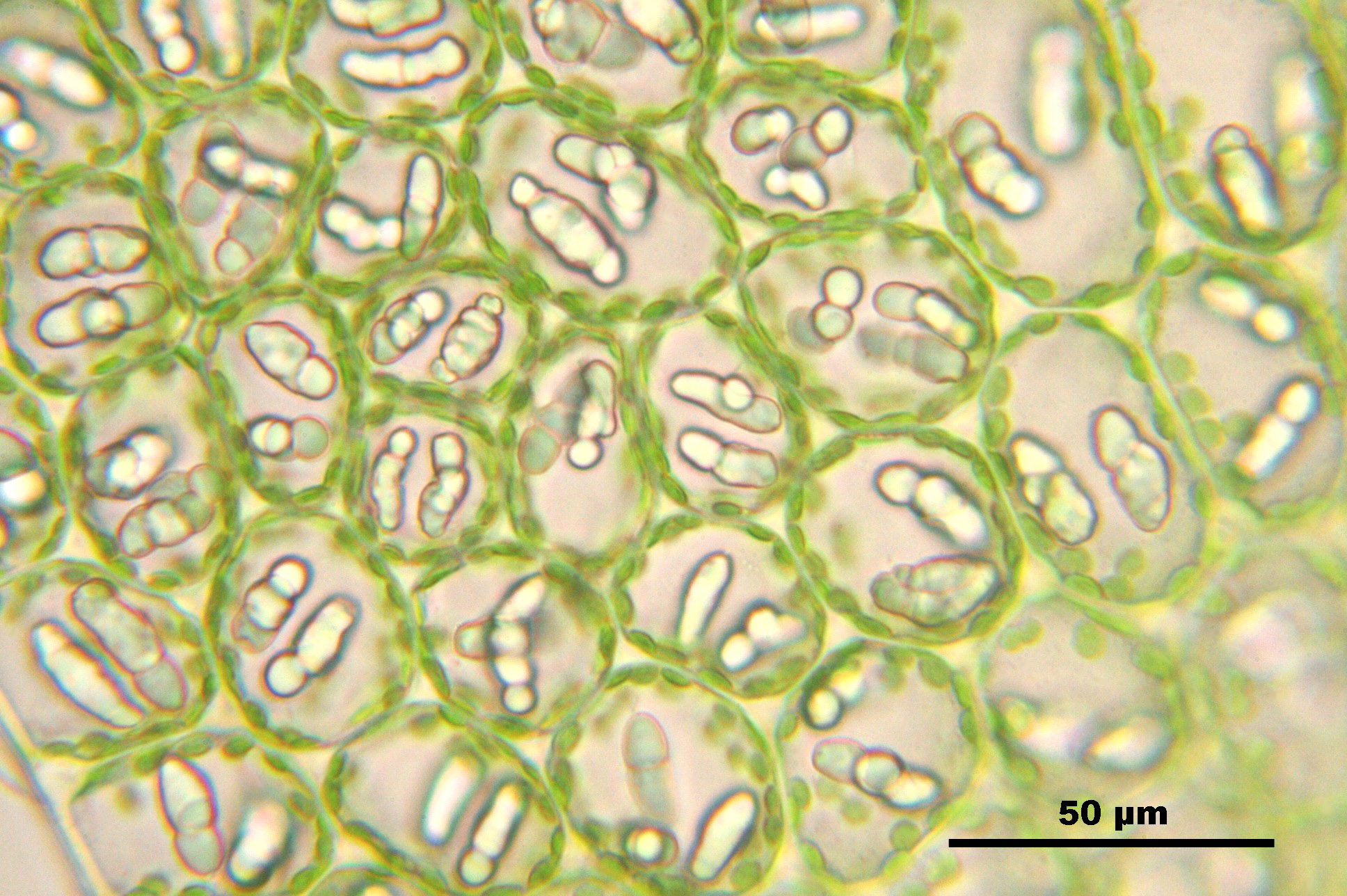
Nardia scalaris, a leafy liverwort

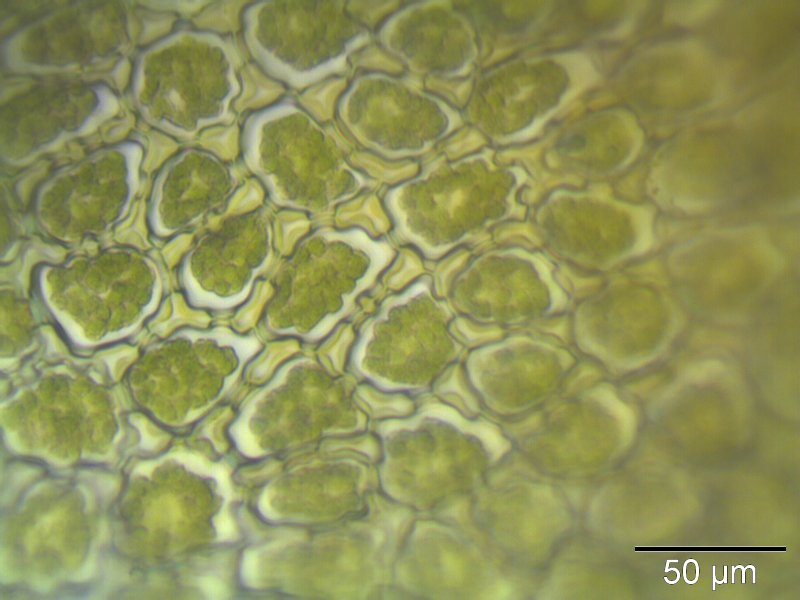
Ptilidium ciliare, a leafy liverwort

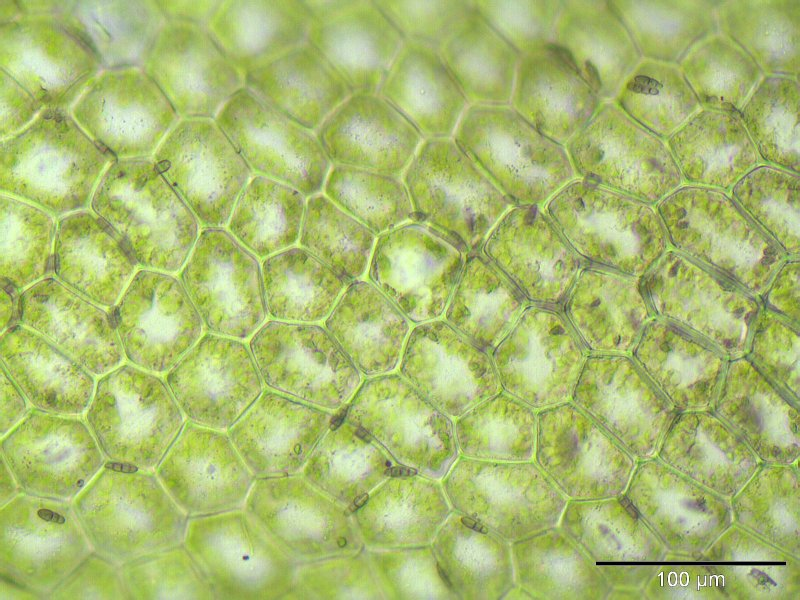
Chiloscyphus pallescens, a leafy liverwort

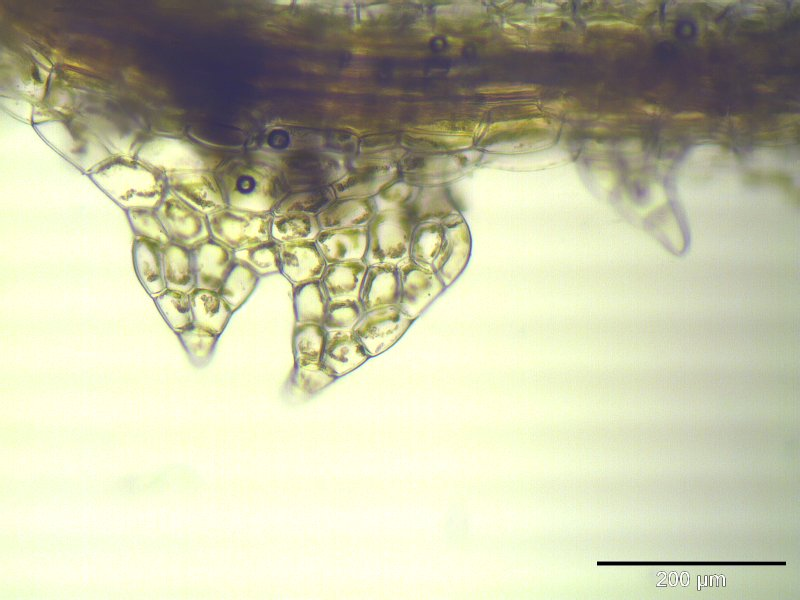
Cephalozia connivens, a leafy liverwort which lacks oil bodies

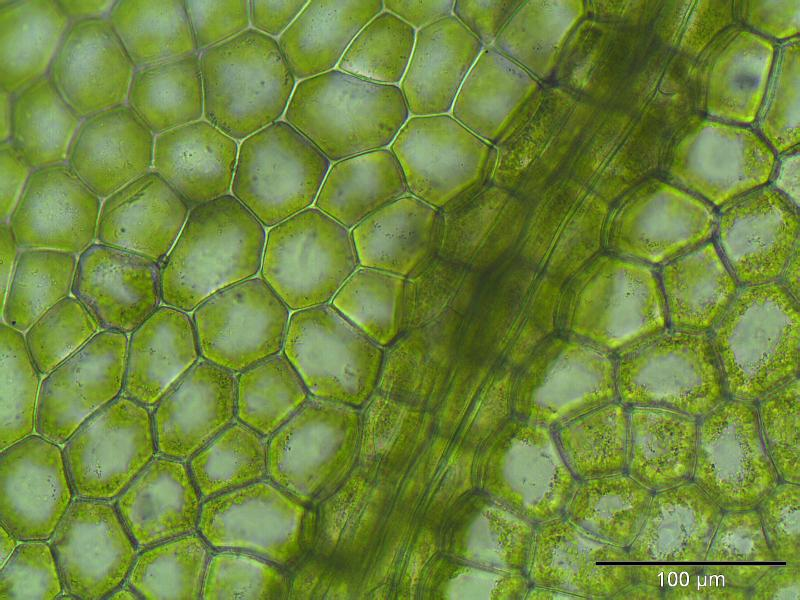
Metzgeria furcata, a thallose liverwort
