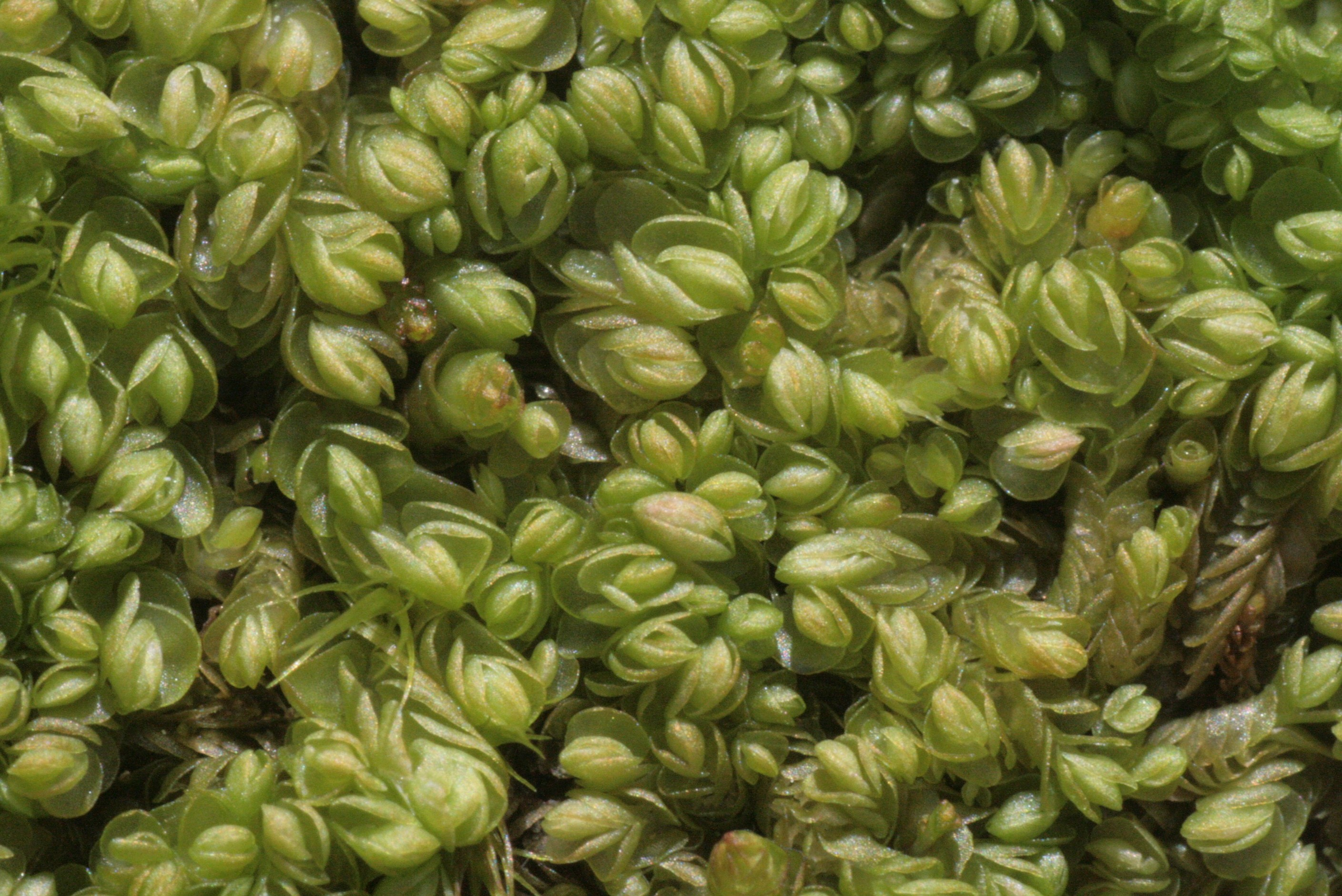
- Nardia scalaris

Scientific classification
- Kingdom: Plantae
- Division: Marchantiophyta
- Class: Jungermanniopsida
- Order: Jungermanniales
- Family: Solenostomataceae; Stotler & Crand.-Stotl., 2009

Genera
- See text

= Solenostomataceae =

Family of liverworts

Solenostomataceae is a family of liverworts in the order Jungermanniales.

== Genera ==
Genera included in Solenostomataceae:

- Aponardia (R.M.Schust) Váňa
- Arctoscyphus Hässel
- Cryptocolea R.M.Schust.
- Diplocolea Amakawa
- Solenostoma Mitt.
