= Geocalyx =

Scientific classification
- Kingdom: Plantae
- Division: Marchantiophyta
- Class: Jungermanniopsida
- Order: Jungermanniales
- Family: Geocalycaceae; H.Klinggr.
- Genus: Geocalyx; Nees

Genus of liverworts

Geocalyx is a genus of liverworts, the only genus in the family Geocalycaceae of the order Jungermanniales.

The genus has almost cosmopolitan distribution.

== Species ==
As accepted by GBIF;

- Geocalyx caledonicus Steph.
- Geocalyx graveolens (Schrad.) Nees
- Geocalyx heinrichsii T.Katag.
- Geocalyx lancistipulus (Steph.) S.Hatt.
- Geocalyx novaezelandiae Herzog
- Geocalyx orientalis Besch. & Spruce
- Geocalyx yakusimensis S.Hatt.
