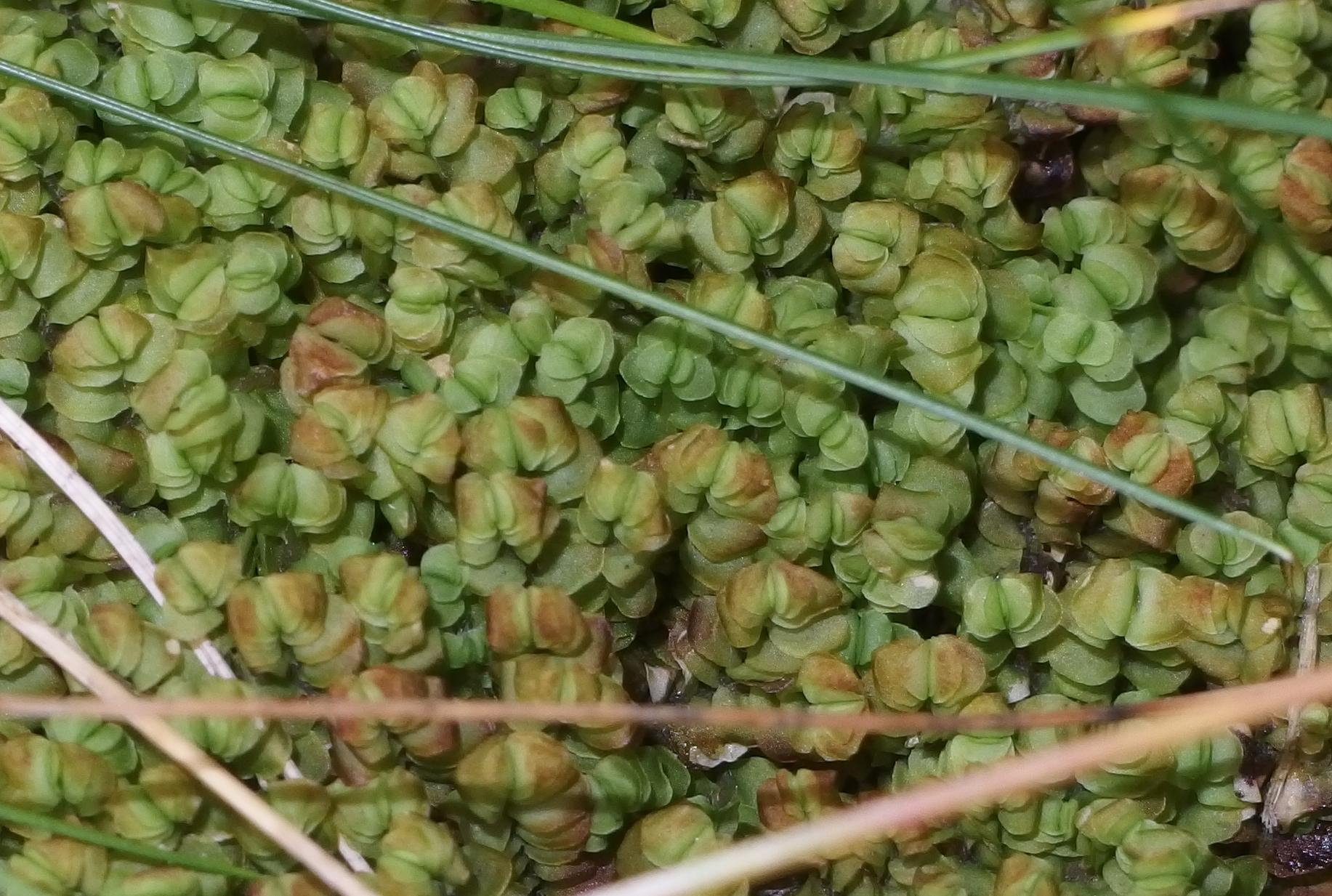
- Mylia taylorii

Scientific classification
- Kingdom: Plantae
- Division: Marchantiophyta
- Class: Jungermanniopsida
- Order: Myliales; J.J.Engl & Braggins ex Crand.-Stotl.
- Family: Myliaceae; Schljakov
- Genus: Mylia; Gray

Synonyms
- Coleochila Dumortier 1874; Leiomylia Engel & Braggins

= Mylia =

Genus of liverwort plants

Mylia is a genus of liverworts. It is the only genus in the family Myliaceae. While many species are green, some species may be brownish to reddish. The leaves are unlobed and have a smooth edge; the underleaves are tapered and narrow. Plants may have gemmae.

The species of this genus are found in Northern Hemisphere.

Species:

- Mylia aequata (Hook. & Taylor) Kuhnem.
- Mylia anomala (Hook.) Gray
- Mylia fragilis (J.B.Jack & Stephani) S.W.Arnell
- Mylia iversenii S.W.Arnell
- Mylia taylorii (Hook.) Gray
- Mylia verrucosa Lindb.
- Mylia vietnamica Bakalin & Vilnet
