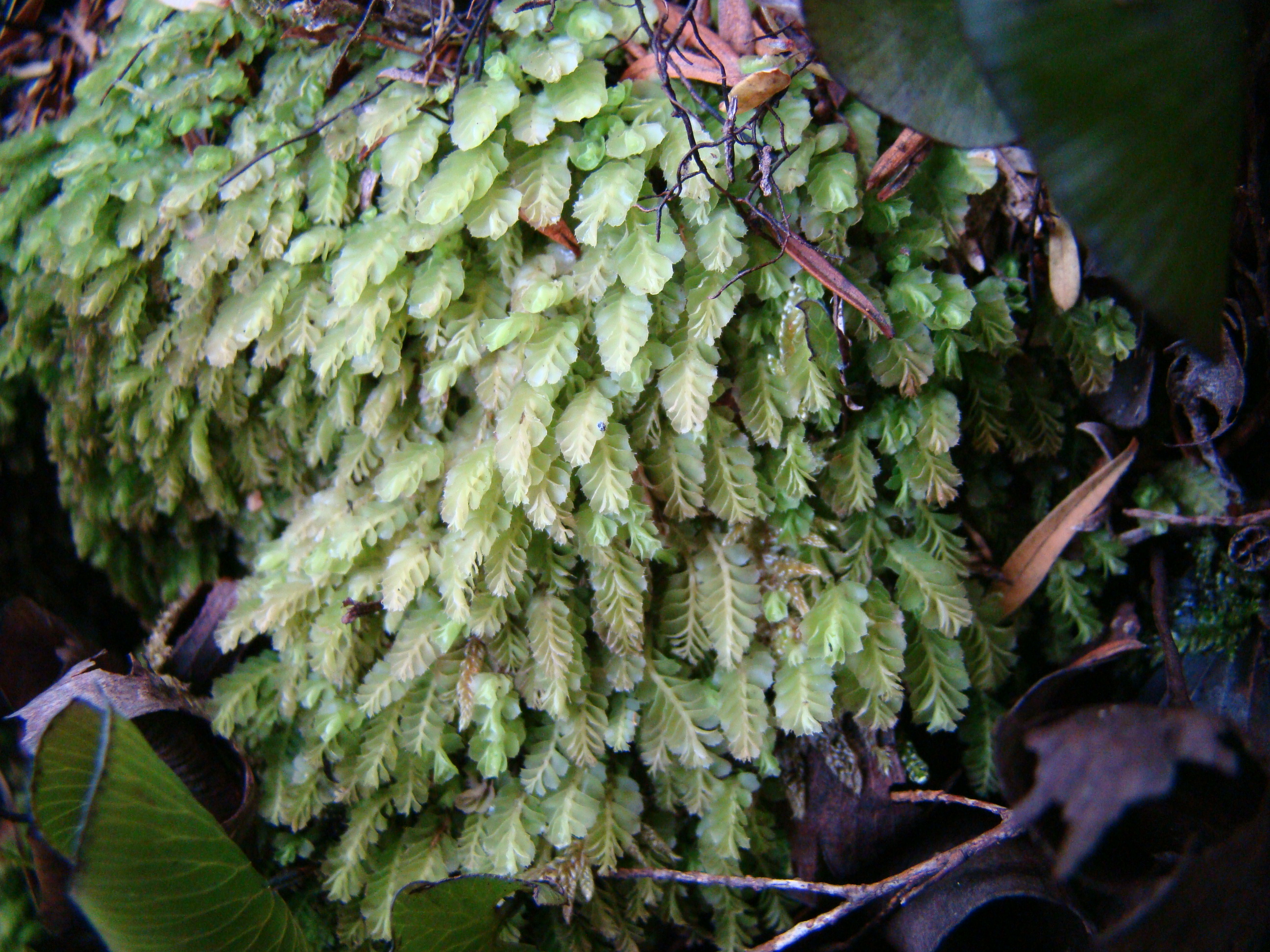
- Acrobolbus knightii

Scientific classification
- Kingdom: Plantae
- Division: Marchantiophyta
- Class: Jungermanniopsida
- Order: Jungermanniales
- Family: Acrobolbaceae; T.A.Hodgs.

Genera
- See text

= Acrobolbaceae =

Family of liverworts

Acrobolbaceae is liverwort family in the order Jungermanniales.

== Subfamilies and genera ==
Subfamilies and genera of Acrobolbaceae:

  - Enigmella G.A.M.Scott & K.G.Beckm. (not assigned to a subfamily)
- Acrobolboideae R.M.Schust. ex Briscoe
  - Acrobolbus Nees
- Austrolophozioideae R.M.Schust. ex Crand.-Stol.
  - Austrolophozia R.M.Schust.
  - Goebelobryum Grolle
- Lethocoleoideae Grolle
  - Lethocolea Mitt.
- Saccogynidioideae Crand.-Stotl.
  - Saccogynidium Grolle
