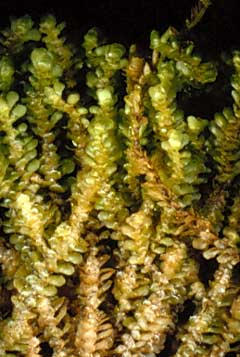
- A leafy liverwort, Scapania sp.

Scientific classification
- Kingdom: Plantae
- Clade: Embryophytes
- Division: Marchantiophyta
- Class: Jungermanniopsida
- Subclass: Jungermanniidae
- Order: Jungermanniales; H. Klinggr, 1858

Families
- See text.

= Jungermanniales =

Jungermanniales Temporal range: Upper Permian to recent

Order of liverworts

Jungermanniales is the largest order of liverworts. They are distinctive among the liverworts for having thin leaf-like flaps on either side of the stem. Most other liverworts are thalloid, with no leaves. Due to their dorsiventral organization and scale-like, overlapping leaves, the Jungermanniales are sometimes called "scale-mosses".

== Families of Jungermanniales ==
An updated classification by Söderström et al. 2016

- Cephaloziineae Schljakov [Jamesoniellineae]
  - Adelanthaceae Grolle 1972 [Jamesoniellaceae He-Nygrén et al. 2006]
  - Anastrophyllaceae Söderström et al. 2010b
  - Cephaloziaceae Migula 1904
  - Cephaloziellaceae Douin 1920 [Phycolepidoziaceae Schuster 1967]
  - Lophoziaceae Cavers 1910
  - Scapaniaceae Migula 1904 [Diplophyllaceae Potemk. 1999; Chaetophyllopsaceae Schuster 1960]
- Jungermanniineae Schuster ex Stotler & Crandall-Stotler 2000 [Geocalycineae Schuster 1972]
  - Acrobolbaceae Hodgson 1962
  - Antheliaceae Schuster 1963
  - Arnelliaceae Nakai 1943
  - Balantiopsidaceae Buch 1955
  - Blepharidophyllaceae Schuster 2002
  - Calypogeiaceae Arnell 1928 [Mizutaniaceae Furuki & Iwatsuki 1989]
  - Endogemmataceae Konstantinova, Vilnet & Troitsky 2011
  - Geocalycaceae von Klinggräff 1858
  - Gymnomitriaceae von Klinggräff 1858
  - Gyrothyraceae Schuster 1970
  - Harpanthaceae Arnell 1928
  - Hygrobiellaceae Konstantinova & Vilnet 2014
  - Jackiellaceae Schuster 1972
  - Jungermanniaceae Reichenbach 1828 [Mesoptychiaceae Inoue & Steere 1975; Delavayellaceae Schuster 1961]
  - Notoscyphaceae Crandall-Stotler, Vana & Stotler
  - Saccogynaceae Heeg
  - Solenostomataceae Stotler & Crandall-Stotler 2009
  - Southbyaceae Váňa et al. 2012
  - Stephaniellaceae Schuster 2002
  - Trichotemnomataceae Schuster 1972
- Lophocoleineae Schljakov 1972 [Pseudolepicoleineae; Trichocoleineae]
  - Blepharostomataceae Frey & Stech 2008
  - Brevianthaceae Engel & Schuster 1981
  - Chonecoleaceae Schuster ex Grolle 1972
  - Grolleaceae Solari ex Schuster 1984
  - Herbertaceae Müller ex Fulford & Hatcher 1958
  - Lepicoleaceae Schuster 1963 [Vetaformataceae Fulford & Taylor 1963]
  - Lepidoziaceae Limpricht 1877 [Neogrollaceae]
  - Lophocoleaceae Vanden Berghen 1956
  - Mastigophoraceae Schuster 1972
  - Plagiochilaceae Müller & Herzog 1956
  - Pseudolepicoleaceae Fulford & Taylor 1960
  - Trichocoleaceae Nakai 1943
- Myliineae Engel & Braggins ex Crandall-Stotler et al.
  - Myliaceae Schljakov 1975
- Perssoniellineae Schuster 1963
  - Schistochilaceae Buch 1928 [Perssoniellaceae Schuster ex Grolle 1972]
