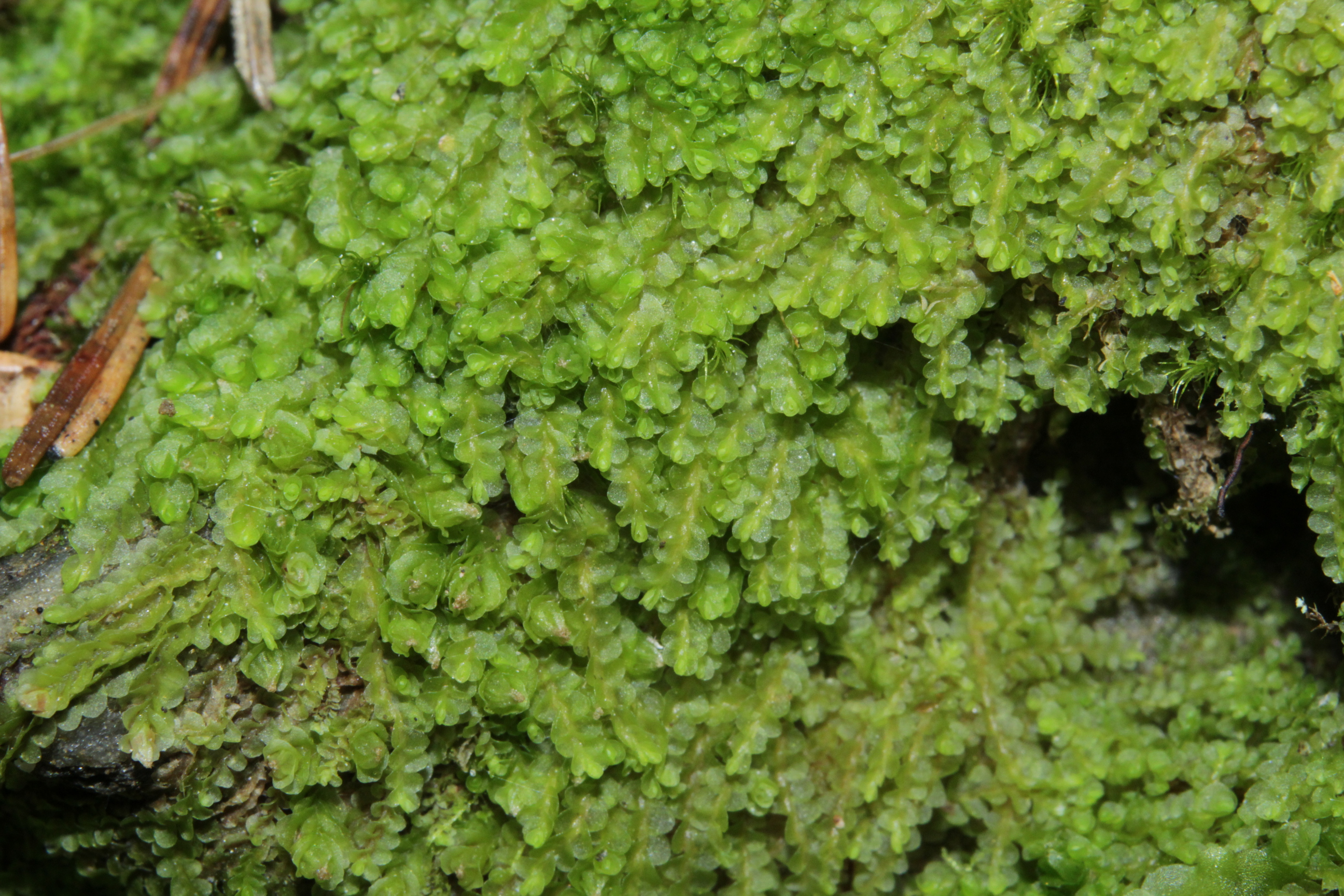
- Jungermannia hyalina

Scientific classification
- Kingdom: Plantae
- Division: Marchantiophyta
- Class: Jungermanniopsida; Stotler & Stotl.-Crand., 1977 emend. 2000

Orders
- Jungermanniidae; Jungermanniales; Porellales; Ptilidiales; Metzgeriidae; Metzgeriales; Pleuroziales; Pelliidae; Fossombroniales; Pallaviciniales; Pelliales

= Jungermanniopsida =

Class of liverworts

Jungermanniopsida is the largest of three classes within the division Marchantiophyta (liverworts).

== Phylogeny ==
Based on the work by Novíkov & Barabaš-Krasni 2015.

- - Pelliidae
    - Pelliales
    - - Pallaviciniales
      - Fossombroniales
  - - Metzgeriidae
      - Pleuroziales
      - Metzgeriales
    - Jungermanniidae
      - Porellales
      - - Ptilidiales
        - Jungermanniales

== Taxonomy ==
- Jungermanniidae Engler 1893
  - Jungermanniales von Klinggräff 1858
    - Cephaloziineae Schljakov
      - Adelanthaceae Grolle 1972 [Jamesoniellaceae He-Nygrén et al. 2006]
      - Anastrophyllaceae Söderström et al. 2010b
      - Cephaloziaceae Migula 1904
      - Cephaloziellaceae Douin 1920 [Phycolepidoziaceae Schuster 1967]
      - Lophoziaceae Cavers 1910
      - Scapaniaceae Migula 1904 [Diplophyllaceae Potemk. 1999; Chaetophyllopsaceae Schuster 1960]
    - Jungermanniineae Schuster ex Stotler & Crandall-Stotler 2000
      - Acrobolbaceae Hodgson 1962
      - Antheliaceae Schuster 1963
      - Arnelliaceae Nakai 1943
      - Balantiopsidaceae Buch 1955 [Isotachidaceae]
      - Blepharidophyllaceae Schuster 2002
      - Calypogeiaceae Arnell 1928 [Mizutaniaceae Furuki & Iwatsuki 1989]
      - Endogemmataceae Konstantinova, Vilnet & Troitsky 2011
      - Geocalycaceae von Klinggräff 1858
      - Gymnomitriaceae von Klinggräff 1858
      - Gyrothyraceae Schuster 1970
      - Harpanthaceae Arnell 1928
      - Hygrobiellaceae Konstantinova & Vilnet 2014
      - Jackiellaceae Schuster 1972
      - Jungermanniaceae Reichenbach 1828 [Mesoptychiaceae Inoue & Steere 1975; Delavayellaceae Schuster 1961]
      - Notoscyphaceae Crandall-Stotler, Vana & Stotler
      - Saccogynaceae Heeg
      - Solenostomataceae Stotler & Crandall-Stotler 2009
      - Southbyaceae Váňa et al. 2012
      - Stephaniellaceae Schuster 2002
      - Trichotemnomataceae Schuster 1972
    - Lophocoleineae Schljakov 1972
      - Blepharostomataceae Frey & Stech 2008
      - Brevianthaceae Engel & Schuster 1981
      - Chonecoleaceae Schuster ex Grolle 1972
      - Grolleaceae Solari ex Schuster 1984
      - Herbertaceae Müller ex Fulford & Hatcher 1958
      - Lepicoleaceae Schuster 1963 [Vetaformataceae Fulford & Taylor 1963]
      - Lepidoziaceae Limpricht 1877 [Neogrollaceae]
      - Lophocoleaceae Vanden Berghen 1956
      - Mastigophoraceae Schuster 1972
      - Plagiochilaceae Müller & Herzog 1956
      - Pseudolepicoleaceae Fulford & Taylor 1960 [Herzogiariaceae; Chaetocoleaceae]
      - Trichocoleaceae Nakai 1943
    - Myliineae Engel & Braggins ex Crandall-Stotler et al.
      - Myliaceae Schljakov 1975
    - Perssoniellineae Schuster 1963
      - Schistochilaceae Buch 1928 [Perssoniellaceae Schuster ex Grolle 1972]
  - Porellales Schljakov 1972
    - Jubulineae Müller 1909
      - Frullaniaceae Lorch 1914
      - Jubulaceae von Klinggräff 1858
      - Lejeuneaceae Cavers 1910 [Metzgeriopsaceae]
    - Porellineae Schuster 1963
      - Goebeliellaceae Verdoorn 1932
      - Lepidolaenaceae Nakai 1943 [Jubulopsaceae]
      - Porellaceae Cavers 1910 nom. cons. [Macvicariaceae]
    - Radulineae Schuster 1963
      - Radulaceae Müller 1909
  - Ptilidiales Schljakov 1972
    - Herzogianthaceae Stotler & Crandall-Stotler 2009
    - Neotrichocoleaceae Inoue 1974
    - Ptilidiaceae von Klinggräff 1858
- Metzgeriidae Bartholomew-Began 1990
  - Metzgeriales Chalaud 1930
    - Aneuraceae von Klinggräff 1858 [Riccardiaceae; Verdoorniaceae Inoue 1976]
    - Metzgeriaceae von Klinggräff 1858 [Vandiemeniaceae Hewson]
  - Pleuroziales Schljakov 1972
    - Pleuroziaceae Müller 1909
- Pelliidae He-Nygrén et al. 2006
  - Fossombroniales Schljakov 1972
    - Calyculariineae He-Nygrén et al. 2006
      - Calyculariaceae He-Nygrén et al. 2006
    - Fossombroniineae Schuster ex Stotler & Crandall-Stotler 2000 [Codoniineae]
      - Allisoniaceae Schljakov 1975
      - Fossombroniaceae Hazsl. nom. cons. 1885 [Codoniaceae]
      - Petalophyllaceae Stotler & Crandall-Stotler 2002
    - Makinoiineae He-Nygrén et al. 2006
      - Makinoaceae Nakai 1943
  - Pallaviciniales Frey & Stech 2005
    - Pallaviciniineae Schuster 1984
      - Hymenophytaceae Schuster 1963
      - Moerckiaceae Stotler & Crandall-Stotler 2007
      - Pallaviciniaceae Migula 1904 [Dilaenaceae Müller 1940; Symphyogynaceae Reimers 1952]
      - Sandeothallaceae Schuster 1984
    - Phyllothalliineae Schuster 1967
      - Phyllothalliaceae Hodgson 1964
  - Pelliales He-Nygrén et al. 2006
    - Noterocladaceae Frey & Stech 2005
    - Pelliaceae von Klinggräff 1858
