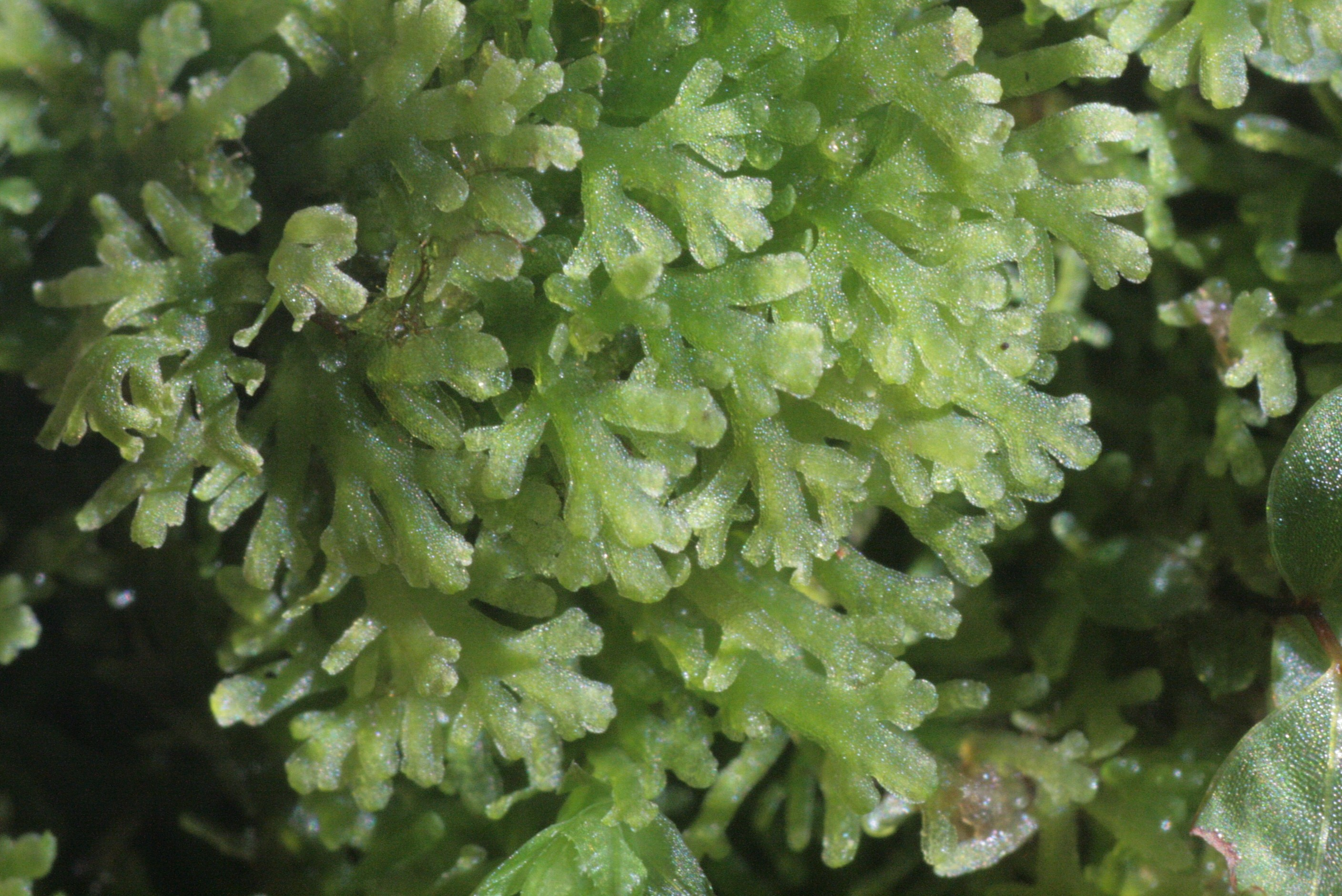
- Riccardia multifida

Scientific classification
- Kingdom: Plantae
- Division: Marchantiophyta
- Class: Jungermanniopsida
- Subclass: Metzgeriidae
- Order: Metzgeriales; Chalaud, 1930

Families
- Aneuraceae; Metzgeriaceae † Metzgeriites See also classification.

Synonyms
- Anacrogynae (various authors); Frondosae Endlicher, 1841

= Metzgeriales =

Metzgeriales Temporal range: Upper Devonian to recent

Order of liverwort plants

Metzgeriales is an order of liverworts. The group is sometimes called the simple thalloid liverworts: "thalloid" because the members lack structures resembling stems or leaves, and "simple" because their tissues are thin and relatively undifferentiated. All species in the order have a small gametophyte stage and a smaller, relatively short-lived, spore-bearing stage. Although these plants are almost entirely restricted to regions with high humidity or readily available moisture, the group as a whole is widely distributed, and occurs on every continent except Antarctica.

== Description ==
Members of the Metzgeriales typically are small and thin enough to be translucent, with most of the tissues only a single cell layer in thickness. Because these plants are thin and relatively undifferentiated, with little evidence of distinct tissues, the Metzgeriales are sometimes called the "simple thalloid liverworts".

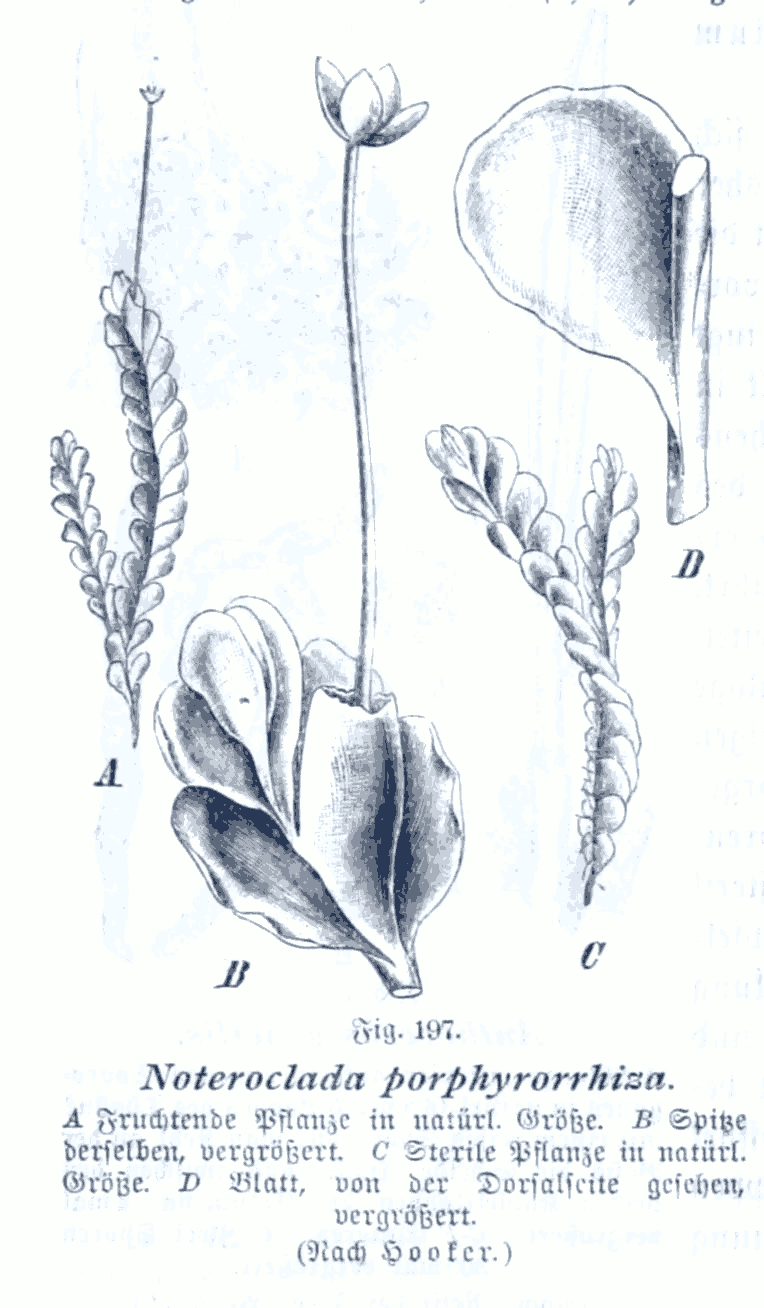
Noteroclada, a "leafy" member of the Metzgeriales

There is considerable diversity in vegetative structure of the Metzgeriales. As a rule, simple thalloid liverworts do not have structures resembling leaves. However, a few genera, such as Fossombronia, and Symphyogyna, are "semileafy" and have a thallus that is very deeply lobed, thus giving the appearance of leafiness. The genus Phyllothallia has a more striking leafiness, with paired lobes of tissue spaced regularly at swollen nodes along a central, forked stem. The several semileafy groups within the Metzgeriales are not closely related to each other, and the currently accepted view is that the leafy condition evolved separately and independently in each of the groups where it occurs.

Members of the Metzgeriales also differ from the related Jungermanniales in the location of their archegonia (female reproductive structures). Whereas archegonia in the Jungermanniales develop directly from the apical cell at the tip of a fertile branch, archegonia in the Metzgeriales develop from a cell that is behind the apical cell. As a result, the female reproductive organs, and the sporophytes that develop within them, are always located on the dorsal surface of the plant. Because these structures do not develop at the apex of the branch, their development in the Metzgeriales is described as anacrogynous, from Greek ἀν- (an-, "not") + ἄκρος (akros, "tip") + γυνή (gynē, “female”). The group was accordingly known as the Anacrogynae prior to being recognized as a separate order.

== Distribution and ecology ==
Although these plants are almost entirely restricted to regions with high humidity or readily available moisture, the group as a whole is widely distributed, and occurs on every continent except Antarctica.

One simple thalloid liverwort is not photosynthetic. The species Cryptothallus mirabilis is white as a result of lacking chlorophyll, and has plastids that do not differentiate into chloroplasts. This species is a myco-heterotroph that obtains its nutrients from fungi growing among its tissues. These plants grow in bogs and are typically found under peat moss near birch trees.

== Classification ==
The beginning of modern liverwort nomenclature is marked with the 1753 publication of Linnaeus' Species Plantarum, although this relied heavily upon the prior work of Micheli (1729) and Dillenius (1741). Linnaeus included all 25 known species of liverworts, together with mosses, algae, and fungi, within a single class Cryptogamia. Linnaeus' system was heavily revised by workers in the early nineteenth century, so that by the time Endlicher published his Enchiridion Botanicum in 1841, five orders of liverworts were defined, and the "Frondosae" were segregated as a group that is congruent with the modern concept of the Metzgeriales. Endlicher's "Frondosae" included five subgroups (Metzgerieae, Aneureae, Haplolaeneae, Diplomitrieae, and Codonieae) with no assigned taxonomic rank, but these groups were termed Familien by Dědeček in 1886. The same five subgroups of "Frondosae", without significant change, were used in the Synopsis Hepaticarum of Gottsche, Lindenberg, and Nees.

A more thorough understanding of the Metzgeriales was not achieved until the morphological and developmental work of Leitgeb in the late nineteenth century. Leitgeb was among the first to recognize and appreciate the significance of development and reproductive morphology as a guide to distinguishing liverwort groups. His careful examinations guided revisions made in the classification published from 1893 to 1895 by Schiffner in Engler and Prantl. Schiffner thus divided his "Jungermanniales" into two broad groups according to whether the archegonia were terminal on reproductive branches (Jungermanniales akrogynae) or sub-terminal (Jungermanniales anakrogynae). This latter group included what are now recognized as the Metzgeriales, Sphaerocarpales, and Haplomitriales.

The simple thalloids were not given ordinal status until 1930 by Chalaud. Although subsequent systems similarly treated the group as distinct, the name of the order was more often given as "Jungermanniales anacrogynae" (or similar), or the group was retained within the Jungermanniales as a suborder with either this name or the name "Metzgerineae". The highly influential and comprehensive 1966 classification found in Schuster's Hepaticae and Anthocerotae of North America firmly established the name "Metzgeriales" for the group, although he had used this name in his earlier works. Schuster revised his system in 1972 and again in 1984. The only change he made in the circumscription of the Metzgeriales was to remove the Treubiales in accordance with that change made in the classification of Schljakov.

Schljakov's 1972 classification had elevated several subordinal groups within the simple thalloids to the rank of order, and treated the Metzgeriales itself as a superorder "Metzgerianae", but Schuster's 1984 system rejected most of these changes. The classification of Crandall-Stotler and Stotler (2000) adopted several of Schljakov's orders, while revising their membership and grouping them within a subclass "Metzgeriidae". These changes reflected a morphological analysis of species that had been presented three years earlier. Although their system changed the rank and the Latin ending of the name, the composition was identical to the Metzgeriales of Schuster (1966), with only the addition of the Haplomitriales to its membership. Subsequent studies incorporating DNA sequence analysis have removed the Haplomitriales, Treubiales, and Blasiales and place those taxa elsewhere. The remnant of the group, after the removal of these taxa, consists of their Metzgeriales (7 families), Fossombroniales (4 families), and the Phyllothalliaceae.

=== Families ===
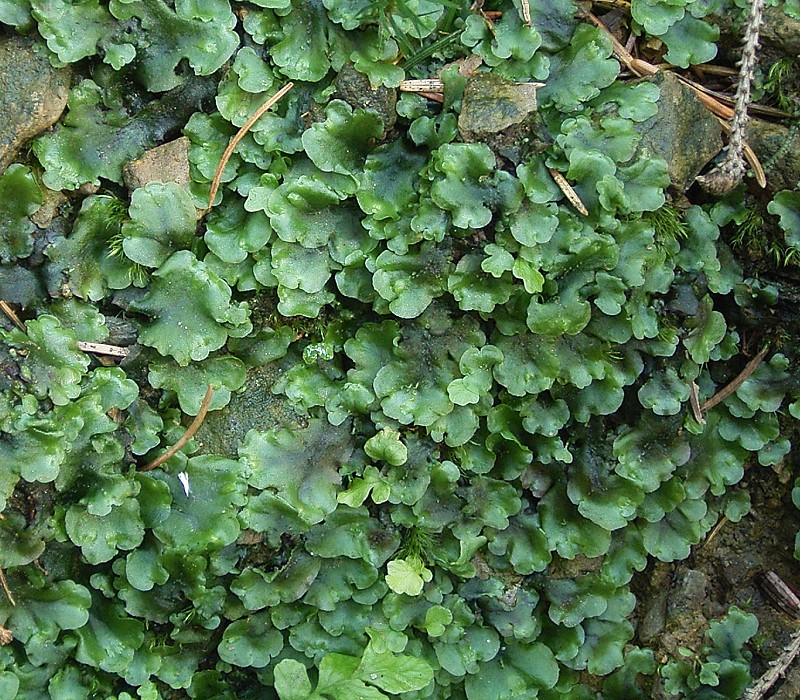
Pellia epiphylla

The Metzgeriales traditionally included fourteen families, as follows:

- Allisoniaceae ^{*}
- Aneuraceae
- Calyculariaceae ^{*}
- Fossombroniaceae ^{*}
- Hymenophytaceae
- Makinoaceae
- Metzgeriaceae
- Mizutaniaceae
- Moerckiaceae
- Pallaviciniaceae
- Pelliaceae ^{*}
- Petalophyllaceae ^{*}
- Phyllothalliaceae
- Sandeothallaceae ^{*}

Families marked with an asterisk ^{*} were classified in the separate order Fossombroniales by Crandall-Stotler and Stotler, but this grouping is not supported by subsequent analysis using DNA sequences.

Two additional families were formerly included within the Metzgeriales, but since have been transferred to other classes of liverwort. The Blasiaceae has been assigned its own order Blasiales, and phylogenetic studies show that it is more closely related to the Marchantiales than to members of the Metzgeriales. Likewise, the Treubiaceae is now in its own order Treubiales, within the recently recognized class Haplomitriopsida.

A 2016 analysis of liverwort classification has further reduced the Metzgeriales to include only two families, Metzgeriaceae and Aneuraceae, with all other previously included families dispersed into three additional orders: Fossombroniales, Pallaviciniales, and Pelliales.

Families reassigned in the 2016 analysis:

- Allisoniaceae - Fossombroniales
- Calyculariaceae - Fossombroniales
- Fossombroniaceae - Fossombroniales
- Hymenophytaceae - Pallaviciniales
- Makinoaceae - Fossombroniales
- Mizutaniaceae - Jungermanniales
- Moerckiaceae - Pallaviciniales
- Pallaviciniaceae - Pallaviciniales
- Pelliaceae - Pelliales
- Petalophyllaceae - Fossombroniales
- Phyllothalliaceae - Pallaviciniales
- Sandeothallaceae - Pallaviciniales

=== Botanical authority ===
In previous decades, there has been considerable confusion over the correct attribution of the name "Metzgeriales". The ordinal name Metzgeriales was first published by Chalaud in 1930 with the description “J’ai désigné très généralement les Jungermannniales anacrogynes sous le nom de Metzgériales,” (that is: "I have designated very generally the Jungermannniales anacrogynes under the name of Metzgeriales"). Chalaud cited Underwood 1894 in support of his treatment, but Underwood himself used only the name Metzgeriaceae for the group, and considered the whole to represent a single family. The publication of the ordinal name by Chalaud was accepted as correct by Grolle in his 1983 synopsis of the generic and higher-rank names of liverworts.

Writing in 1984, Rudolf M. Schuster questioned the correct authority for the ordinal name. He believed that Underwood had first used the term, but concluded that as neither Underwood nor Chalaud had provided a formal description, the order should be cited as "Metzgeriales Schust. emend. Schljak." He ascribed first use of the name with a description to his own 1953 work on the liverworts of Minnesota. This work included a considerable description sufficient to distinguish the order from all others, but Schuster relied on the 1972 emendation by Schljakov to provide the Latin diagnosis required by the International Code of Botanical Nomenclature. Schuster reaffirmed his position on the authority for publication in 1992.

In the publication of their revised liverwort classification in 2000, Crandall-Stotler and Stotler agreed with Schuster as to the attribution of the name, although they restricted their circumscription of the order considerably. However, upon additional review of the Chalaud paper, they reversed their opinion. They concluded that Chalaud's diagnosis, although "terse", was nonetheless adequate to satisfy the requirements for publication of a botanical name, and that the Code's requirement for a Latin diagnosis did not apply, since the Chalaud paper was published prior to 1 January 1935. Chalaud is therefore the correct authority in citing the name "Metzgeriales".

== Evolution ==
=== Phylogeny ===
The Metzgeriales are a paraphyletic group of liverworts, in that they do not include all the descendants of their most recent common ancestor. Specifically, the Jungermanniales (leafy liverworts) are more closely related to the Aneuraceae and Metzgeriaceae than are other simple thalloid groups.

The diagram at right summarizes a portion of a 2006 cladistic analysis of liverworts based upon three chloroplast genes, one nuclear gene, and one mitochondrial gene. The genus Sandeothallus and the species Mizutania riccardioides and Vandiemenia ratkowskiana (each the only member of its respective family) were not included in the study.

Linked names at the tips of clade branches are families currently assigned to the Metzgeriales. Names which are not linked belong to other groups. The results agree with the view that the Metzgeriales are paraphyletic as a result of including neither the Jungermanniales nor Pleuroziaceae (both shown in bold), which nest among the simple thalloid liverworts.

- Marchantiophyta
  - - Haplomitriopsida
      - Haplomitriales
      - Treubiales
  - - Marchantiopsida
      - Blasiales
      - - Sphaerocarpales
        - Marchantiales
    - Jungermanniopsida
      - - **Jungermanniales**
        - - **Pleuroziaceae**
          - - Aneuraceae
            - Metzgeriaceae
      - - Pelliaceae
        - - Calyculariaceae
          - - - Makinoaceae
              - - Allisoniaceae
                - Fossombroniaceae
                - Petalophyllaceae
            - - Phyllothalliaceae
              - - Hymenophytaceae
                - Moerckiaceae
                - Pallaviciniaceae
                - Sandeothallaceae

=== Fossil record ===
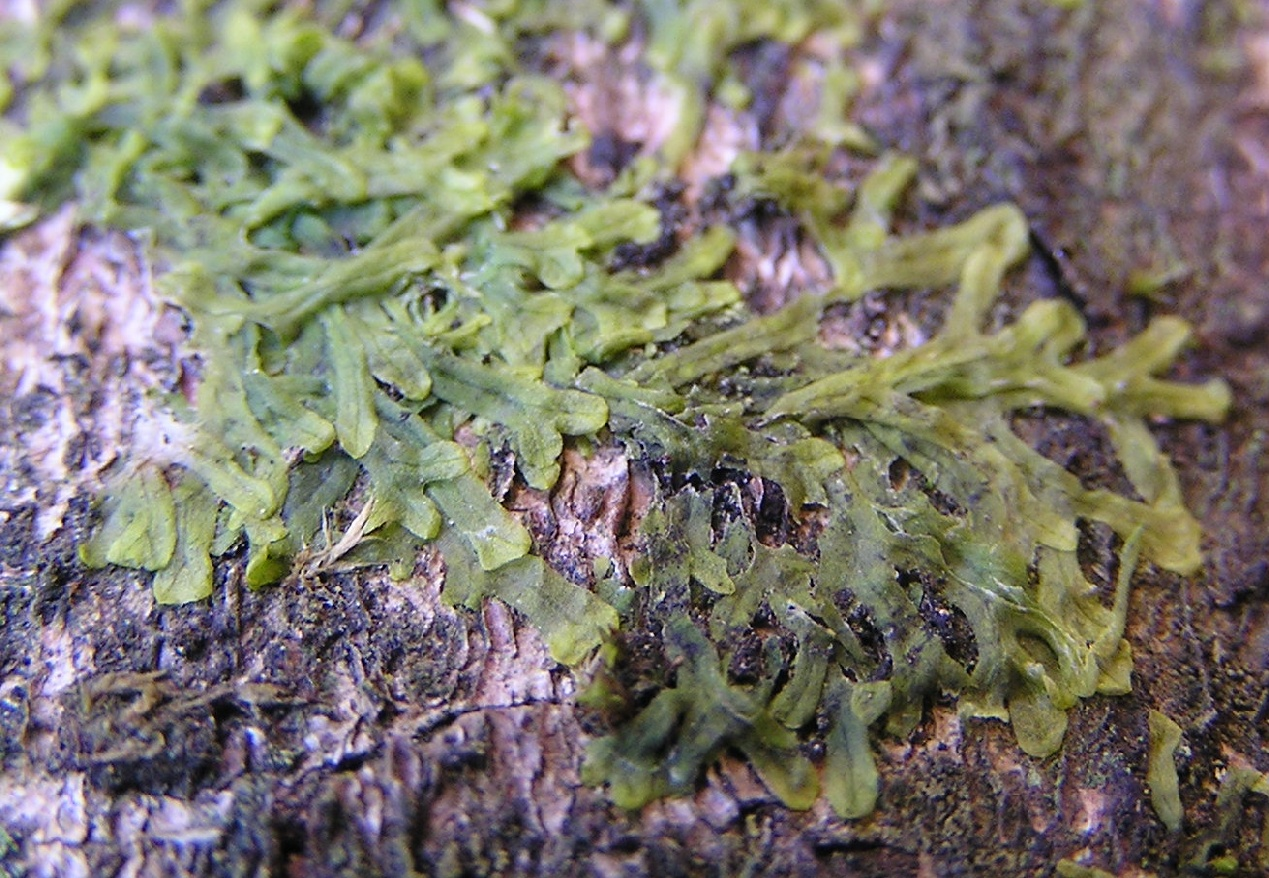
Metzgeria furcata

Because plants belonging to the Metgeriales lack hard tissues, and the plants often decay or die back, preservation of fossils is dependent upon rapid burial by floods or volcanic ash. Bryophytes are considered "delicate" plants, and this characteristic is often cited as the reason for the apparently poor fossil record of the group. However, fossils of the Metzgeriales are distributed widely, both geographically and stratigraphically, and the fossils which have been found are often highly detailed and well-preserved.

The oldest fossil bryophyte is a compression fossil of Pallavicinites devonicus from Upper Devonian rocks that has been confidently assigned to the Metzgeriales. Portions of the fossil that have been isolated for microscopic examination reveal an extraordinary degree of cellular detail. The plant consisted of a thin, ribbon-like, bifurcating thallus with a thicker central midrib. The plant is remarkably similar in structure to members of the extant liverwort family Pallaviciniaceae, but no reproductive structures have been found. Additional species assigned to the genus Pallavicinites have been found in rocks dating from the Carboniferous to the Pleistocene.

Another early fossil probably belonging to the Metzgeriales is the Carboniferous fossil Thallites willsi, which has been compared to the modern genus Metzgeria. However, it has been assigned to the form genus Thallites, which is used for thalloid fossil plants and algae of uncertain relationships. Most fossils belonging to the Metzgeriales are assigned to the genus Metzgeriites, which was established for this purpose. Specimens from the Upper Carboniferous of Shropshire, England, have been named Hepaticites metzgerioides, and (as the specific epithet indicates) these specimens strongly resemble the genus Metzgeria. However, they have been placed instead in the form genus Hepaticites, used for fossils believed to be liverworts but without confident affiliation with any extant order. This species is not restricted to British localities, but has also been found in the Karagandy Province of Kazakhstan.

Mesozoic fossils of Metzgeriites have also been found. Metzgeriites glebosus has been collected from Jurassic strata of Greenland. The type material, and so far only material collected, consists of a midrib with a thin lamina that is deeply and irregularly lobed. A Cretaceous fossil from Portugal has been named Metzgeriites infracretaceus. Like M. glebosus, it possesses a midrib and thin lamina, but unlike that taxon the lamina of M. infracretaceus is not lobed.
