= Petalophyllum americanum =

Scientific classification
- Kingdom: Plantae
- Clade: Embryophytes
- Division: Marchantiophyta
- Class: Jungermanniopsida
- Order: Fossombroniales
- Family: Petalophyllaceae
- Genus: Petalophyllum
- Species: P. americanum

Binomial name
- Petalophyllum americanum C.H. Ford & Crandall-Stotler, 2002

Species of liverwort

Petalophyllum americanum, common name petalwort, is a species of liverwort in the order Fossombroniales. It is endemic to the Gulf Coast of the United States in Arkansas, Louisiana, Mississippi, and Texas. It was first described as the European species Petalophyllum ralfsii in 1919, but a detailed study later showed that the North American form is a distinct species.

Petalophyllum americanum lives among grasses on sandy, seasonally dry soils of disturbed sites such as pastures, cemeteries, and parks, where it is commonly associated with the liverworts Riccia, Fossombronia, and Corsinia. The plants are thallose; that is, the plant is not differentiated into root, stem, and leaf. The thallus is small, typically about 8 mm long by 6.5 mm wide (0.3 in by 0.25 in), and consists of a midrib flanked by two wings that bear leaf-like lamellae on the dorsal surface.
