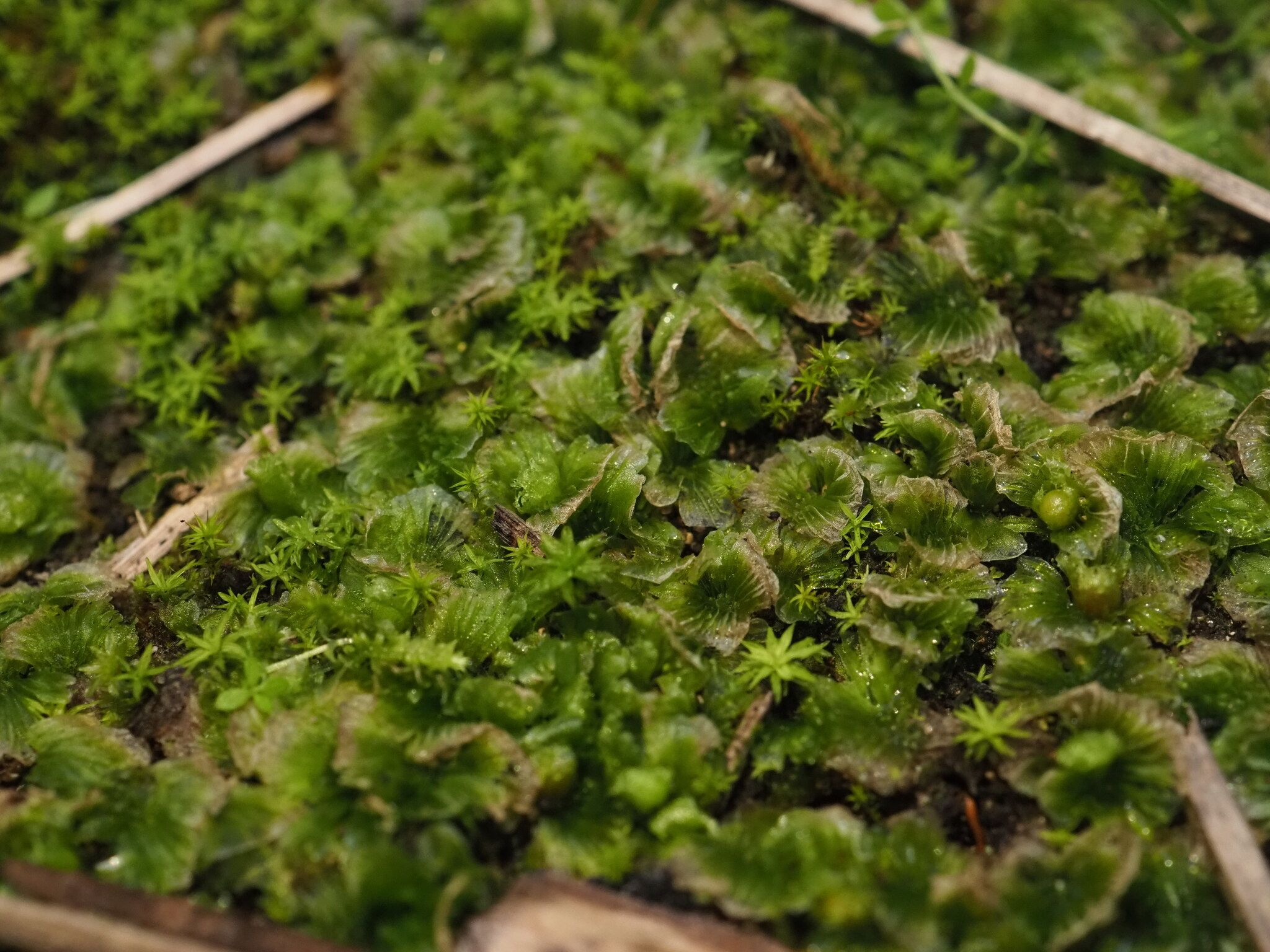

Conservation status
- Nationally Critical (NZ TCS)

Scientific classification
- Kingdom: Plantae
- Division: Marchantiophyta
- Class: Jungermanniopsida
- Order: Fossombroniales
- Family: Petalophyllaceae
- Genus: Petalophyllum
- Species: P. preissii

Binomial name
- Petalophyllum preissii Lehm.

= Petalophyllum preissii =

Lettuce liverwort

Species of liverwort

Petalophyllum preissii, the lettuce liverwort, is a species of liverwort that is the type species of the family Petalophyllaceae. It is found in Australia and New Zealand, and is at risk of extinction in both countries.

== Description ==
Petalophyllum preissii is a species that forms a rosette with radiating ruffles of tissue on the upper side of the thallus that gives it a scale-like appearance. The thallus is roughly as long as it is wide, and the rhizoids of the species are clear or brown.In its original description, the similarity of P. preissii to Fossombronia pusilla was noted, especially among male and young specimens. It can be told apart from species in Fossombronia because they have much more narrow thalli, and lack a scaly upper side. The elater cells in the sporophyte are thinner than those of its sister species Petalophyllum ralfsii.

== Taxonomy ==
Petalophyllum preissii was described alongside P. ralfsii as founding members of the genus Petalophyllum by Johann Georg Christian Lehmann in 1844. However, it was never clear which species was the type species of the genus. In 1972, P. preissii was explicitly selected as the type for the first time, and has been used as such since then.

A 2014 report rejected Petalophyllum australe and treated it as a synonym of P. preissii.

== Ecology ==
Lettuce liverwort is one of only a few hornwort and liverwort species in New Zealand that have been comprehensively surveyed. In 2014, it was assessed as having fewer than 250 individuals in the country. The following year, only 36 plants were found in one population near the town of Kaikōura. As such, the species is at a high risk of becoming extinct in New Zealand, and was assessed as Nationally Critical in the New Zealand Threat Classification System in 2014 and 2020 due to the extremely low surviving population in the country.

In recent years, the species has been found on Tasmania in Australia. It is the only Petalophyllum species on the island, and in 2020 the Australian population's status was assessed as Threatened.

The precise causes for the decline of Petalophyllum preissii are unknown, but invasive grasses like Festuca rubra may be forcing it out of some habitats. Petalophyllum preissii is found on moist sandy ground alongside Riccia liverworts.
