= Calypogeia rhynchophylla =

Conservation status
- Vulnerable (IUCN 2.3)

Scientific classification
- Kingdom: Plantae
- Division: Marchantiophyta
- Class: Jungermanniopsida
- Order: Jungermanniales
- Family: Calypogeiaceae
- Genus: Calypogeia
- Species: C. rhynchophylla

Binomial name
- Calypogeia rhynchophylla (Herzog) Bischl.

Species of liverwort

Calypogeia rhynchophylla is a species of liverwort in the family Calypogeiaceae. It is endemic to Costa Rica. Its natural habitat is subtropical or tropical moist lowland forests.
