= Noteroclada confluens =

Scientific classification
- Kingdom: Plantae
- Division: Marchantiophyta
- Class: Jungermanniopsida
- Order: Pelliales
- Family: Noterocladaceae
- Genus: Noteroclada
- Species: N. confluens

Binomial name
- Noteroclada confluens Taylor ex Hook. & Wilson

Synonyms
- Androcryphia confluens (Taylor ex Hook. & Wilson) Nees; Jungermannia confluens (Taylor ex Hook. & Wilson) Hook.f. & Taylor; Androcryphia leucorhiza (Spruce) Steph.; Noteroclada leucorhiza Spruce; Noteroclada arhiza Spruce

Species of liverwort

Noteroclada confluens is a species of liverwort belonging to the family Noterocladaceae. It is characterised by grass-green shoots bearing rounded leaves and distinctive underground tubers that come in two geographical forms. The species is primarily found in Latin America, with two main centres of distribution: along the Andes Mountains from Mexico to Tierra del Fuego, and in the coastal mountains of southeastern Brazil, with additional disjunct populations on several South Atlantic islands. It typically grows in moist montane environments, forming dense mats along stream banks, lake edges and seeps. While its taxonomic history has been complex, particularly regarding confusion with the genus Fossombronia, modern studies recognise it as the sole species in its genus and place it in its own family within the order Pelliales, related to but distinct from Pellia.

== Taxonomy ==
Noteroclada confluens originated as a name created by Thomas Taylor, but was first officially established when William Jackson Hooker and William Wilson published it in the London Journal of Botany (1844), based on specimens collected by George Gardner (n. 32) from the Organ Mountains of Brazil. The original brief description comparing it to Jungermannia hyalina was sufficient to make this scientific name officially valid under botanical naming rules, even though it was very short.

The taxonomic history of the species has been complex and marked by confusion with related genera. The name Androcryphia was proposed by Christian Gottfried Daniel Nees von Esenbeck in 1846 as a replacement for Noteroclada, believing Taylor's choice of name to be etymologically nonsensical. However, Nees misinterpreted the prefix "noter-" as deriving from the Greek notos (meaning "back") rather than noteros (meaning "moist"), the latter being a logical reference to the plant's wet habitat preferences. This created a prolonged period of nomenclatural uncertainty, with some authors using Noteroclada while others preferred Androcryphia, and many using both names. The situation was first addressed in 1950 when Johannes Max Proskauer demonstrated that since Androcryphia's type species (A. porphyrorhiza) was actually based on a Fossombronia specimen, Androcryphia automatically became a synonym of Fossombronia, definitively establishing Noteroclada as the correct name for the genus. This conclusion was further reinforced by Proskauer's 1955 detailed examination of the holotype specimen in Nees's herbarium, which revealed it contained only Fossombronia specimens with purple rhizoids.

Early taxonomic confusion also stemmed from mixed collections containing both Noteroclada and Fossombronia specimens. This was particularly evident in the case of Jungermannia porphyrorhiza Nees (1833), whose type specimen contained both genera. This mixing of specimens led to inconsistent descriptions and taxonomic uncertainty that persisted for many years.

The species has undergone several taxonomic reassignments, being variously placed in Jungermannia, Pellia, and Androcryphia. Modern molecular and morphological studies support its placement in the order Pelliales, but in its own family Noterocladaceae, separate from the related genus Pellia. The family Noterocladaceae was validly published by Frey and Stech in 2005, recognising the significant ontogenetic differences between Noteroclada and Pellia despite their shared morphological features.

Despite historical suggestions of multiple species within the genus, comprehensive studies incorporating morphological, experimental, and molecular evidence support the recognition of N. confluens as the sole species, showing natural variation across its broad geographic range.

== Description ==
Noteroclada confluens is a leafy liverwort characterised by distinctive morphological features that reflect its adaptation to moist environments. The plant forms shoots that are bright grass-green when fresh, turning light to dark brown when dried. The shoots vary in width from 3.0 to 6.4 mm, with smaller forms typically found in the Atlantic rainforests of Brazil and larger forms in Andean populations. The underside of the shoots is covered with threadlike structures called rhizoids, which are clear (hyaline) to pale yellow in colour – notably never purple, which helps distinguish this species from the similar-looking genus Fossombronia.

The leaves are rounded to oval-shaped (suborbicular to elliptical), measuring 1.1–3.0 mm wide by 1.5–3.8 mm long. Young leaves near the shoot tip are inserted at an oblique angle, while mature leaves become almost parallel to the stem. Each leaf cell contains up to 20 small, shining oil bodies about the same size as the chloroplasts. Branching is sparse and occurs in a single direction from the main stem (monopodial), unlike the forked branching seen in related genera.

The species is monoicous, meaning both male and female reproductive structures occur on the same plant. The male structures (antheridia) are pale yellow, globe-shaped, and develop in specialised chambers on the upper surface of the stem. The female structures (archegonia) develop naked on the stem surface, rather than being protected by specialised leaves or other structures.

After fertilisation, the spore-producing structure (sporophyte) develops within a protective cover formed by stem tissue. The spherical spore capsule contains both spores and specialised cells called elaters, which help disperse the spores. The spores are spherical and densely covered with small projections, measuring 45–50 micrometres in diameter.

One of the most distinctive characteristics of N. confluens is its ability to produce underground storage structures called tubers, which help the plant survive unfavourable conditions. These tubers come in two forms: ellipsoidal tubers, typically found in Atlantic rainforest populations, and spheroidal tubers, characteristic of Andean populations. Both types are packed with starch and have hardened outer surfaces.

The plant can also produce small, specialized branches called cladia, which can detach from the main plant and grow into new individuals. These regenerative branches are 2–3 mm long and occur in about 6% of specimens, serving as a means of vegetative reproduction.

== Habitat, distribution, and ecology ==
Noteroclada confluens has a primarily Latin American distribution with two main centres of diversity. The first extends along the Andes Mountains from central Mexico through Costa Rica and south to Tierra del Fuego, while the second occurs in the lower elevation coastal mountains of southeastern Brazil. The species also shows notable disjunct populations in several South Atlantic islands, including the Falkland Islands, South Georgia, Tristan da Cunha, and Gough Island.

Historical reports of the species from South Africa, Kerguelen Island, and New Zealand have been disproven through modern research, with specimens from these locations being correctly identified as members of other genera, particularly Fossombronia.

The species typically grows in consistently moist montane environments, forming extensive, dense mats over soil along stream banks, at the edges of lakes or bogs, and near seeps. While it requires constant moisture, it notably never grows fully submerged in water. The elevation range varies significantly across its distribution: in Mexico, Costa Rica, and the northern to central Andes, it occurs at elevations above 2,000 metres, while in other parts of its range it can be found at much lower elevations.

As a perennial species, N. confluens can persist in suitable habitats for extended periods, undergoing repeated cycles of reproductive development. The species employs multiple reproductive strategies, including both sexual reproduction through spores and vegetative reproduction through specialised structures. The development of two distinct types of underground tubers – spheroidal in Andean populations and ellipsoidal in Atlantic rainforest populations – represents an adaptation for surviving periodic environmental stress.

The species' presence in remote South Atlantic islands such as Tristan da Cunha and Gough Island suggests long-distance dispersal capabilities, possibly facilitated by migratory seabirds, particularly shearwaters and albatrosses that are known to travel between Tierra del Fuego, the Falkland Islands, and these mid-Atlantic islands. While the spores are relatively large and thin-walled, making wind dispersal over great distances unlikely, they may be transported by birds or other vectors.

The plant's relationship with fungi is also notable, as it forms associations with glomeromycotean fungi, similar to its relative Pellia, suggesting an important ecological role in nutrient cycling within its habitats.

A study in tropical Ecuador found that Noteroclada confluens was typically not found in urban environments despite being found in a nearby pristine location, suggesting that the species is sensitive to anthropogenic effects such as the presence of wastewater and heavy metal pollution.
