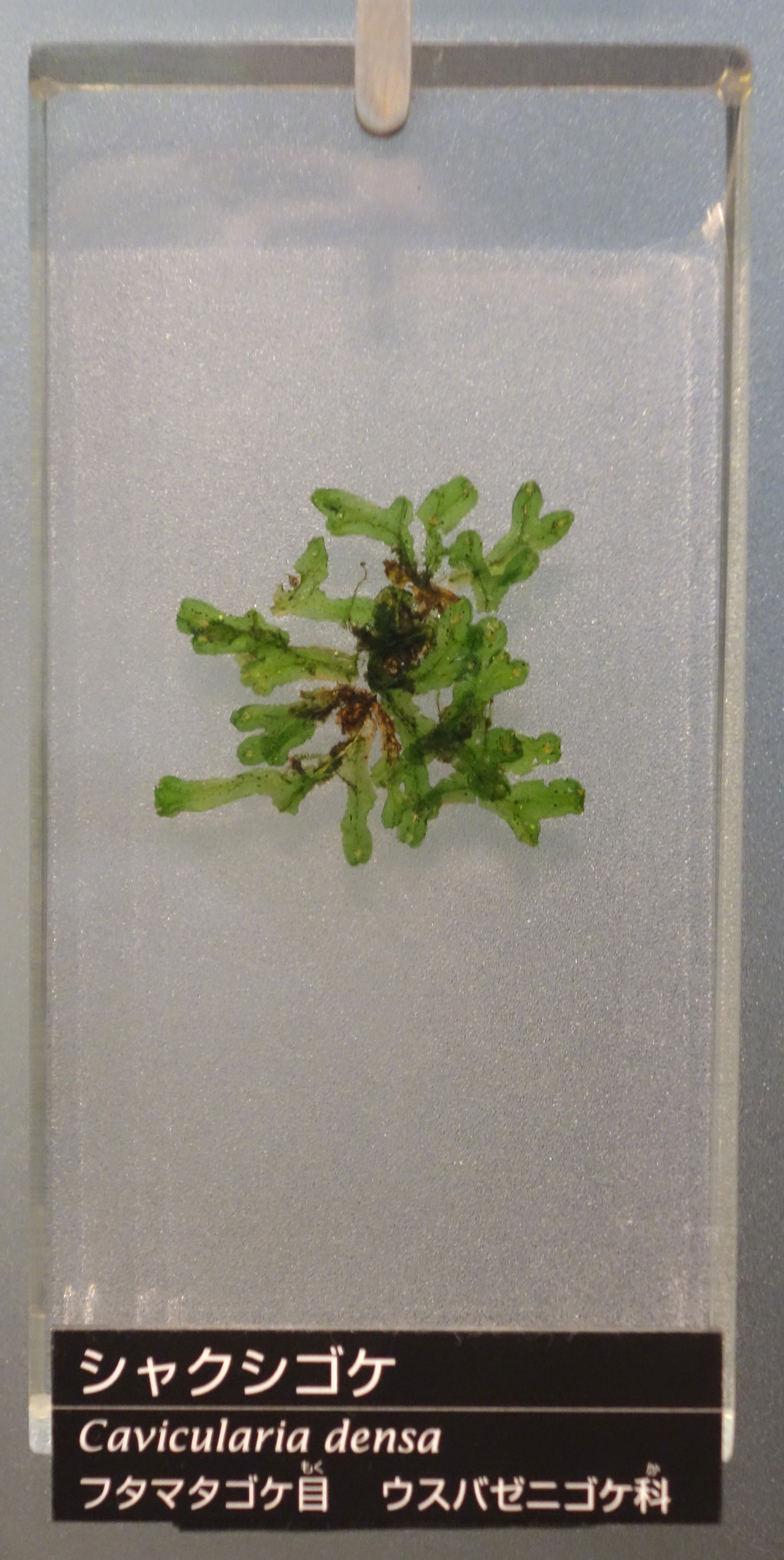

Scientific classification
- Kingdom: Plantae
- Division: Marchantiophyta
- Class: Marchantiopsida
- Order: Blasiales
- Family: Blasiaceae
- Genus: Cavicularia; Steph. 1897
- Species: C. densa

Binomial name
- Cavicularia densa Steph. 1897

= Cavicularia =

Genus of liverworts

Cavicularia densa is the only species in the liverwort genus Cavicularia. The species was first described in 1897 by Franz Stephani, and is endemic to Japan, where it grows on fine moist soil.

Plants are thalloid and flattened, with distinct upper and lower surfaces and a faint central strand. Thin scales grow from the underside in two rows, and in the region between the scales and the central strand are small ear-shaped domatia which harbor colonies of the blue-green alga Nostoc. The plants are dioicous, with the male antheridia and female archegonia produced by separate plants. Plants may also reproduce asexually from multicellular gemmae produced in crescent-shaped receptacles on the thallus surface.

The spores are spherical and apolar, with a surface devoid of ornamentation except for tiny papillae. Gametophyte development is endosporic, so that cell divisions begin inside the spore wall. This pattern of development is normally found in liverworts from xeric environments, rather than those growing in moist habitats like Cavicularia. Once the young gametophyte germinates and ruptures the spore coat, it produces a multi-layered mass from which the adult plant will develop.

Cavicularia is classified in the family Blasiaceae along with the genus Blasia, from which it is distinguished by the absence of a collar around the base of the sporophyte capsule, and a clustered arrangement of sperm-producing antheridia. Like Blasia, plants of Cavicularia possess domatia containing colonies of the blue-green alga Nostoc. Despite their similarities and traditional classification together, the two genera do not group together as a clade in some recent analyses. While Blasia attaches to the base of the complex-thalloid clade Marchantiopsida, Cavicularia lies at the base of the simple-thalloid and leafy clade Jungermanniopsida. Thus, the genus has been dubbed "problematic", but modifications to its taxonomic placement await further investigation.

The chemical compound cavicularin was isolated from this species. Cavicularin is notable for being the first compound isolated from nature displaying optical activity solely due to the presence of planar chirality and axial chirality.
