= Plagiochasma =

Plagiochasma may refer to:

- Plagiochasma (echinoderm), an extinct echinoderm genus in the family Pygaulidae
- Plagiochasma (plant), a plant genus in the family Aytoniaceae
