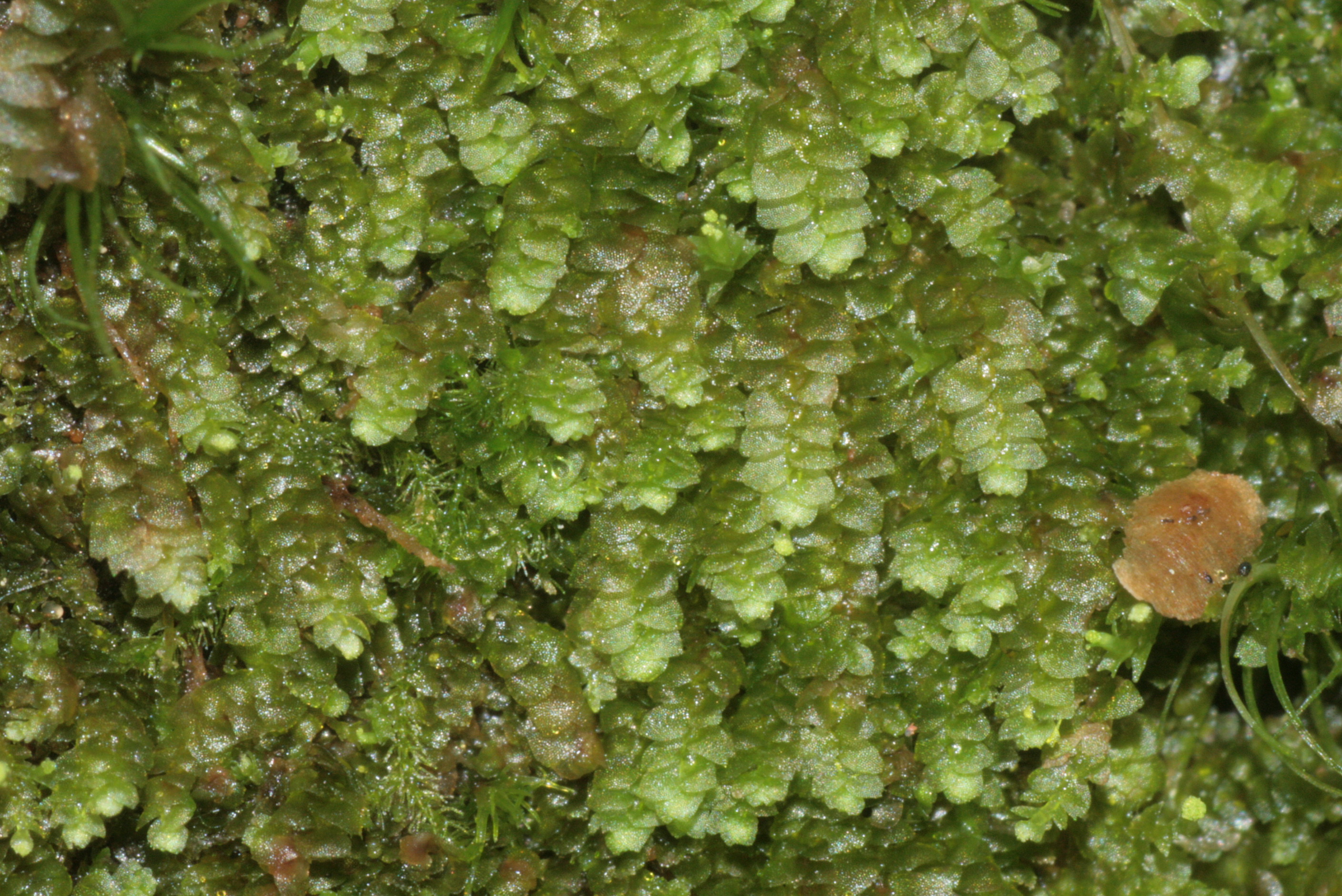

Scientific classification
- Kingdom: Plantae
- Division: Marchantiophyta
- Class: Jungermanniopsida
- Order: Jungermanniales
- Family: Calypogeiaceae
- Genus: Calypogeia
- Species: C. suecica

Binomial name
- Calypogeia suecica (Arnell & J. Perss.) K. Müller

= Calypogeia suecica =

Species of liverwort

Calypogeia suecica is a species of liverwort belonging to the family Calypogeiaceae.

It is native to Europe and Northern America.
