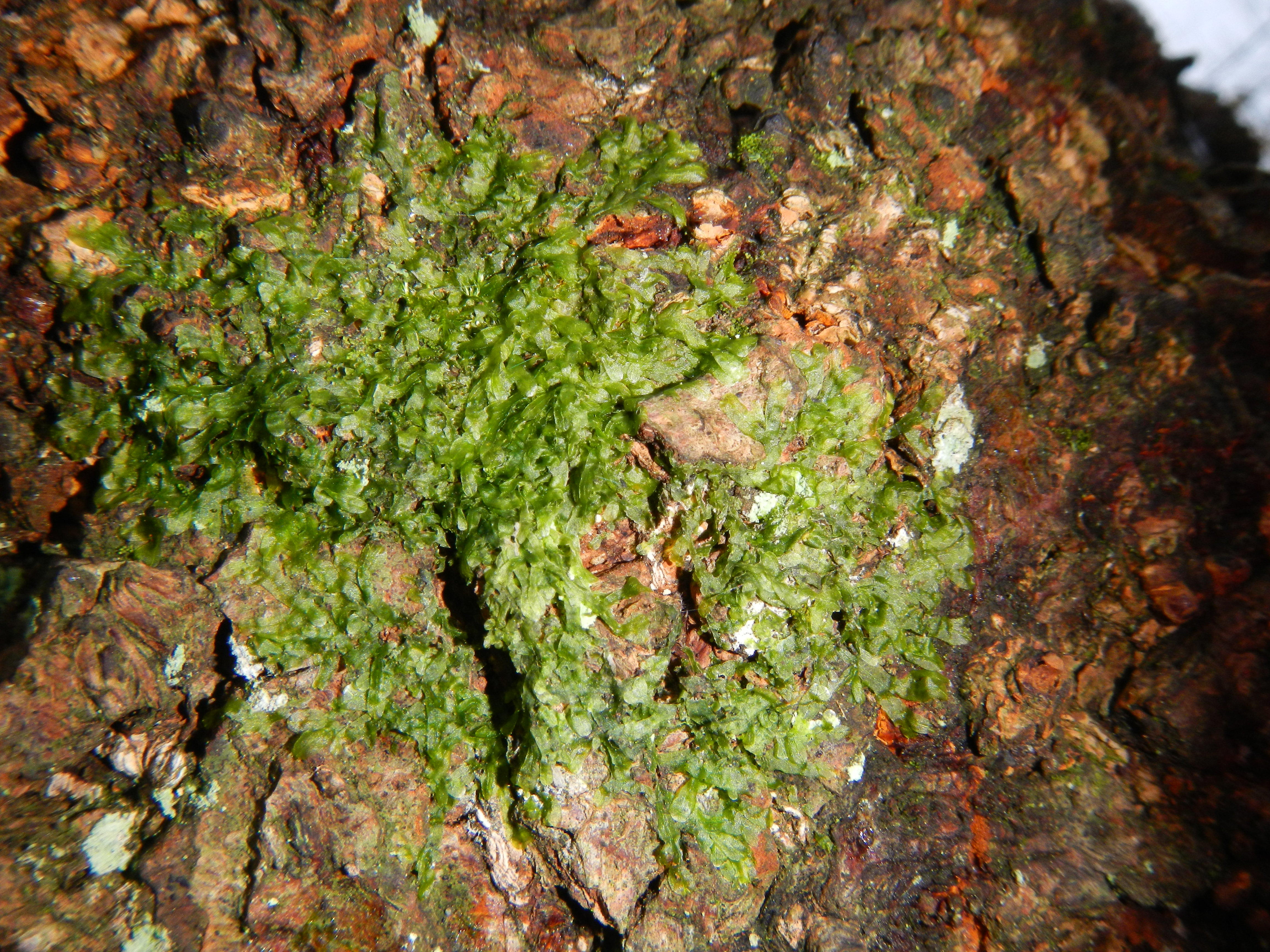

Scientific classification
- Kingdom: Plantae
- Division: Marchantiophyta
- Class: Jungermanniopsida
- Order: Metzgeriales
- Family: Metzgeriaceae
- Genus: Metzgeria
- Species: M. furcata

Binomial name
- Metzgeria furcata (L.) Corda

= Metzgeria furcata =

Species of liverwort

Metzgeria furcata, the forked veilwort, is a frequent liverwort growing on the bark of a wide range of tree and shrub species and occasionally on rocks. It is a slim, translucent thallose liverwort that forms yellow-green mats of branches about 1mm wide.

== Description ==
Metzgeria furcata has a midrib which is clearly visible over the rest of the thallus (which is 1mm wide), and extends to the tip of the thallus, although without an excurrent nerve. The defining characteristic is definitely the fact that the thalli and the midrib fork at the end, which is visible on most patches. The Forked Veilwort rarely makes sporophytes, although on the underside of quite a few patches an inflorescence can be found.

== British distribution ==
Found over the whole of the British Isles, but less widely in Ireland and some parts of the Scottish Highlands. Found on Scilly, Shetland, Orkney and the Isle of Man.

== Similar species in Britain ==
Apometzgeria pubescens is very hairy and Metzgeria fruticulosa and M. temperata constantly have gemmae on the thalli. M. conjugata grows on rock, and M. furcata can sometimes grow on rock too, but M. conjugata has thalli that are twice as wide as M. furcata and the margins are much more turned down.
