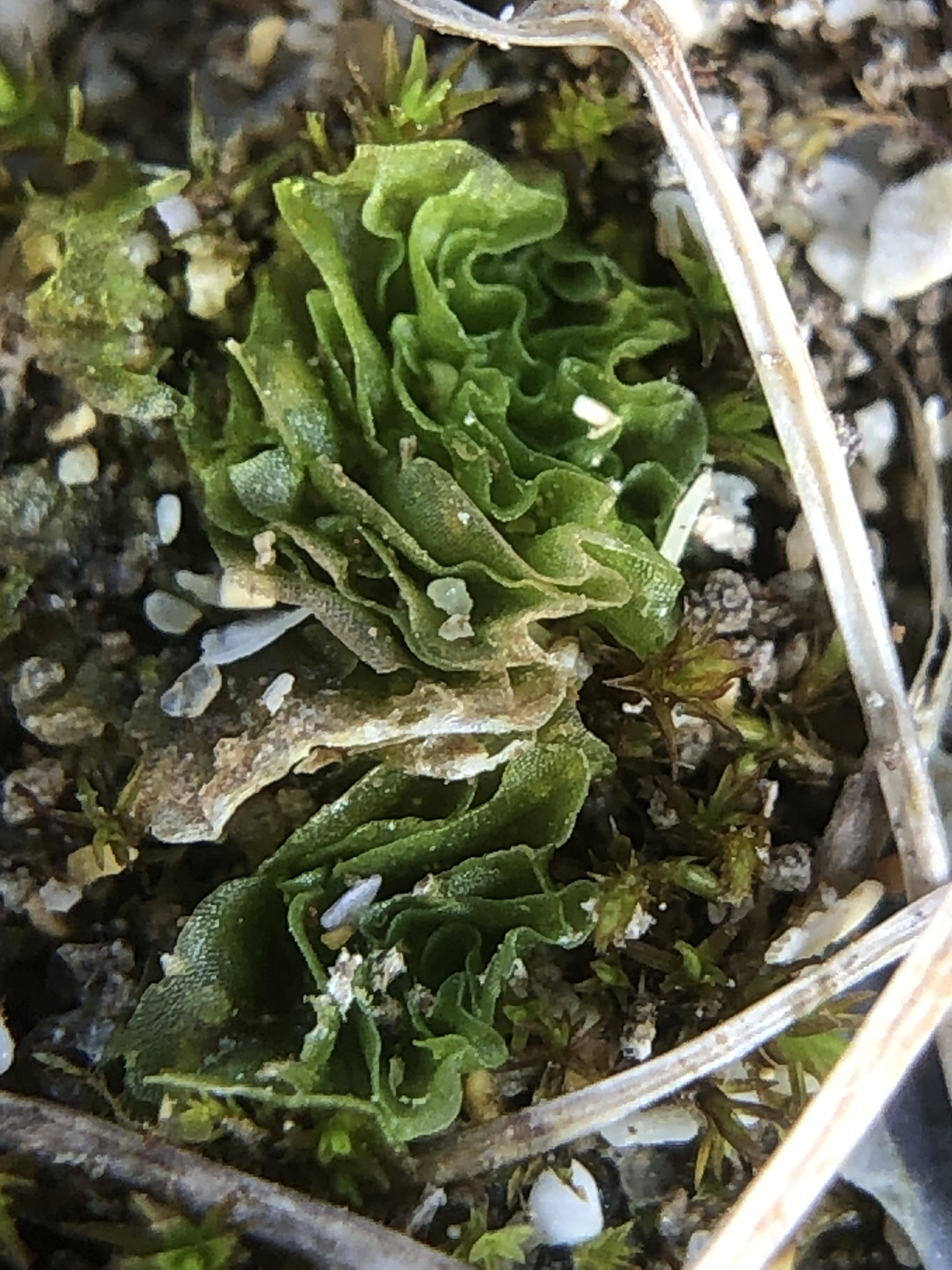

Scientific classification
- Kingdom: Plantae
- Division: Marchantiophyta
- Class: Jungermanniopsida
- Order: Fossombroniales
- Family: Petalophyllaceae
- Genus: Petalophyllum
- Species: P. ralfsii

Binomial name
- Petalophyllum ralfsii (Wilson) Nees & Gottsche ex Lehmann, 1844

= Petalophyllum ralfsii =

Species of liverwort

Petalophyllum ralfsii, commonly known as petalwort, is a species of liverwort in the order Fossombroniales. It is a small green bryophyte that occurs in the Mediterranean region as far east as Turkey, and along the Atlantic coast of Europe as far as north-western Scotland. It grows primarily on moist sand dunes.

== Description ==
The plants are small, typically less than 15 mm long by 10 mm wide (0.6 in by 0.4 in), and thallose; that is, the plant is not differentiated into root, stem, and leaf. The thallus consists of a midrib flanked by two wings that bear erect, leaf-like lamellae on their dorsal surface.

== Distribution and habitat ==
Petalophyllum ralfsii has a widespread distribution across Europe, primarily in the Mediterranean region. It has a specific habitat requirement, being restricted to dune slacks with certain features; it needs open, damp conditions, often growing on low hummocks rather than on the wettest parts of the slack. In Britain, the largest population occurs at Achnahaird in Scotland, the most northerly point in its range. Other locations include Braunton Burrows and Dawlish Warren in Devon; Kenfig, Aberffraw and the Carmarthen Bay dunes in Wales; Lindisfarne off the coast of Northumberland; the Isles of Scilly and the Sefton Coast in Merseyside. These dunes are increasingly under threat, leading to the species being classified as "vulnerable", and the British Isles may now be the liverwort's stronghold.

It sometimes grows beside paths, where trampling feet keep down competing vegetation. Plants with which this liverwort may be associated include various mosses, grasses such as the common bent (Agrostis capillaris), red fescue (Festuca rubra) and Yorkshire-fog (Holcus lanatus), the grey sedge (Carex flacca) and the buck’s-horn plantain (Plantago coronopus).
