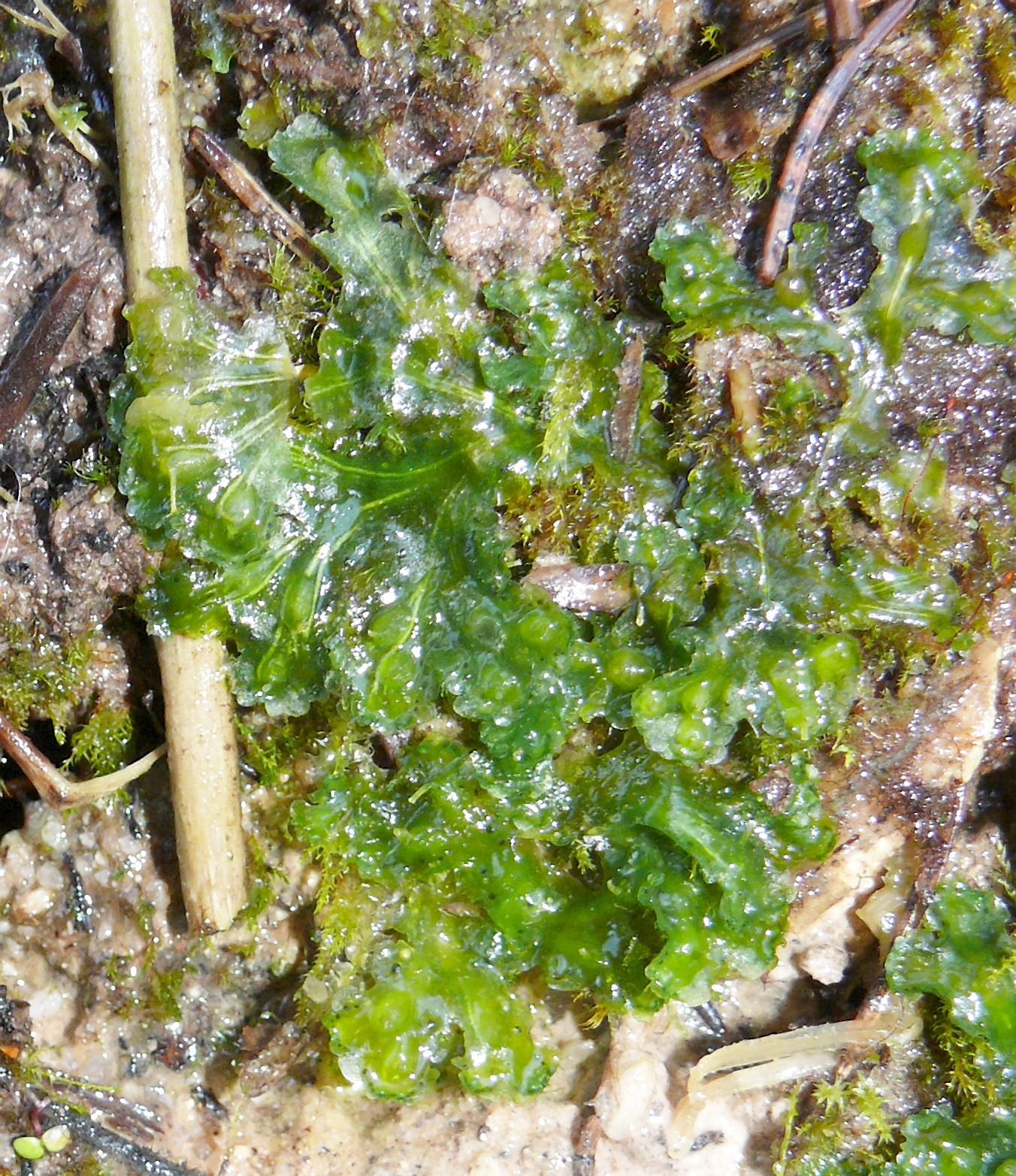
- Blasia pusilla

Scientific classification
- Kingdom: Plantae
- Division: Marchantiophyta
- Class: Marchantiopsida
- Order: Blasiales
- Family: Blasiaceae; H.Klinggr., 1858

Genera
- Blasia; Cavicularia

= Blasiaceae =

Family of liverworts

Blasiaceae is a family of liverworts with only two species: Blasia pusilla (a circumboreal species) and Cavicularia densa (found only in Japan). The family has traditionally been classified among the Metzgeriales, but molecular cladistics suggests a placement at the base of the Marchantiopsida.
