= Vandiemenia =

Conservation status
- Critically Endangered (IUCN 2.3)

Scientific classification
- Kingdom: Plantae
- Clade: Embryophytes
- Division: Marchantiophyta
- Class: Jungermanniopsida
- Order: Metzgeriales
- Family: Metzgeriaceae
- Genus: Vandiemenia; Hewson
- Species: V. ratkowskiana

Binomial name
- Vandiemenia ratkowskiana Hewson, 1982

Genus of liverworts

Vandiemenia ratkowskiana is the only species of liverwort in the genus Vandiemenia. It is endemic to Tasmania, Australia. Its natural habitat is temperate wet forests. The species is only known to occur on rotten logs in wet sclerophyll forest dominated by Eucalyptus delegatensis at mid-altitudes on Kunanyi/Mt Wellington.
