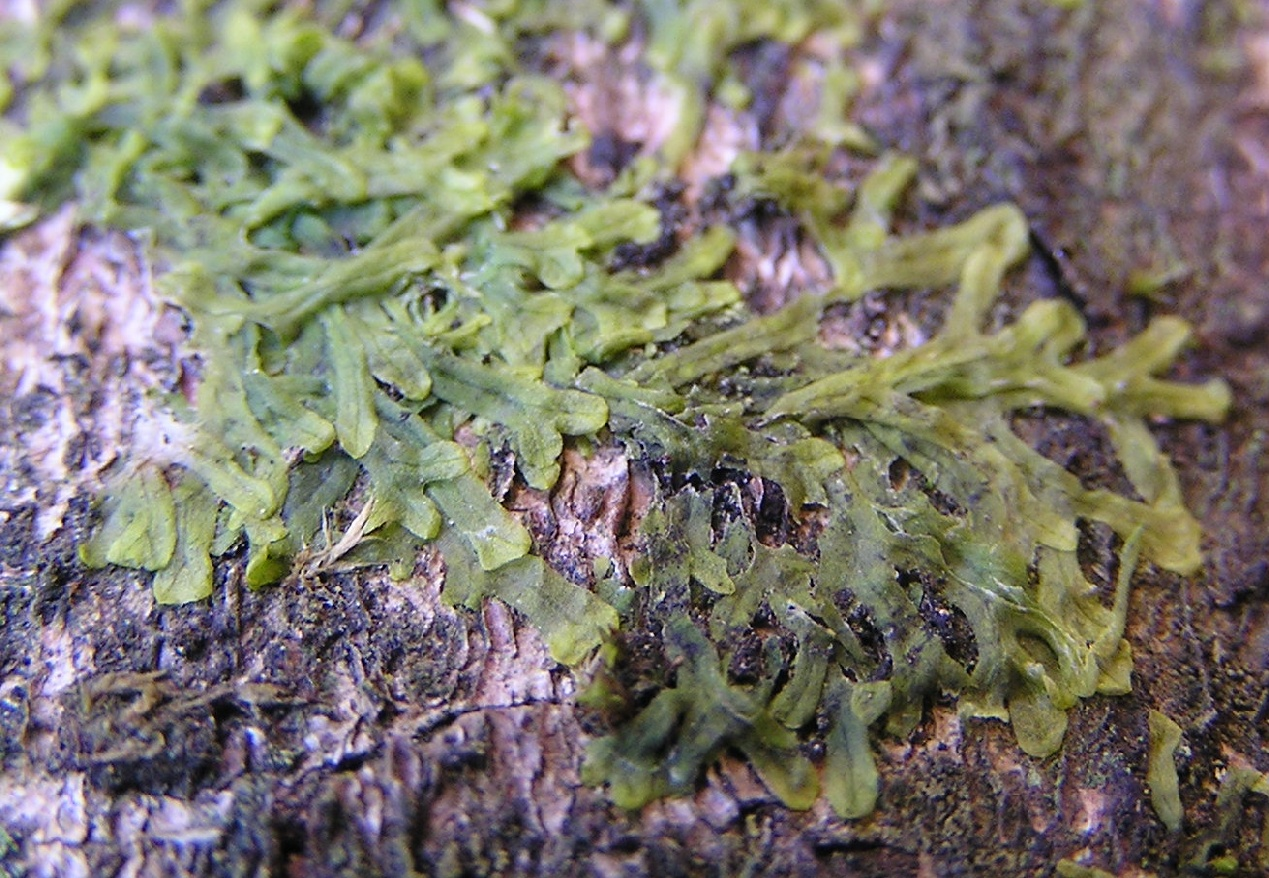
- Metzgeria furcata growing on bark in Germany

Scientific classification
- Kingdom: Plantae
- Division: Marchantiophyta
- Class: Jungermanniopsida
- Order: Metzgeriales
- Family: Metzgeriaceae; Klinggr., 1858

Genera
- See text

Synonyms
- Vandiemeniaceae

= Metzgeriaceae =

Family of liverworts

Metzgeriaceae is a family of thallose liverworts in the order Metzgeriales. Species may be either monoicous or dioicous.

== Genera ==
As accepted by GBIF;

- Apometzgeria Kuwah.
- Metzgeria Raddi (212)
- Steerella Kuwah. (2)
- Vandiemenia Hewson

Figures in brackets are approx. how many species per genus.
