= Treubiites =

Treubiites Temporal range: Late Carboniferous

Scientific classification
- Kingdom: Plantae
- Division: Marchantiophyta
- Class: Marchantiopsida
- Order: Blasiales
- Family: †Treubiitaceae; R.M.Schust.
- Genus: †Treubiites; R.M.Schust. 1966
- Species: †T. kidstonii

Binomial name
- †Treubiites kidstonii (Walton 1925) R.M.Schust. 1966

Synonyms
- Hepaticites kidstonii Walton 1925

Extinct genus of liverworts

Treubiites kidstonii is a fossil species of liverworts in the family Treubiitaceae. The only known fossils come from Late Carboniferous deposits of Shropshire, England.
