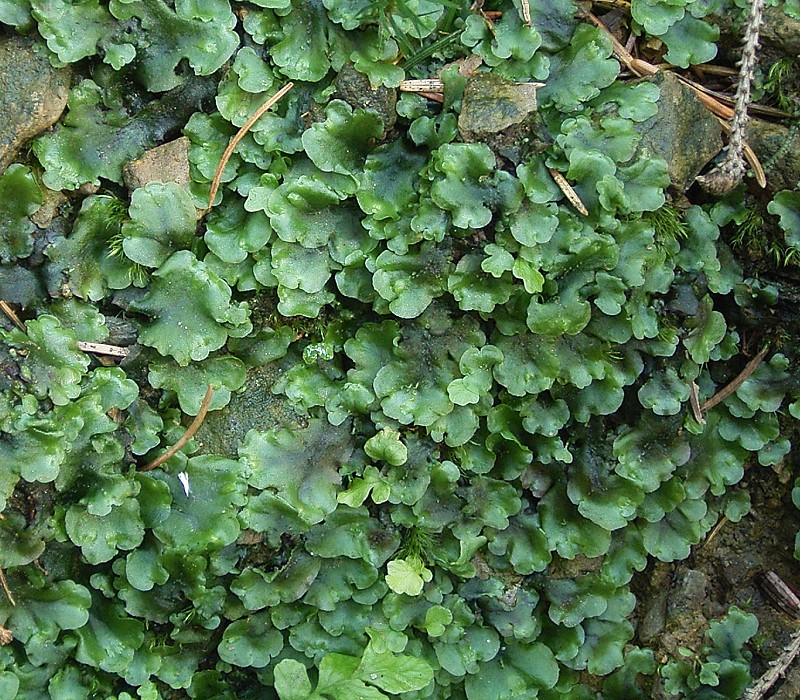
- Pellia epiphylla growing on moist soil

Scientific classification
- Kingdom: Plantae
- Division: Marchantiophyta
- Class: Jungermanniopsida
- Order: Pelliales
- Family: Pelliaceae; Klinggr., 1858

Genera
- Androcryphia; Noteroclada; Pellia

= Pelliaceae =

Family of liverworts

Pelliaceae is a family of liverworts which has included three genera: Pellia (in the temperate Northern Hemisphere) and Noteroclada (in the Southern Hemisphere), and Androcryphia. The three genera are easily distinguished, not only because they occur in completely separate regions of the world, but because Noteroclada has a leafy appearance, while Pellia is more clearly thallose. Androcryphia is much less common, and bears similarities to the foliose members of Jungermanniales. Noteroclada is now placed in the family Noterocladaceae.

Media related to Pelliaceae at Wikimedia Commons
