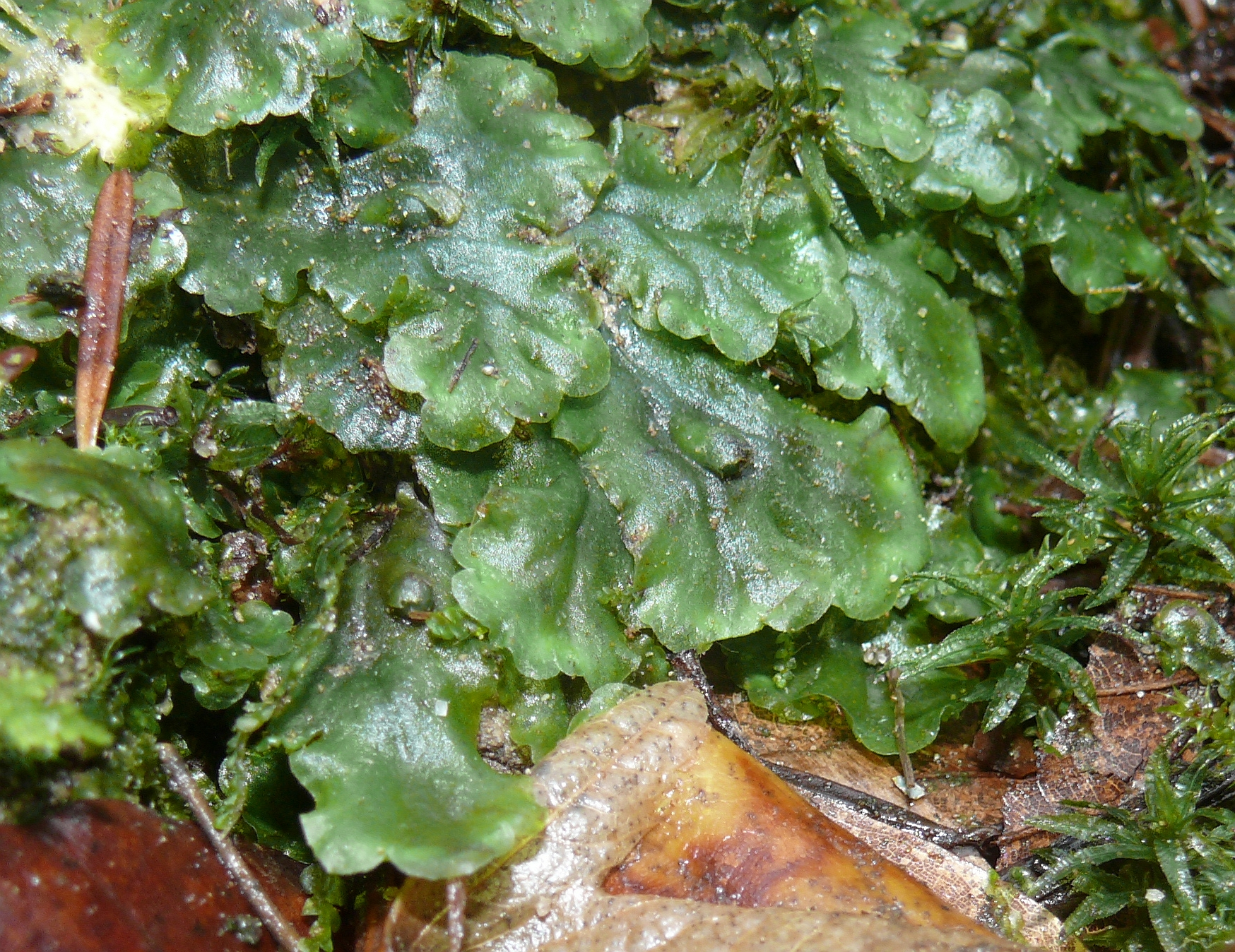

Scientific classification
- Kingdom: Plantae
- Division: Marchantiophyta
- Class: Jungermanniopsida
- Order: Pelliales
- Family: Pelliaceae
- Genus: Pellia
- Species: P. epiphylla

Binomial name
- Pellia epiphylla (L.) Corda

= Pellia epiphylla =

Species of liverworts in the family Pelliaceae

Pellia epiphylla (sometimes known as overleaf pellia or common pellia) is a species of thallose liverwort. It occurs in North America, Europe, North Africa and parts of Asia. It grows in patches in damp, sheltered places on neutral or acidic substrates. It is common on the banks of rivers, streams and ditches and also grows in wet woodland, marshes and on wet rocks.

== Description ==
The thalli are irregularly branched and are fairly large, growing to over 1 cm wide and several centimetres long. They are green, sometimes with a red or purple tinge. They are fairly featureless with an ill-defined midrib and no visible network of cells on the surface. There are many long rhizoids on the underside of the thallus but no ventral scales.

Pellia epiphylla is monoicous, with both male and female sex organs on the same thallus. The small male organs are scattered along the midrib while the female organs grow near the tip of the thallus and are surrounded by a flap. The plant produces spherical, greenish-black capsules which are borne on stalks known as setae. These are pale green and up to 5 cm long.

== Reproduction ==
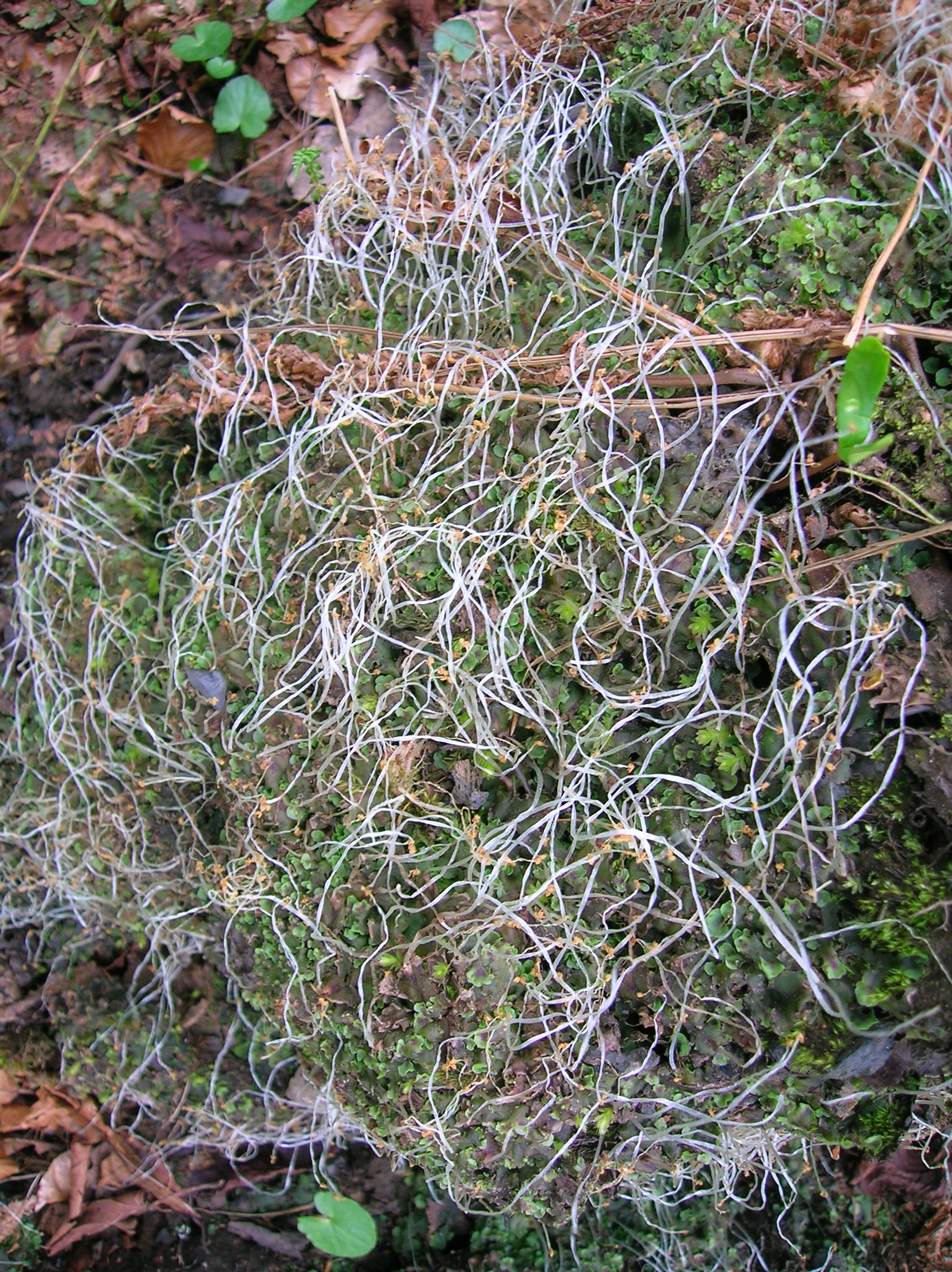
Sporophytes on the thalli.

Fertilisation takes place when the thallus is wet. The male sex organs (antheridia) absorb moisture and burst, releasing sperm. The sperm swim towards the female sex organs (archegonia) and fertilise the ova. The fertilised ovum develops into a small sporophyte plant which remains attached to the larger gametophyte plant. The sporophyte contains spores inside a capsule which are released when the capsule becomes mature and splits. The spores germinate to produce new gametophytes.

== Gallery ==
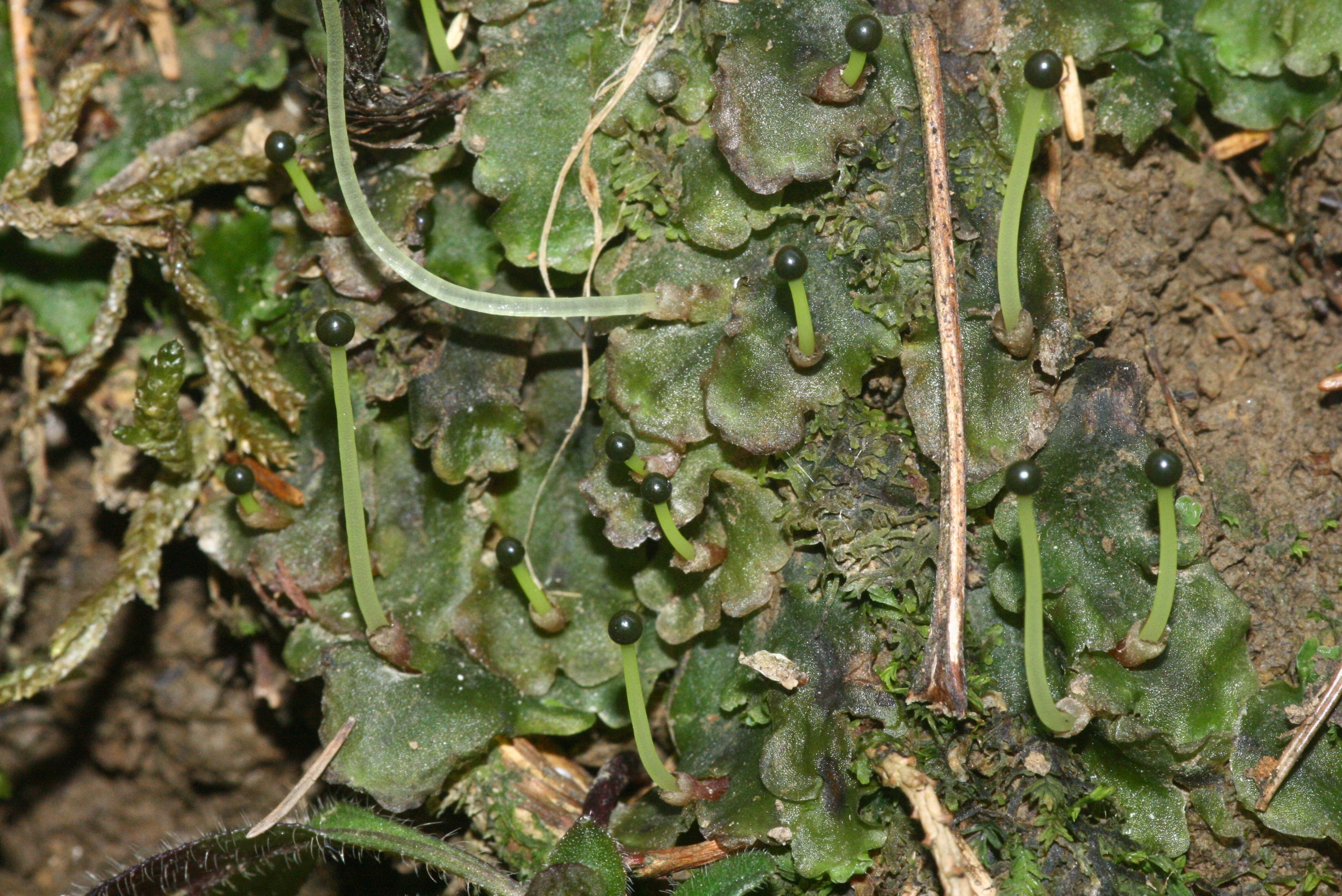

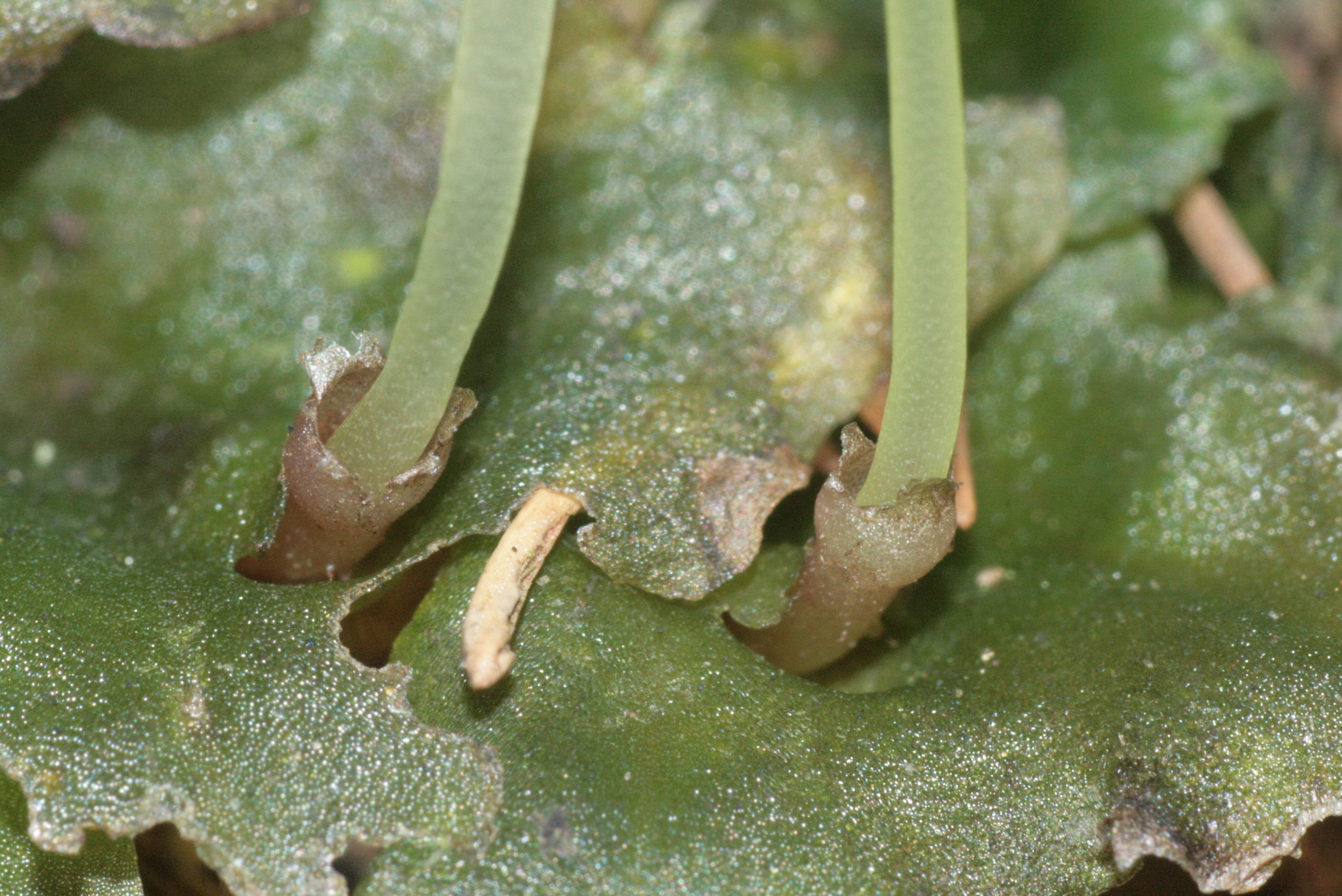

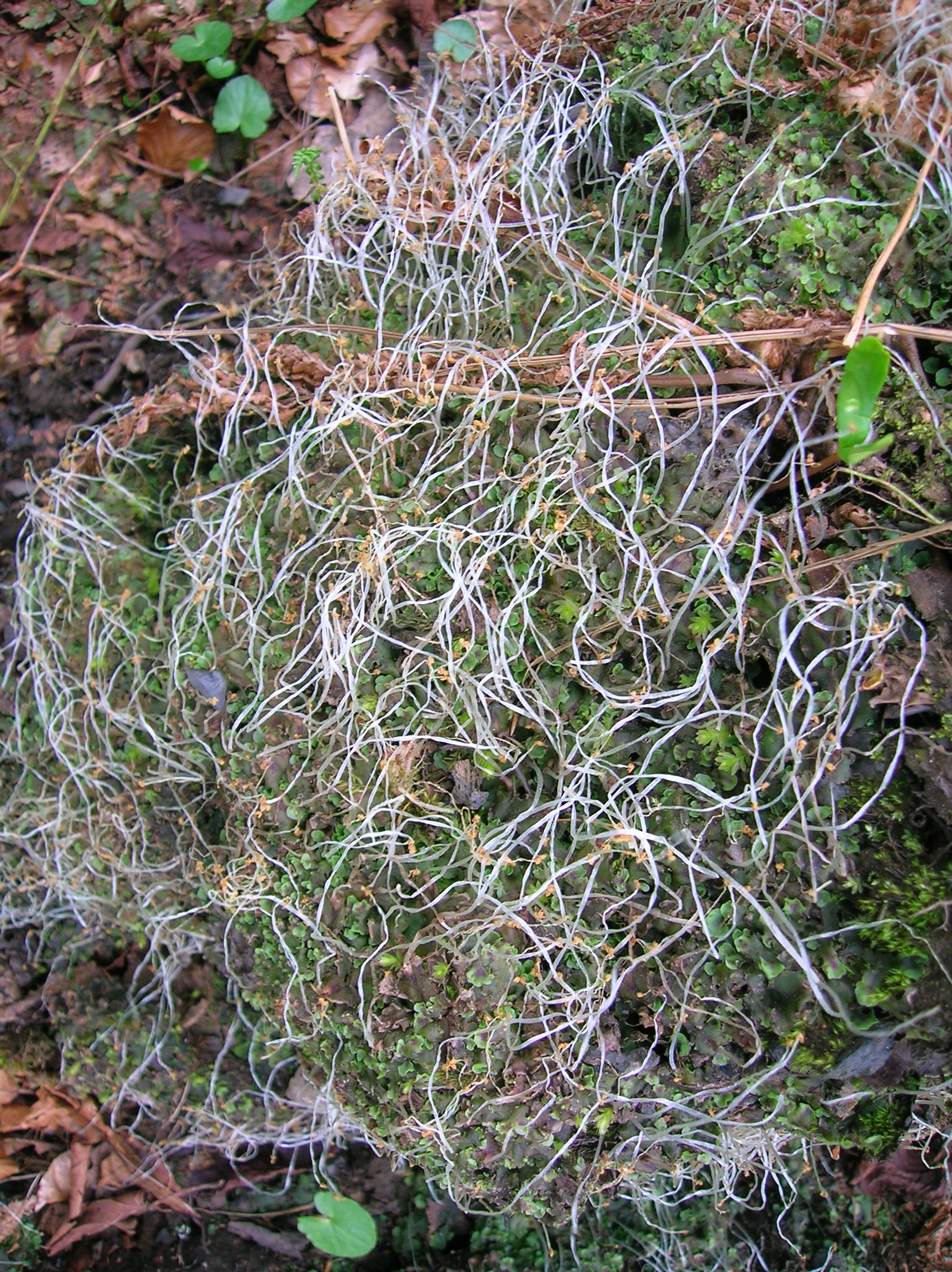

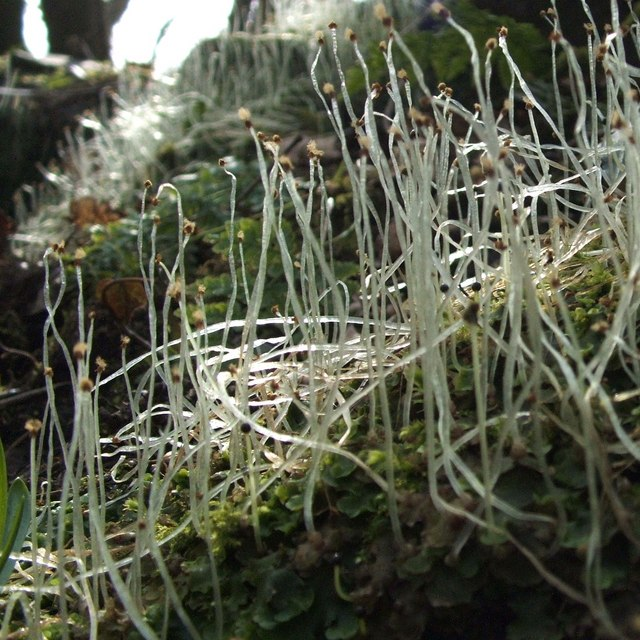
