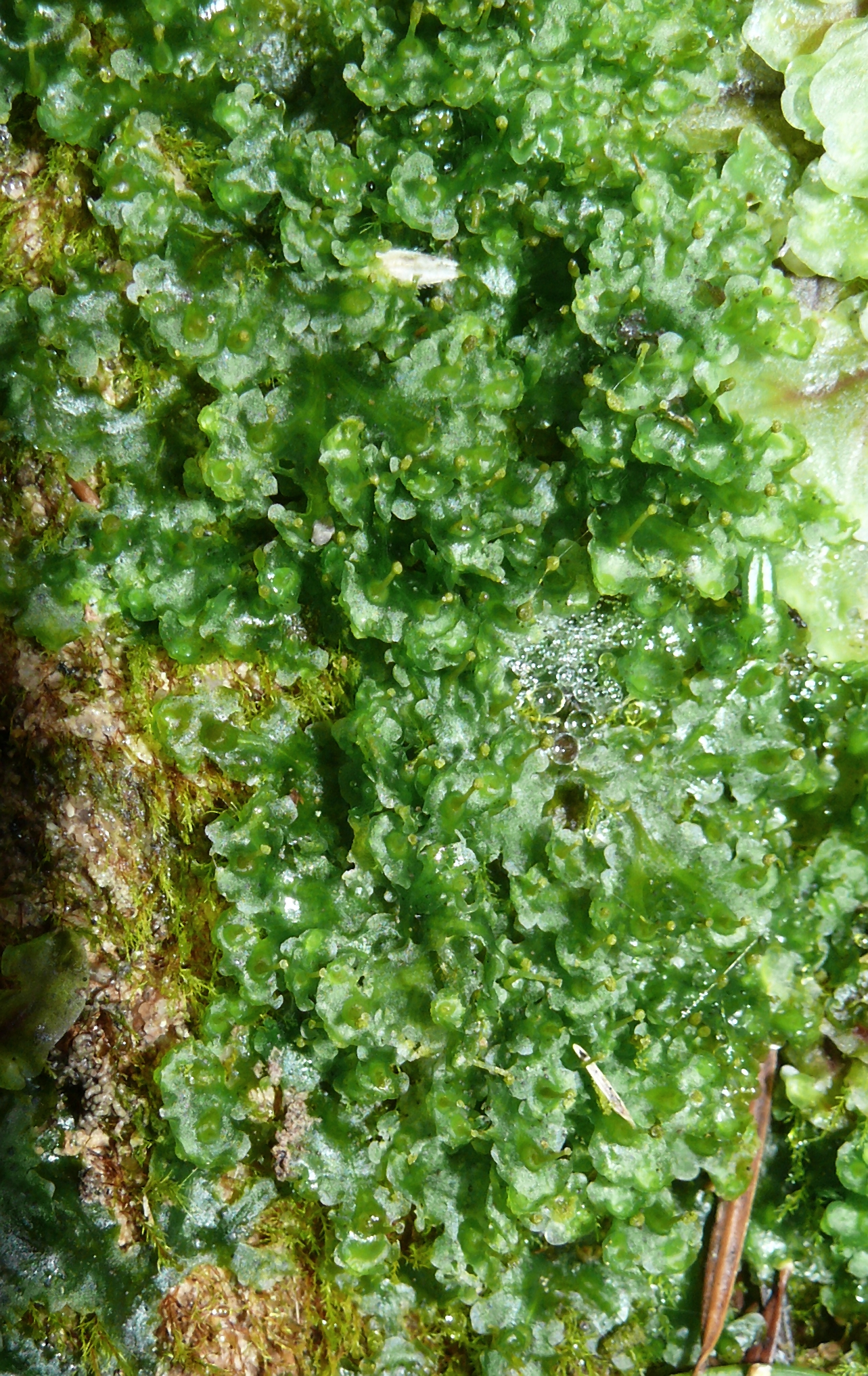
- Blasia pusilla growing on a tree in Germany.

Scientific classification
- Kingdom: Plantae
- Division: Marchantiophyta
- Class: Marchantiopsida
- Order: Blasiales
- Family: Blasiaceae
- Genus: Blasia; L. 1753
- Species: B. pusilla

Binomial name
- Blasia pusilla L. 1753

Synonyms
- Biagia Trevisan 1877; Biagia pusilla (Linnaeus 1753) Trevisan 1877; Blasia funckii Corda 1832; Blasia germanica Corda 1832; Blasia hookeri Corda 1832; Blasia immersa Dumortier 1831; Blasia semilibera Dumortier 1831; Jungermannia biloba Swartz 1803; Jungermannia blasia Hooker 1816

= Blasia =

Genus of liverworts

Blasia pusilla is the only species in the liverwort genus Blasia. This species establishes a symbiosis with nitrogen-fixing cyanobacteria of the genus Nostoc, which are housed in special cavities, called auricles, occurring on the ventral (underside) surface of the thallus.

Blasia is distinguished from Cavicularia by the presence of a collar around the base of the sporophyte capsule, and a scattered arrangement of sperm-producing antheridia. Rhizoids and gemmae of Blasia may be parasitized by the mushroom Blasiphalia.

The genus name of Blasia is in honour of Blasius Biagi (ca. 1670 - 1735), an Italian clergyman from village of Vallombrosa.
