= Metzgeriites =

Metzgeriites Temporal range: Jurassic–Cretaceous

Scientific classification
- Kingdom: Plantae
- Division: Marchantiophyta
- Class: Jungermanniopsida
- Order: Metzgeriales
- Genus: †Metzgeriites; Steere [1947]

Extinct genus of liverworts

Metzgeriites is a genus of fossil liverwort.
