= Plagiochasma intermedium =

Scientific classification
- Kingdom: Plantae
- Division: Marchantiophyta
- Class: Marchantiopsida
- Order: Marchantiales
- Family: Aytoniaceae
- Genus: Plagiochasma
- Species: P. intermedium

Binomial name
- Plagiochasma intermedium Lindenb. & Gottsche

Species of liverwort

Plagiochasma intermedium is a liverwort species in the genus Plagiochasma found in China.

Riccardin C, a macrocyclic bis(bibenzyl), can be found in P. intermedium.
