= Cavicularin =

Names
- IUPAC name 9,10,18,19-Tetrahydro-5,8:15,17-diethenobenzo[g]naphth[1,8-bc]oxacyclotetradecin-3,12,21-triol

Identifiers
CAS Number	178734-41-3
3D model (JSmol)	Interactive image
ChemSpider	9491133
PubChem CID	11316166
UNII	B6Y87G6TOX
CompTox Dashboard (EPA)	DTXSID70745431
- InChI: InChI=1S/C28H22O4/c29-20-8-11-22-18(13-20)4-1-16-2-9-21(10-3-16)32-28-25(30)12-7-17-5-6-19-14-26(31)24(22)15-23(19)27(17)28/h2-3,7-15,29-31H,1,4-6H2 Key: MCFLLKAHGNIXPF-UHFFFAOYSA-N; InChI=1/C28H22O4/c29-20-8-11-22-18(13-20)4-1-16-2-9-21(10-3-16)32-28-25(30)12-7-17-5-6-19-14-26(31)24(22)15-23(19)27(17)28/h2-3,7-15,29-31H,1,4-6H2 Key: MCFLLKAHGNIXPF-UHFFFAOYAB
- SMILES: c1cc2ccc1CCc3cc(ccc3-c4cc-5c(cc4O)CCc6c5c(c(cc6)O)O2)O

Properties
Chemical formula	C_{28}H_{22}O_{4}
Molar mass	422.480 g·mol^{−1}
- Except where otherwise noted, data are given for materials in their standard state (at 25 °C [77 °F], 100 kPa). verify (what is ?) Infobox references

Cavicularin is a natural phenolic secondary metabolite isolated from the liverwort Cavicularia densa. This macrocycle is unusual because it was the first compound isolated from nature displaying optical activity solely due to the presence of planar chirality and axial chirality. The specific rotation for (+)-cavicularin is +168.2°. It is also a very strained molecule. The para-substituted phenol ring is bent about 15° out of planarity, adopting a somewhat boat-like geometry. This type of angle strain in aromatic compounds is normally reserved for synthetic cyclophanes.

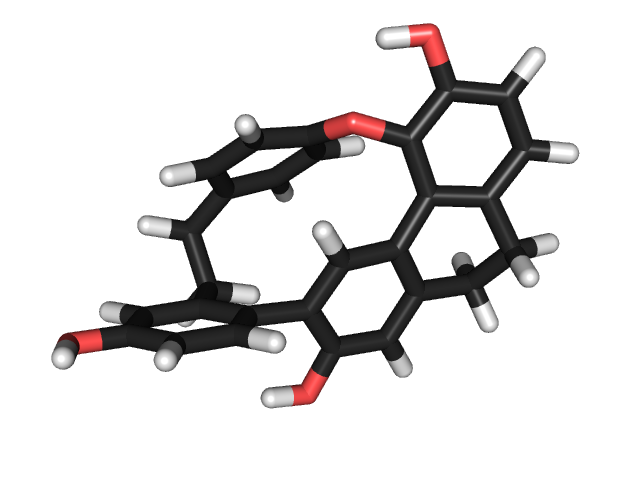
Cavicularin, three-dimensional representation

The liverwort was obtained from Mount Ishizuchi in the district of Shikoku. The material was dried for one day, ground to a powder and 5 grams were refluxed in methanol for 4 months to yield 2.5 mg (0.049%) of cavicularin after column chromatography and preparative TLC.

== Total synthesis ==
In 2005 and again in 2011, the compound was prepared by total synthesis together with the unstrained compound riccardin C. In 2013, several other syntheses were reported for it and a racemic synthesis.
