= Petalophyllum =

Scientific classification
- Kingdom: Plantae
- Division: Marchantiophyta
- Class: Jungermanniopsida
- Order: Fossombroniales
- Family: Petalophyllaceae
- Genus: Petalophyllum; Nees & Gottsche ex Lehmann

Species
- Petalophyllum americanum C.H. Ford & Crandall-Stotler; Petalophyllum hodgsoniae C.H. Ford & Crandall-Stotler; Petalophyllum indicum Kashyap; Petalophyllum preissii Lehmann; Petalophyllum ralfsii (Wilson) Nees & Gottsche ex Lehmann

Genus of liverworts

Petalophyllum, or petalwort, is a genus of liverworts in the order Fossombroniales.

The plants are small, reaching lengths of up to about 15 mm (0.6 in), and thallose; that is, the plant is not differentiated into root, stem, and leaf. The thallus consists of a midrib flanked by two wings that bear leaf-like lamellae on their dorsal surface. The ventral surface bears rhizoids and two rows of small scales.

Petalophyllum is dioicous. The gametangia are individually subtended by extensions of the dorsal lamellae. Antheridia occur in rows or clusters near the apex of the thallus. Archegonia are clustered and surrounded by a pesudoperianth. Asexual reproduction occurs via apical tubers.

== Species ==
Petalophyllum lives primarily in seasonally dry habitats on disturbed soils and sand dunes in North America, western Europe, northern Africa, India, New Zealand, and Western Australia. There are currently five recognized species:

- Petalophyllum americanum is endemic to the Gulf Coast of the United States in Arkansas, Louisiana, Mississippi, and Texas. It was first described as the European species P. ralfsii in 1919, but a detailed study later showed that the North American form is a distinct species.
- Petalophyllum hodgsoniae is known only from the type specimen, which was collected at Hawke's Bay on the North Island of New Zealand in 1947. It is considered threatened and possibly extinct.
- Petalophyllum indicum is found in the Punjab area of the Indian subcontinent.
- Petalophyllum preissii is known from the Swan River are of Western Australia and from the North Island of New Zealand.
- Petalophyllum ralfsii is found in the northern Mediterranean region as far east as Turkey, and along the Atlantic coast of Europe as far as northwest Scotland.
