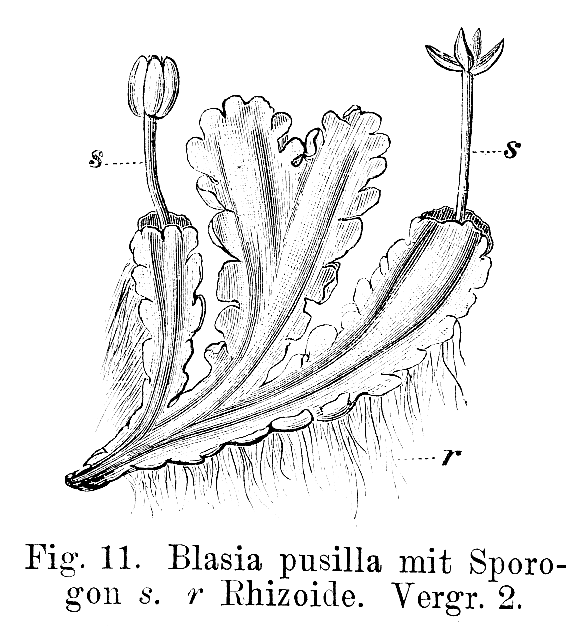
- Blasia pusilla from Strasburger's Lehrbuch der Botanik für Hochschulen, 1900

Scientific classification
- Kingdom: Plantae
- Division: Marchantiophyta
- Class: Marchantiopsida
- Subclass: Blasiidae; He-Nygrén
- Order: Blasiales; Stotler & Crand.-Stotl. 2000

Families
- Blasiaceae; †Treubiitaceae

Synonyms
- Blasiineae Schuster

= Blasiales =

Blasiales Temporal range: Late Carboniferous–Recent

Order of liverworts

Blasiales is an order of liverworts with a single living family and two species. The order has traditionally been classified among the Metzgeriales, but molecular cladistics suggests a placement at the base of the Marchantiopsida.

== Taxonomy ==
- Blasiales Stotler & Crandall-Stotler 2000
  - Blasiaceae von Klinggräff 1858
    - Blasia Linnaeus 1753
      - Blasia pusilla Linnaeus 1753
    - Cavicularia Stephani 1897 non Pavesi 1881
      - Cavicularia densa Stephani 1897
  - †Treubiitaceae Schuster 1980
    - †Treubiites Schuster 1966
      - †Treubiites kidstonii (Walton 1925) Schuster 1966
