= Sewardiella =

Conservation status
- Vulnerable (IUCN 2.3)

Scientific classification
- Kingdom: Plantae
- Division: Marchantiophyta
- Class: Jungermanniopsida
- Order: Fossombroniales
- Family: Petalophyllaceae
- Genus: Sewardiella; Kashyap
- Species: S. tuberifera

Binomial name
- Sewardiella tuberifera Kashyap

Genus of liverworts

Sewardiella is a genus of liverwort in the family Petalophyllaceae. It contains the single species, Sewardiella tuberifera, which is endemic to India. Its natural habitat is rocky areas, and it is threatened by habitat loss.
