= Riccardin C =

- Riccardin C, flat molecule representation

Names
- IUPAC name 14-oxapentacyclo[20.2.2.2^{10,13}.1^{15,19}.0^{2,7}]nonacosa-1(24),2(7),3,5,10(29),11,13(28),15,17,19(27),22,25-dodecaene-5,16,24-triol

Identifiers
CAS Number	84575-08-6
3D model (JSmol)	Interactive image
ChEMBL	ChEMBL411317
ChemSpider	8246532
PubChem CID	10070992
UNII	R9TH5VM6BD
CompTox Dashboard (EPA)	DTXSID101030291
- InChI: InChI=1S/C28H24O4/c29-22-9-13-24-21(17-22)8-3-18-4-10-23(11-5-18)32-28-16-20(7-14-26(28)30)2-1-19-6-12-25(24)27(31)15-19/h4-7,9-17,29-31H,1-3,8H2 Key: JMKSVONWZFVEAI-UHFFFAOYSA-N
- SMILES: C1CC2=C(C=CC(=C2)O)C3=C(C=C(CCC4=CC(=C(C=C4)O)OC5=CC=C1C=C5)C=C3)O

Properties
Chemical formula	C_{28}H_{24}O_{4}
Molar mass	424.49 g/mol
- Except where otherwise noted, data are given for materials in their standard state (at 25 °C [77 °F], 100 kPa). Infobox references

Riccardin C is a macrocyclic bis(bibenzyl). It is a secondary metabolite isolated from the Siberian cowslip subspecies Primula veris subsp. macrocalyx, in Reboulia hemisphaerica and in the Chinese liverwort Plagiochasma intermedium.

In 2005, the compound was prepared by total synthesis together with the strained compound cavicularin.
