= Allisonia =

Scientific classification
- Kingdom: Plantae
- Division: Marchantiophyta
- Class: Jungermanniopsida
- Order: Fossombroniales
- Family: Allisoniaceae (R.M.Schust. ex Grolle) Schljakov
- Genus: Allisonia; Herz.
- Species: A. cockaynei

Binomial name
- Allisonia cockaynei (Steph.) R.M.Schust.

Genus of liverworts

Allisonia cockaynei is the only species of liverwort in the genus Allisonia and family Allisoniaceae. It is endemic to New Zealand.

The genus Calycularia, formerly included within the Allisoniaceae, is now classified in its own family Calyculariaceae.

Allisoniaceae is one of only two liverwort families endemic to New Zealand, the other being Jubulopsidaceae. There are no moss or hornwort families endemic to New Zealand.
