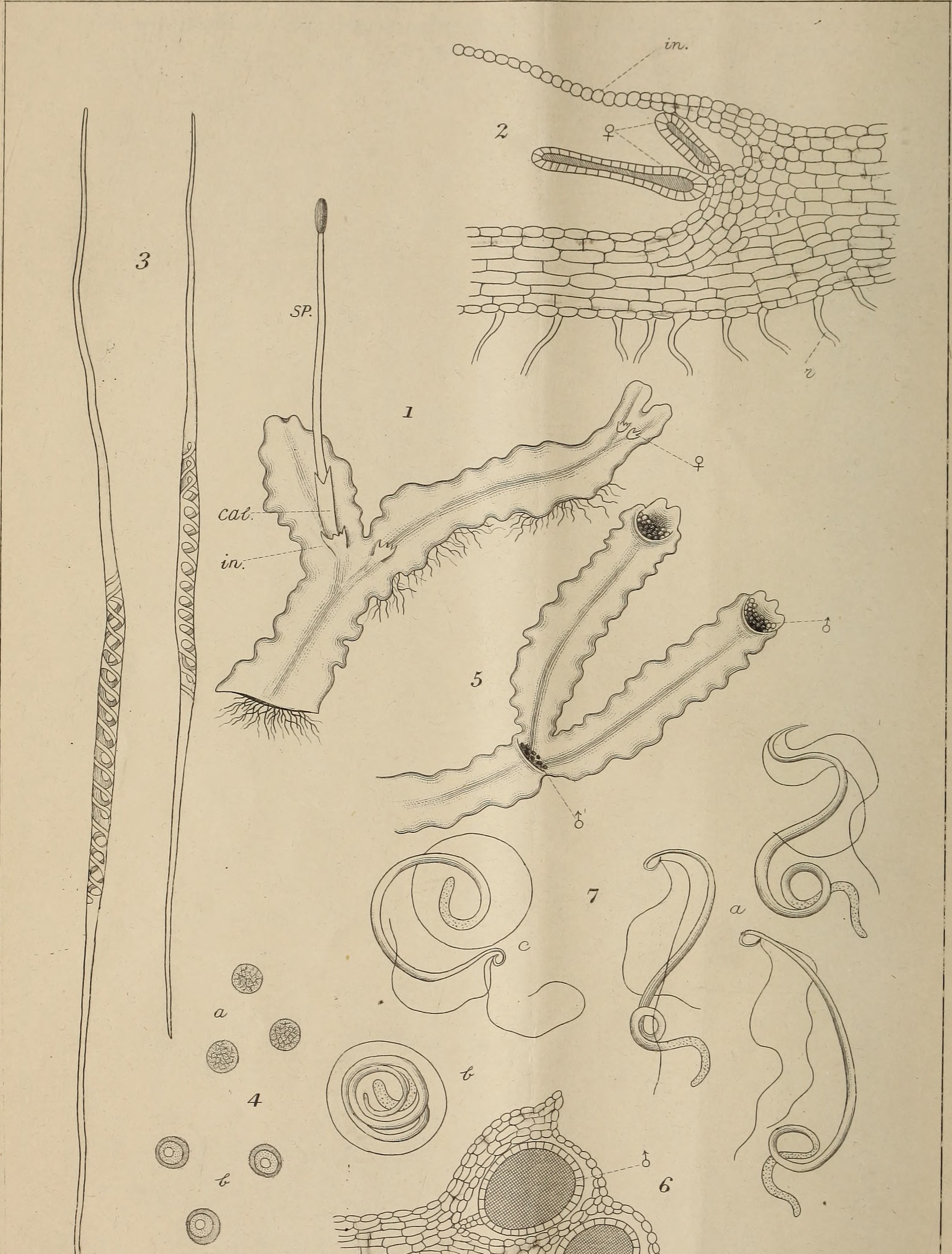
- Drawing of makinoa crispata, 1899

Scientific classification
- Kingdom: Plantae
- Division: Marchantiophyta
- Class: Jungermanniopsida
- Subclass: Pelliidae
- Order: Fossombroniales; He-Nygrén
- Family: Makinoaceae; Nakai
- Genus: Makinoa; Miyake
- Species: M. crispata

Binomial name
- Makinoa crispata (Steph.) Miyake

Synonyms
- Pellia crispata Steph.

= Makinoa =

Genus of liverworts

Makinoa crispata is the only species of liverwort in the genus Makinoa and family Makinoaceae. The genus Verdoornia was formerly included in this family, but has been transferred to the family Aneuraceae on the basis of recent cladistic analysis of genetic sequences.
