= Noteroclada =

Scientific classification
- Kingdom: Plantae
- Division: Marchantiophyta
- Class: Jungermanniopsida
- Order: Pelliales
- Family: Noterocladaceae; W.Frey & M.Stech
- Genus: Noteroclada; Taylor ex Hooker & Wilson 1844

Species
- Noteroclada confluens (Hooker & Taylor 1844) Spruce 1885; ?Noteroclada longiuscula Colenso 1887; ?Noteroclada arrhiza Spruce; See text.

Synonyms
- Androcryphia Nees 1846; Heteroclada Müller 1955

Genus of liverworts

Noteroclada is a small genus of liverworts of the Southern Hemisphere. It is classified in order Pelliales and is the only genus in the family Noterocladaceae within that order. Unlike Pellia, the other genus in the order, Noteroclada has a leafy appearance.

The species Noteroclada confluens is known primarily from the southern regions of South America, although it has been reported as far north as Costa Rica, and there is a report from New Zealand. A possible second species is known from South Africa.
