= Mizutania =

Scientific classification
- Kingdom: Plantae
- Division: Marchantiophyta
- Class: Jungermanniopsida
- Order: Jungermanniales
- Family: Calypogeiaceae
- Genus: Mizutania; Furuki & Z. Iwats.
- Species: M. riccardioides

Binomial name
- Mizutania riccardioides Furuki & Z. Iwats.

Genus of liverworts

Mizutania is a genus of liverworts restricted to tropical Asia, and contains a single species Mizutania riccardioides. It is classified in the order Jungermanniales and is a member of the family Calypogeiaceae within that order.

The genus name of Mizutania is in honour of Masami Mizutani (b.1930), who was a Japanese botanist (Bryology), who worked at the Hattori Botanical Laboratory.

The genus was circumscribed by Tatsuwo Furuki and Zennoske Iwatsuki in J. Hattori Bot. Lab. vol.67 on pages 291 and 294 in 1989. They placed it in the monotypic family Mizutaniaceae.
