= Planar chirality =

Planar chirality, also known as 2D chirality, is the special case of chirality for two dimensions.

Most fundamentally, planar chirality is a mathematical term, finding use in chemistry, physics and related physical sciences, for example, in astronomy, optics and metamaterials. Recent occurrences in latter two fields are dominated by microwave and terahertz applications as well as micro- and nanostructured planar interfaces for infrared and visible light.

== In chemistry ==
A planar DMAP derivative of ferrocene, used for kinetic resolution of some racemic secondary alcohols

This term is used in chemistry describe molecules that are chiral despite lacking an asymmetric carbon atom. In these cases, chirality results from the arrangement of groups extending out of a reference plane (chirality plane), which makes the molecule and its mirror image non-superposable. Examples include (E)-cyclooctene, some di- or poly-substituted metallocenes, and certain monosubstituted paracyclophanes. Nature rarely provides planar chiral molecules, cavicularin being an exception.

=== Assigning the configuration of planar chiral molecules ===
To assign the configuration of a planar chiral molecule, begin by selecting the pilot atom, which is the highest priority of the atoms that is not in the plane, but is directly attached to an atom in the plane. Next, assign the priority of the three adjacent in-plane atoms, starting with the atom attached to the pilot atom as priority 1, and preferentially assigning in order of highest priority if there is a choice. Then set the pilot atom to in front of the three atoms in question. If the three atoms reside in a clockwise direction when followed in order of priority, the molecule is assigned as R; when counterclockwise it is assigned as S.

== In optics and metamaterials ==
=== Chiral diffraction ===
Papakostas et al. observed in 2003 that planar chirality affects the polarization of light diffracted by arrays of planar chiral microstructures, where large polarization changes of opposite sign were detected in light diffracted from planar structures of opposite handedness.

=== Circular conversion dichroism ===
The study of planar chiral metamaterials has revealed that planar chirality is also associated with an optical effect in non-diffracting structures: the directionally asymmetric transmission (reflection and absorption) of circularly polarized waves. Planar chiral metamaterials, which are also anisotropic and lossy exhibit different total transmission (reflection and absorption) levels for the same circularly polarized wave incident on their front and back. The asymmetric transmission phenomenon arises from different, e.g. left-to-right, circular polarization conversion efficiencies for opposite propagation directions of the incident wave and therefore the effect is referred to as circular conversion dichroism. Like the twist of a planar chiral pattern appears reversed for opposite directions of observation, planar chiral metamaterials have interchanged properties for left-handed and right-handed circularly polarized waves that are incident on their front and back. In particular left-handed and right-handed circularly polarized waves experience opposite directional transmission (reflection and absorption) asymmetries.

=== Extrinsic planar chirality ===
Achiral components may form a chiral arrangement. In this case, chirality is not an intrinsic property of the components, but rather imposed extrinsically by their relative positions and orientations. This concept is typically applied to experimental arrangements, for example, an achiral (meta)material illuminated by a beam of light, where the illumination direction makes the whole experiment different from its mirror image. Extrinsic planar chirality results from illumination of any periodically structured interface for suitable illumination directions. Starting from normal incidence onto a periodically structured interface, extrinsic planar chirality arises from tilting the interface around any axis that does not coincide with a line of mirror symmetry of the interface. In the presence of losses, extrinsic planar chirality can result in circular conversion dichroism, as described above.

=== Chiral mirrors ===
Conventional mirrors reverse the handedness of circularly polarized waves upon reflection. In contrast, a chiral mirror reflects circularly polarized waves of one handedness without handedness change, while absorbing circularly polarized waves of the opposite handedness. A perfect chiral mirror exhibits circular conversion dichroism with ideal efficiency. Chiral mirrors can be realized by placing a planar chiral metamaterial in front of a conventional mirror. The concept has been exploited in holography to realize independent holograms for left-handed and right-handed circularly polarized electromagnetic waves. Active chiral mirrors that can be switched between left and right, or chiral mirror and conventional mirror, have been reported.

== See also ==
- Metamaterial
- Chirality (electromagnetism)
