= Calycularia =

Scientific classification
- Kingdom: Plantae
- Division: Marchantiophyta
- Class: Jungermanniopsida
- Subclass: Pelliidae
- Order: Fossombroniales; He-Nygrén, Juslén, Ahonen, Glenny & Piippo
- Family: Calyculariaceae; He-Nygrén, Juslén, Ahonen, Glenny & Piippo, 2006
- Genus: Calycularia; Mitt., 1861

Species
- Calycularia crispula Calycularia laxa

Genus of liverworts

Calycularia is the only genus of liverwort in the family Calyculariaceae. It was formerly included within the Allisoniaceae, and it includes only two species.
