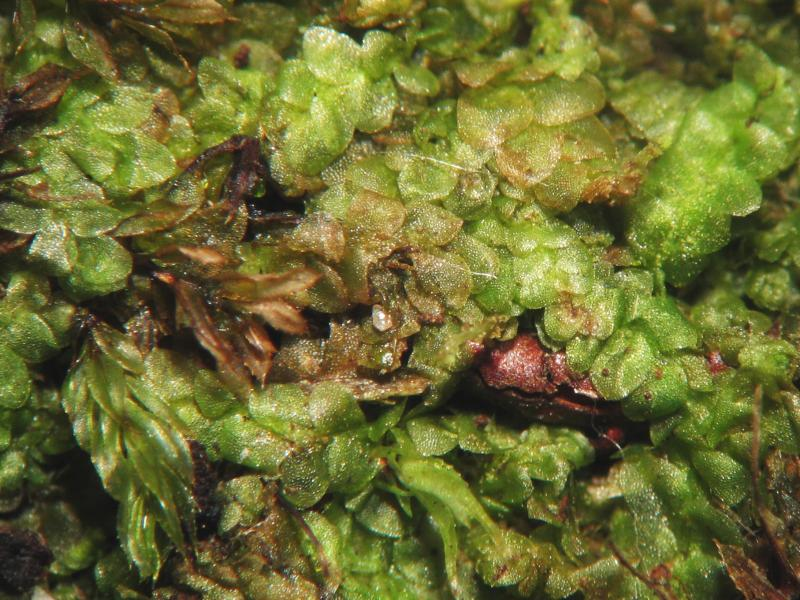
- Calypogeia muelleriana

Scientific classification
- Kingdom: Plantae
- Division: Marchantiophyta
- Class: Jungermanniopsida
- Order: Jungermanniales
- Family: Calypogeiaceae
- Genus: Calypogeia; Raddi

Synonyms
- Calypogea Dumortier, 1835; Calypogeja Raddi; Calypogia Dumortier, 1831; Kantia Lindb.

= Calypogeia =

Genus of liverworts

Calypogeia is a genus of liverworts in the family Calypogeiaceae.

The genus has cosmopolitan distribution.

== Species ==
As accepted by GBIF;

- Calypogeia aeruginosa Mitt.
- Calypogeia afrocaerulea E.W.Jones
- Calypogeia amazonica (Spruce) Steph.
- Calypogeia andicola Bischl.
- Calypogeia angusta Steph.
- Calypogeia annabonensis Steph.
- Calypogeia apiculata (Steph.) Steph.
- Calypogeia arguta Nees & Mont.
- Calypogeia asakawana S.Hatt. ex Inoue
- Calypogeia azorica Bischl.
- Calypogeia azurea Stotler & Crotz
- Calypogeia baldwinii Austin
- Calypogeia bidentula (F.Weber) Nees
- Calypogeia capensis S.W.Arnell
- Calypogeia ceylanica S.Hatt. & Mizut.
- Calypogeia contracta Inoue
- Calypogeia cordistipula (Stephani) Stephani
- Calypogeia cuspidata (Steph.) Steph.
- Calypogeia decurrens (Steph.) Steph.
- Calypogeia euthemona Spruce
- Calypogeia falcata Bischl.
- Calypogeia fissa (L.) Raddi
- Calypogeia formosana Horik.
- Calypogeia fujisana Inoue
- Calypogeia gigantea Stephani
- Calypogeia goebelii (Schiffn.) Steph.
- Calypogeia grandistipula (Steph.) Steph.
- Calypogeia granditexta Stephani
- Calypogeia granulata Inoue
- Calypogeia integristipula Steph.
- Calypogeia japonica Steph.
- Calypogeia khasiana Ajit P.Singh & V.Nath
- Calypogeia latissima Steph.
- Calypogeia laxa Gottsche & Lindenb.
- Calypogeia lechleri (Steph.) Steph.
- Calypogeia leptoloma (Spruce) Stephani
- Calypogeia longifolia Steph.
- Calypogeia lophocoleoides Steph.
- Calypogeia lunata Mitt.
- Calypogeia marginella Mitt.
- Calypogeia mascarenensis Bischl.
- Calypogeia microstipula (Steph.) Steph.
- Calypogeia miquelii Mont. ex Gottsche, Lindenb. & Nees
- Calypogeia muelleriana (Schiffn.) Müll.Frib.
- Calypogeia muscicola Steph.
- Calypogeia nasuensis Inoue
- Calypogeia neesiana (C.Massal. & Carestia) Müll.Frib.
- Calypogeia oblata Herzog
- Calypogeia obovata R.M.Schust.
- Calypogeia oniscoides Spruce
- Calypogeia orientalis Bucz. & Bakalin
- Calypogeia ovifolia Inoue
- Calypogeia peruviana Nees & Mont.
- Calypogeia rhombifolia (Spruce) Steph.
- Calypogeia sendaica Stephani
- Calypogeia sinensis Bakalin & Buczk.
- Calypogeia sphagnicola (Arnell & J.Perss.) Warnst. & Loeske
- Calypogeia stenzeliana Grolle
- Calypogeia stephaniana Broth. & P.de la Varde
- Calypogeia steyermarkii Fulford
- Calypogeia subintegra (Gottsche, Lindenb. & Nees) Bischl.
- Calypogeia suecica (Arnell & J.Perss.) Müll.Frib.
- Calypogeia sullivantii Austin
- Calypogeia tenax (Spruce) Steph.
- Calypogeia tosana (Steph.) Steph.
- Calypogeia tseukushiensis Amak.
- Calypogeia udarii Sudipa Das & D.K.Singh
- Calypogeia uleana (Stephani) Stephani
- Calypogeia uncinulatula Herzog
- Calypogeia verruculosa S.Hatt.
- Calypogeia vietnamica Bakalin & Vilnet Herzogia
- Calypogeia viridis Stephani
- Calypogeia yoshinagana Steph.Bull.Herb.Boissier
