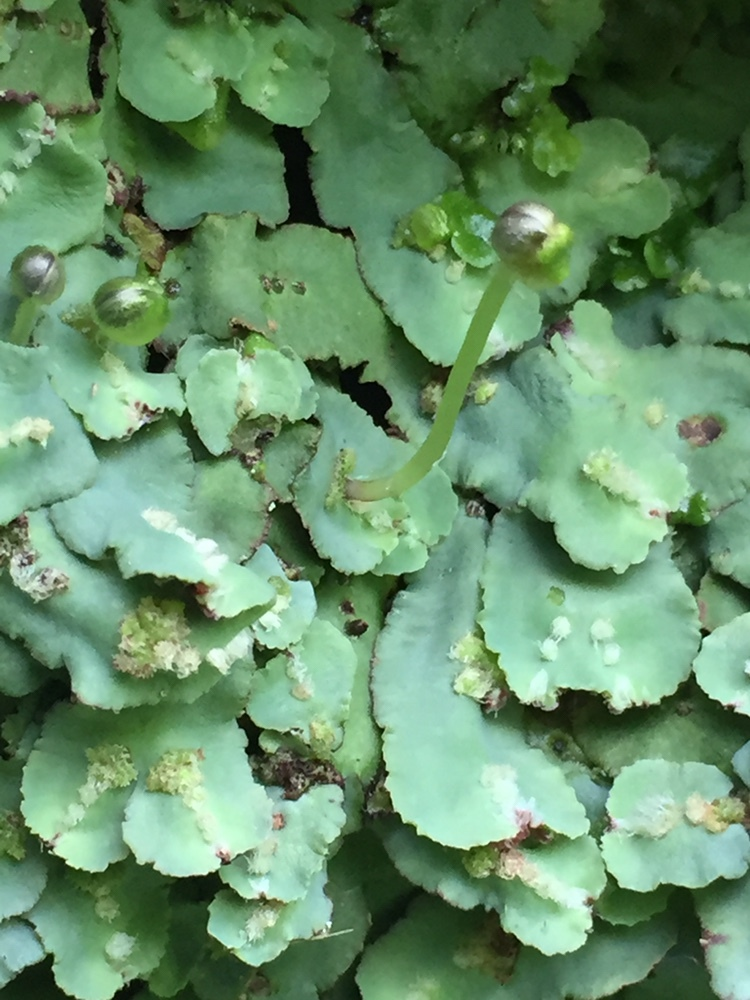
- Plagiochasma rupestre

Scientific classification
- Kingdom: Plantae
- Division: Marchantiophyta
- Class: Marchantiopsida
- Order: Marchantiales
- Family: Aytoniaceae
- Genus: Plagiochasma; Lehm. & Lindenb., 1832

Species
- See text

= Plagiochasma (plant) =

Genus of liverworts

Plagiochasma is a liverwort genus in the family Aytoniaceae.

== Species list ==
- Plagiochasma appendiculatum, Aitonia appendiculata
- Plagiochasma articulatum
- Plagiochasma beccarianum, Aytonia beccariana
- Plagiochasma bicornutum
- Plagiochasma cordatum, Aitonia fissisquama
- Plagiochasma crenulatum
- Plagiochasma cuneatum
- Plagiochasma denticulatum
- Plagiochasma eximium, Aitonia eximia
- Plagiochasma intermedium - China
- Plagiochasma japonicum
- Plagiochasma landii
- Plagiochasma martensii
- Plagiochasma megacarpon
- Plagiochasma microcephalum, Aitonia microcephala
- Plagiochasma muenchianum
- Plagiochasma nepalense, Antrocephalus nepalensis
- Plagiochasma pauriana
- Plagiochasma pterospermum
- Plagiochasma purandharensis
- Plagiochasma quadricornutum
- Plagiochasma rupestre, Aitonia australis
- Plagiochasma simlensis
- Plagiochasma wrightii
