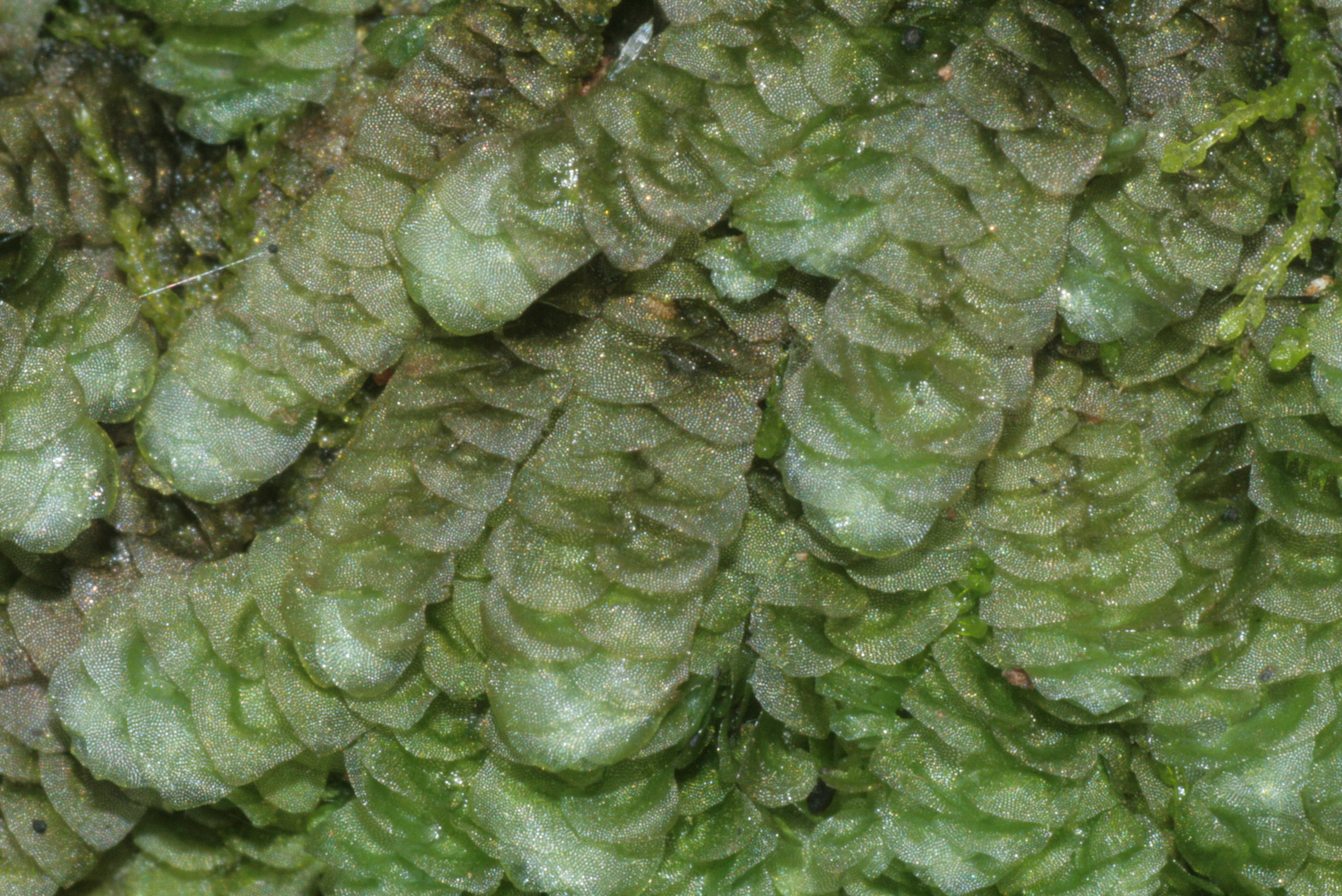
- Calypogeia azurea

Scientific classification
- Kingdom: Plantae
- Division: Marchantiophyta
- Class: Jungermanniopsida
- Order: Jungermanniales
- Family: Calypogeiaceae; Arnell

= Calypogeiaceae =

Family of liverworts

Calypogeiaceae is a family of liverworts. This type of plant is a calcifuge.

Genera:

- Calypogeia Raddi (101)
- Eocalypogeia (R.M.Schust.) R.M.Schust. (4)
- Metacalypogeia (S.Hatt.) Inoue (7)
- Mizutania Furuki & Z.Iwats. (1)
- Mnioloma Herzog (15)

Figures in brackets are approx. how many species per genus.
