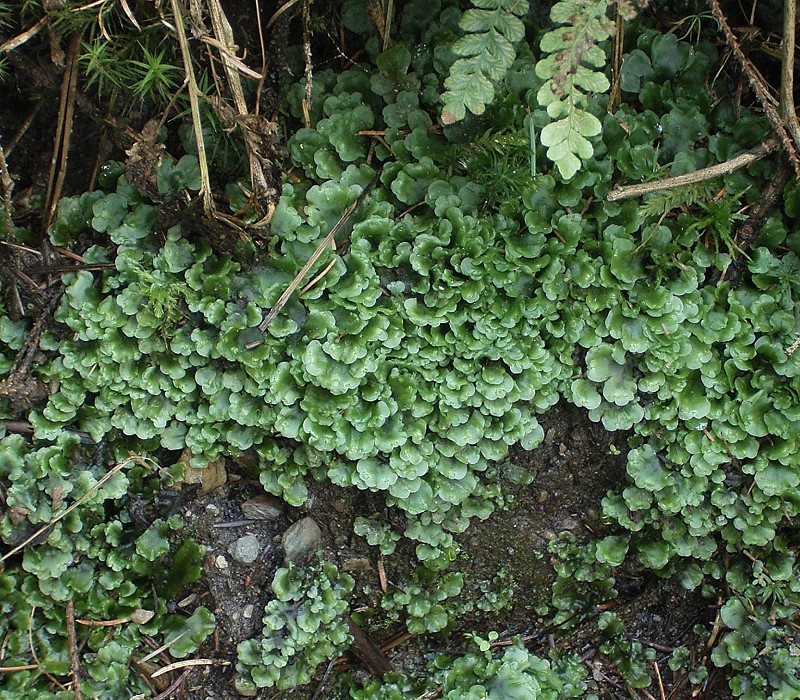
- Pellia epiphylla

Scientific classification
- Kingdom: Plantae
- Division: Marchantiophyta
- Class: Jungermanniopsida
- Order: Pelliales
- Family: Pelliaceae
- Genus: Pellia; Raddi, 1818 nom. cons.

Species
- See text

Synonyms
- Hypophyllum Post & Kuntze 1903 non Paulet 1808; Merkia Borkhausen 1792; Papa Gray 1821; Scopulina Dumortier 1822; Diplomitrion Corda 1829; Blytia Endlicher 1840 non Blyttia Arnott 1838]

= Pellia =

Genus of liverworts in the family Pelliaceae

Pellia is a small but widespread genus of liverworts in the cool and temperate regions of the northern hemisphere. It is classified in order Pelliales and is a member of the family Pelliaceae within that order.

Süsswassertang, a plant grown submerged in aquaria was once considered to be Pellia endiviifolia, but is now known to be the indeterminate gametophyte of a Lomariopsis species, a type of fern. Pellia liverworts are also often confused with Monosolenium tenerum, another liverwort.

== Species ==
Taxonomy based on work by Söderström et al. 2016

- Pellia cordaeana Trevisan 1877
- Pellia crispa Kummer 1875
- Pellia gottscheana Kreh 1909
- Pellia longifolia Kummer 1875
- Pellia undulata Kummer 1875
- (Apopellia) Grolle 1983a
  - P. (A.) alpicola (Schuster 1991) Damsholt 2007
  - P. (A.) endiviifolia (Dickson 1801) Dumortier 1835
  - P. (A.) megaspora Schuster 1981
- (Pellia) Raddi 1818
  - P. (P.) appalachiana Schuster 1991
  - P. (P.) epiphylla (Linnaeus 1753) Corda 1829
    - P. (P.) e. borealis (Lorbeer 1934) Messe 1981
    - P. (P.) e. epiphylla Messe 1981
  - P. (P.) neesiana (Gottsche 1867) Limpricht 1876
    - P. (P.) n. columbiana (Krajina & Brayshaw) Schuster
    - P. (P.) n. neesiana (Gottsche 1867) Limpricht 1876
