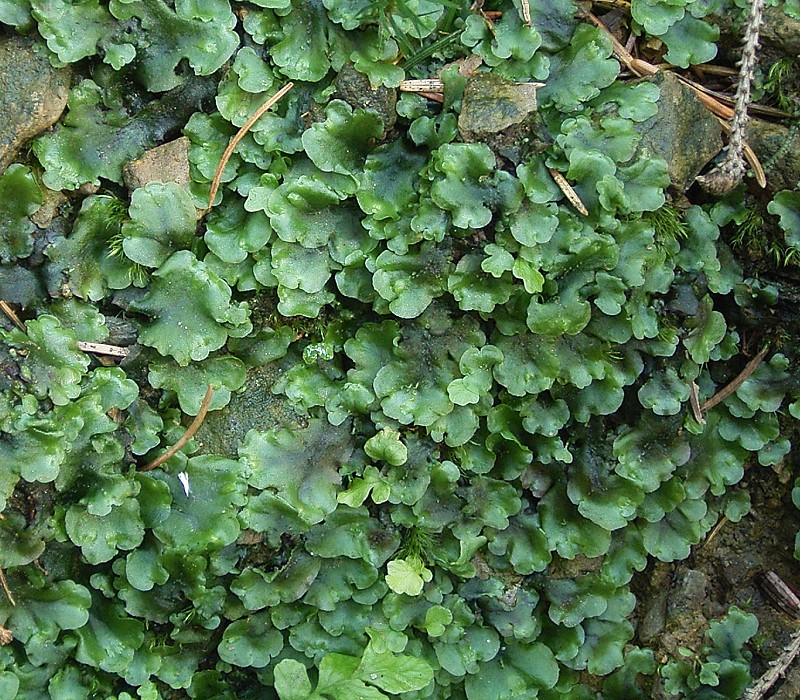
- Pellia epiphylla growing on moist soil

Scientific classification
- Kingdom: Plantae
- Division: Marchantiophyta
- Class: Jungermanniopsida
- Subclass: Pelliidae
- Order: Pelliales

Families
- Noterocladaceae Frey & Stech 2005; Pelliaceae von Klinggräff 1858

= Pelliales =

Order of liverworts

Pelliales is an order of liverworts.

== Classification ==
Taxonomy based on work by Söderström et al. 2016 and synonyms from Collection of genus-group names in a systematic arrangement.

- Noterocladaceae Frey & Stech 2005
  - Noteroclada Taylor ex Hooker & Wilson 1844
- Pelliaceae von Klinggräff 1858
  - Pellia Raddi 1818 nom. cons.
