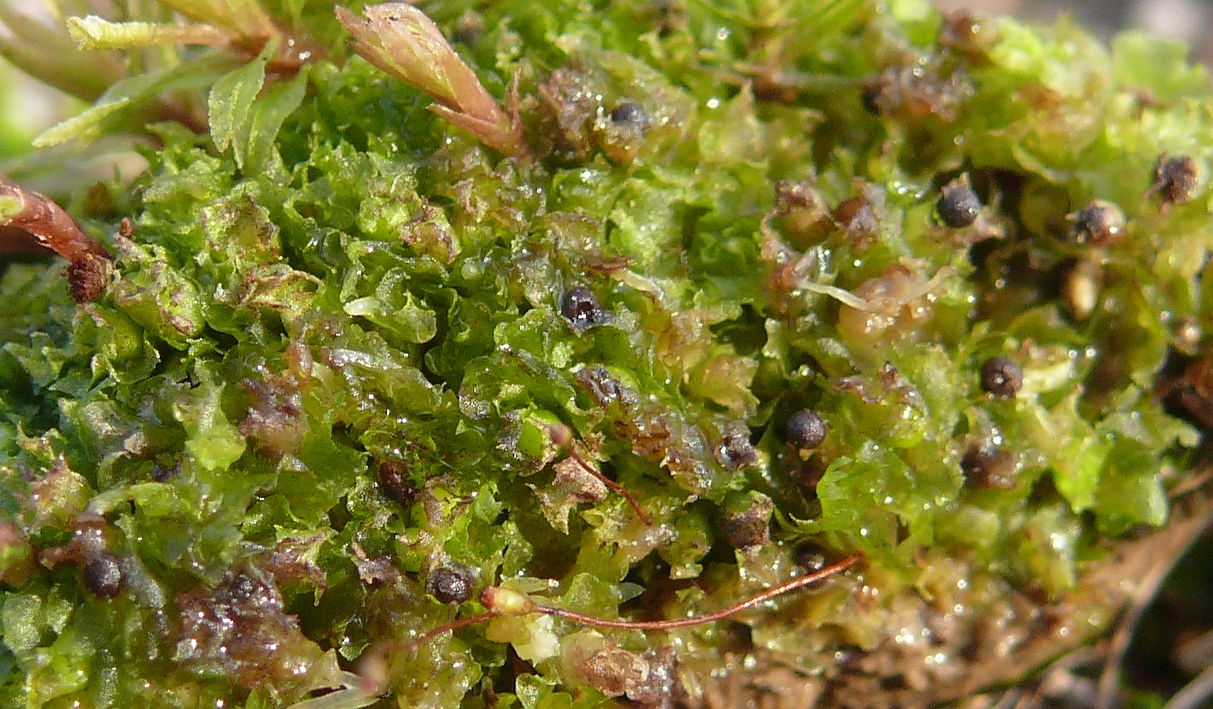
- Fossombronia sp.

Scientific classification
- Kingdom: Plantae
- Division: Marchantiophyta
- Class: Jungermanniopsida
- Subclass: Pelliidae
- Order: Fossombroniales; Schljakov

Families
- Allisoniaceae; Calyculariaceae; Fossombroniaceae; Makinoaceae; Petalophyllaceae

= Fossombroniales =

Order of liverworts

Fossombroniales is an order of liverworts.

== Taxonomy ==
- Allisoniaceae Schljakov
  - Allisonia
- Fossombroniaceae Hazsl., nom. cons.
  - Fossombronia
- Calyculariaceae He-Nygrén et al.
  - Calycularia
- Makinoaceae Nakai
  - Makinoa
- Petalophyllaceae Stotler & Crandall-Stotler
  - Petalophyllum
  - Sewardiella
