= Petalophyllaceae =

Scientific classification
- Kingdom: Plantae
- Division: Marchantiophyta
- Class: Jungermanniopsida
- Order: Fossombroniales
- Family: Petalophyllaceae; Stotler & Crand.-Stotl.

Genera
- Petalophyllum; Sewardiella

Family of liverworts

Petalophyllaceae is a family of liverworts in the order Fossombroniales. Most species are thallose; that is, the plant is not differentiated into root, stem, and leaf. The thallus is typically small and bears lamellae on its dorsal surface that give it a ruffled, leafy appearance.

The family includes two extant genera, Petalophyllum and Sewardiella.
