= P. exigua =

P. exigua may refer to:

- Partula exigua, an extinct snail
- Parvocaulis exigua, a green algae
- Parvulastra exigua, a sea star
- Patella exigua, a true limpet
- Pelegrina exigua, a jumping spider
- Peperomia exigua, a radiator plant
- Perigona exigua, a ground beetle
- Phaneroptera exigua, an Old World katydid
- Phasmoneura exigua, a carnivorous insect
- Philine exigua, a headshield slug
- Phoma exigua, a plant pathogen
- Phorocera exigua, a tachina fly
- Phycolepidozia exigua, a liverwort endemic to Dominica
- Phyllosticta exigua, a sac fungus
- Plagiolepis exigua, a formic-acid-producing ant
- Platythyrea exigua, a predaceous ant
- Plecopterodes exigua, an Afrotropical moth
- Pleurothallis exigua, a bonnet orchid
- Ponometia exigua, an American moth
- Prenanthella exigua, a flowering plant
- Prumnopitys exigua, a Bolivian conifer
- Pseudopoda exigua, a huntsman spider
- Psilogramma exigua, a hawk moth
- Purpurcapsula exigua, a false cowry
- Puya exigua, a plant endemic to Ecuador
