= Tarachidia =

Scientific classification
- Kingdom: Animalia
- Phylum: Arthropoda
- Class: Insecta
- Order: Lepidoptera
- Superfamily: Noctuoidea
- Family: Noctuidae
- Subfamily: Acontiinae
- Genus: Tarachidia; Hampson, 1898

Genus of moths

Tarachidia was a genus of moths of the family Noctuidae, it is now considered a synonym of Ponometia.

== Former species ==
- Tarachidia alata Smith, 1905
- Tarachidia albimargo Barnes & McDunnough, 1916
- Tarachidia albisecta Hampson, 1910
- Tarachidia albitermen Barnes & McDunnough, 1916
- Tarachidia bicolorata Barnes & McDunnough, 1912
- Tarachidia binocula Grote, 1875
- Tarachidia bruchi Breyer, 1931
- Tarachidia candefacta Hübner, [1831]
- Tarachidia carmelita Dyar, 1914
- Tarachidia clausula Grote, 1882
- Tarachidia corrientes Hampson, 1910
- Tarachidia cuta Smith, 1905
- Tarachidia dorneri Barnes & McDunnough, 1913
- Tarachidia erastrioides Guenée, 1852
- Tarachidia flavibasis Hampson, 1898
- Tarachidia heonyx Dyar, 1913
- Tarachidia huita Smith, 1903
- Tarachidia libedis Smith, 1900
- Tarachidia margarita Schaus, 1904
- Tarachidia marginata Köhler, 1979
- Tarachidia mixta Möschler, 1890
- Tarachidia morsa Köhler, 1979
- Tarachidia nannodes Hampson, 1910
- Tarachidia nigrans Köhler, 1979
- Tarachidia parvula Walker, 1865
- Tarachidia phecolisca Druce, 1889
- Tarachidia semibrunnea Druce, 1909
- Tarachidia semiflava Guenée, 1852
- Tarachidia septuosa Blanchard & Knudson, 1986
- Tarachidia tortricina Zeller, 1872
- Tarachidia venustula Walker, 1865
- Tarachidia virginalis Grote, 1881
- Tarachidia viridans Smith, 1904
