= Obtusifolium =

Scientific classification
- Kingdom: Plantae
- Division: Marchantiophyta
- Class: Jungermanniopsida
- Order: Lophoziales
- Family: Obtusifoliaceae
- Genus: Obtusifolium; S.W.Arnell, 1956

Genus of liverworts

Obtusifolium is a monotypic genus of liverworts belonging to the family Cephaloziellaceae.

The sole species of this genus, Obtusifolium obtusum (Lindb.) S.W.Arnell is found in Europe and Russia.

The genus and the species were described and published in Ill. Moss Fl. Fennoscandia. I. Hepat. 133 in 1956.
