= Scapania paludicola =

Scientific classification
- Kingdom: Plantae
- Division: Marchantiophyta
- Class: Jungermanniopsida
- Order: Lophoziales
- Family: Scapaniaceae
- Genus: Scapania
- Species: S. paludicola

Binomial name
- Scapania paludicola Loeske & Müll.Frib.

Species of liverwort

Scapania paludicola is a species of liverwort belonging to the family Scapaniaceae.

It is native to the Northern Hemisphere.
