= Cephaloziella elachista =

Scientific classification
- Kingdom: Plantae
- Division: Marchantiophyta
- Class: Jungermanniopsida
- Order: Lophoziales
- Family: Cephaloziellaceae
- Genus: Cephaloziella
- Species: C. elachista

Binomial name
- Cephaloziella elachista (J.B.Jack) Schiffner

Species of liverwort

Cephaloziella elachista is a species of liverwort belonging to the family Cephaloziellaceae.

Synonyms:

- Cephalozia elachista (J.B.Jack) Lindb.
- Jungermannia elachista J.B.Jack
