= Kymatocalyx rhizomaticus =

Conservation status
- Least Concern (IUCN 2.3)

Scientific classification
- Kingdom: Plantae
- Division: Marchantiophyta
- Class: Jungermanniopsida
- Order: Lophoziales
- Family: Cephaloziellaceae
- Genus: Kymatocalyx
- Species: K. rhizomaticus

Binomial name
- Kymatocalyx rhizomaticus (Herzog) Gradst. & Váňa

Synonyms
- Stenorrhipis rhizomatica Herzog (basionym)

Species of liverwort

Kymatocalyx rhizomaticus, synonym Stenorrhipis rhizomatica, is a species of liverwort in the Cephaloziellaceae family. According to the 2000 IUCN Red List, where it was assessed under the synonym Stenorrhipis rhizomatica, it is endemic to Sarawak. Other sources give its distribution as Central America and northern South America.
