= Andrewsianthus =

Scientific classification
- Kingdom: Plantae
- Division: Marchantiophyta
- Class: Jungermanniopsida
- Order: Lophoziales
- Family: Lophoziaceae
- Genus: Andrewsianthus; R.M.Schust.

Species
- See text

Genus of liverworts

Andrewsianthus is a genus of liverworts in the family Lophoziaceae.

The genus has a cosmopolitan distribution, mainly in the Southern Hemisphere.

It was originally published by Rudolf Mathias Schuster in Rev. Bryol. Lichénol. 30: 66 in 1961.

The genus name of Andrewsianthus is in honour of Albert LeRoy Andrews (1878-1962) an American professor of Germanic philology and an avocational bryologist, known as "one of the world’s foremost bryologists and the American authority on Sphagnaceae.

== Species ==
Between 19, and 24 species are known:

- Andrewsianthus aberrans (Nees & Mont.) Grolle
- Andrewsianthus australis J.J.Engel
- Andrewsianthus bidens (Mitt. ex Steph.) R.M.Schust.
- Andrewsianthus bilobus (Mitt.) Grolle
- Andrewsianthus carinatus Grolle
- Andrewsianthus cavifolius Grolle & Váňa
- Andrewsianthus chimbuensis R.M.Schust.
- Andrewsianthus cuspidatus R.M.Schust.
- Andrewsianthus ferrugineus Grolle
- Andrewsianthus hodgsoniae (R.M.Schust.) R.M.Schust. ex J.J.Engel
- Andrewsianthus jamesonii (Mont.) Váňa
- Andrewsianthus kilimanjaricus (S.W.Arnell) Grolle & Váňa
- Andrewsianthus kinabaluensis N.Kitag.
- Andrewsianthus koponenii Váňa & Piippo
- Andrewsianthus marionensis (S.W.Arnell) Grolle
- Andrewsianthus mizutanii N.Kitag.
- Andrewsianthus papillosus N.Kitag.
- Andrewsianthus perigonialis (Hook.f. & Taylor) R.M.Schust.
- Andrewsianthus puniceus (Nees) R.M.Schust. ex Grolle
- Andrewsianthus recurvifolius (Nees) R.M.Schust.
- Andrewsianthus scabrellus (C.Massal.) R.M.Schust. ex J.J.Engel
- Andrewsianthus sphenoloboides (R.M.Schust.) R.M.Schust. ex J.J.Engel
- Andrewsianthus squarrosus (S.W.Arnell) Grolle
- Andrewsianthus sundaicus (Schiffn.) R.M.Schust.
- Andrewsianthus zantenii Váňa
