= Scapania sphaerifera =

Conservation status
- Near Threatened (IUCN 3.1)(Global)

- Critically endangered, possibly extinct (IUCN 3.1) (Europe)

Scientific classification
- Kingdom: Plantae
- Division: Marchantiophyta
- Class: Jungermanniopsida
- Order: Lophoziales
- Family: Scapaniaceae
- Genus: Scapania
- Species: S. sphaerifera

Binomial name
- Scapania sphaerifera Buch & Tuom.

Species of liverwort

Scapania sphaerifera is a species of plants in the family Scapaniaceae. It is endemic to Russia, and was first described in 1936 in Murmansk. Its natural habitat is rocky areas.
