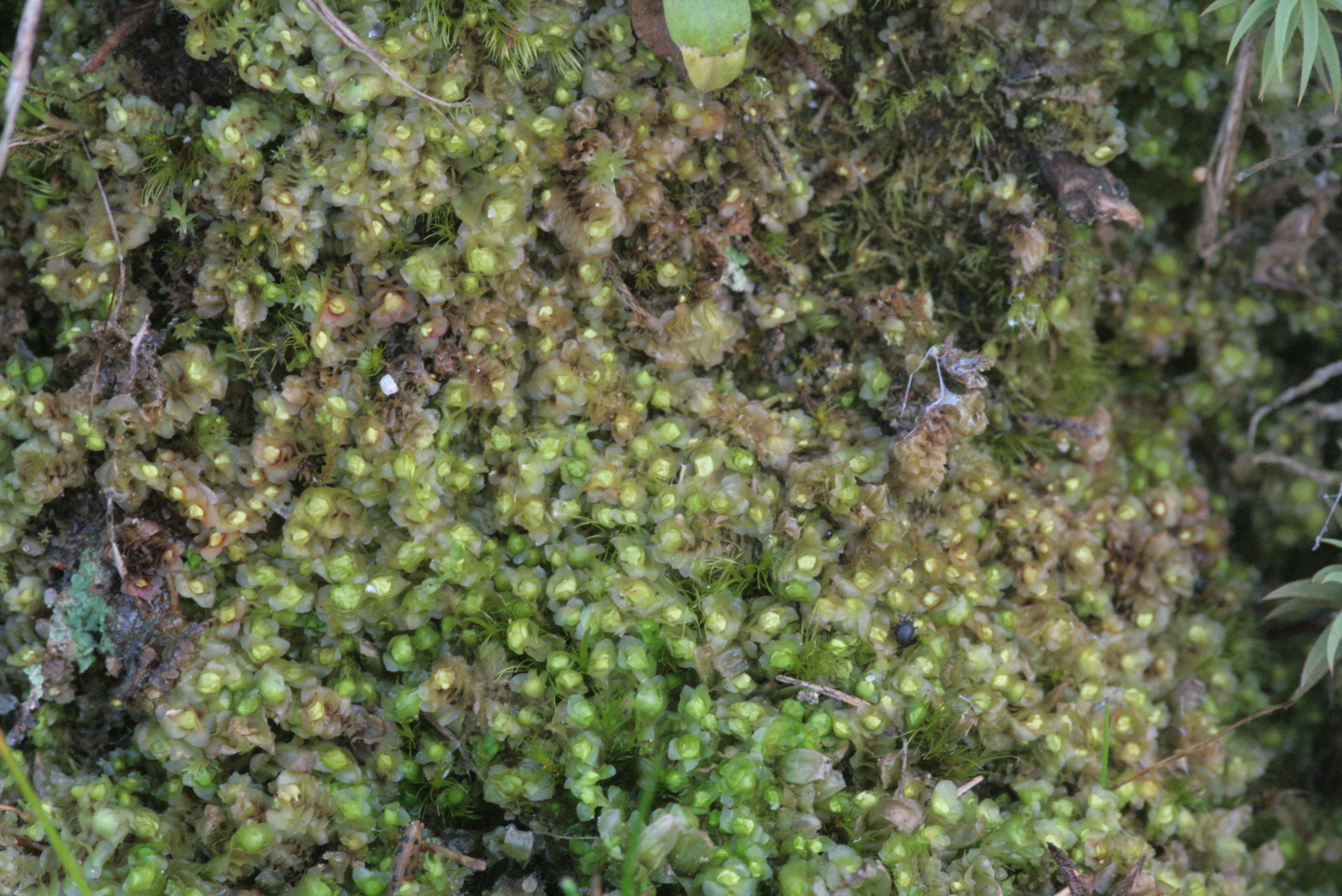
- In Austria

Scientific classification
- Kingdom: Plantae
- Clade: Embryophytes
- Division: Marchantiophyta
- Class: Jungermanniopsida
- Order: Lophoziales
- Family: Scapaniaceae
- Genus: Scapania
- Species: S. curta

Binomial name
- Scapania curta (Mart.) Dumort.

= Scapania curta =

Species of liverwort

Scapania curta is a species of liverwort belonging to the family Scapaniaceae. It is native to the Northern Hemisphere.
