= Cephaloziella elegans =

Scientific classification
- Kingdom: Plantae
- Division: Marchantiophyta
- Class: Jungermanniopsida
- Order: Lophoziales
- Family: Cephaloziellaceae
- Genus: Cephaloziella
- Species: C. elegans

Binomial name
- Cephaloziella elegans (Heeg) Schiffn., 1900

Synonyms
- Cephalozia elegans Heeg; Cephaloziella rubella var. elegans (Heeg) R.M. Schust.

Species of liverwort

Cephaloziella elegans is a species of liverworts. It is found in the Russian Federation.
