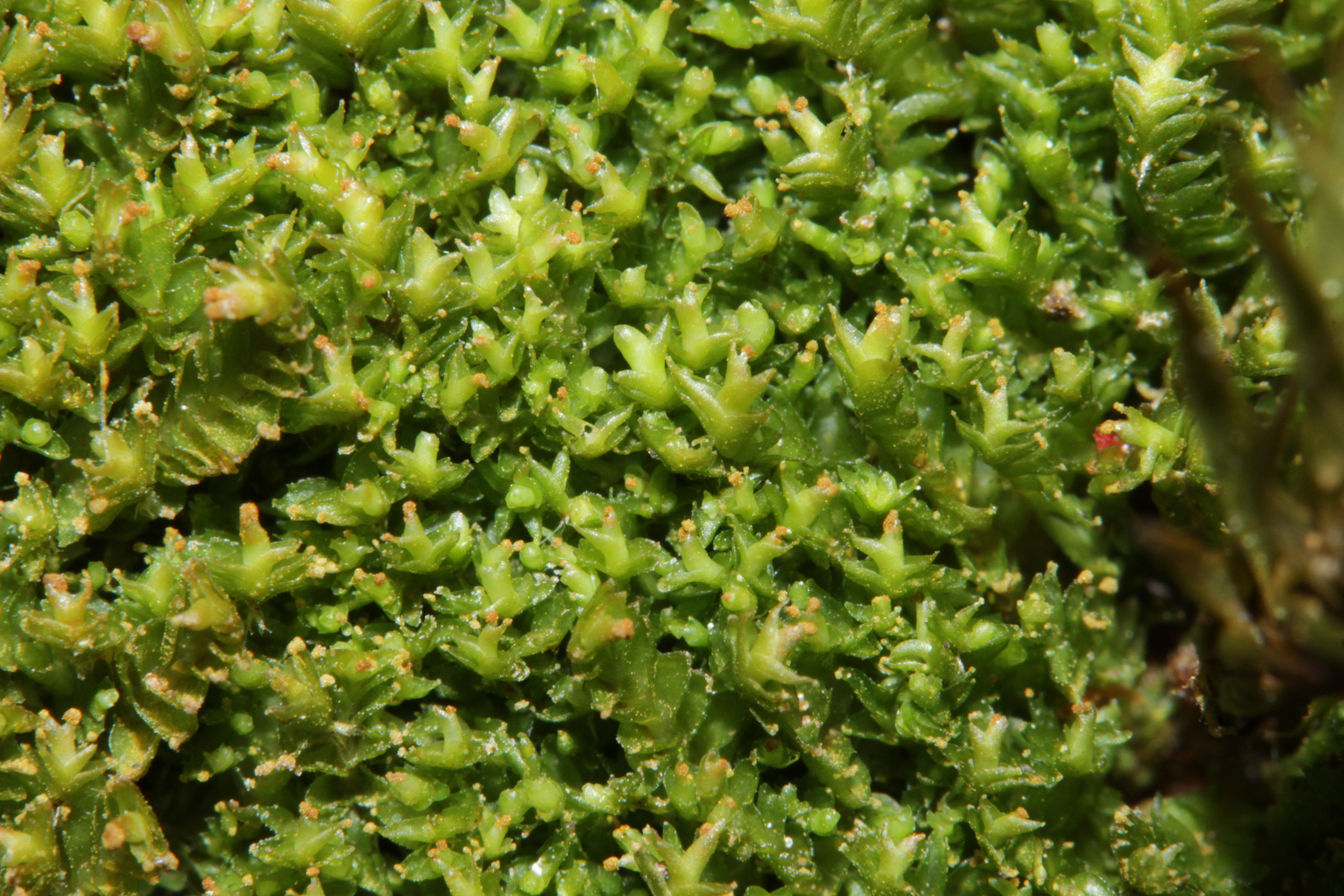

Scientific classification
- Kingdom: Plantae
- Division: Marchantiophyta
- Class: Jungermanniopsida
- Order: Lophoziales
- Family: Lophoziaceae
- Genus: Tritomaria
- Species: T. exsectiformis

Binomial name
- Tritomaria exsectiformis (Breidl.) Schiffn. ex Loeske

= Tritomaria exsectiformis =

Species of liverwort

Tritomaria exsectiformis is a species of liverwort belonging to the family Lophoziaceae.

It is native to the Northern Hemisphere.
