= Phycolepidozia exigua =

Conservation status
- Critically Endangered (IUCN 2.3)

Scientific classification
- Kingdom: Plantae
- Division: Marchantiophyta
- Class: Jungermanniopsida
- Order: Lophoziales
- Family: Cephaloziellaceae
- Genus: Phycolepidozia
- Species: P. exigua

Binomial name
- Phycolepidozia exigua R.M.Schust.

Genus of liverworts

Phycolepidozia exigua is a species of liverwort in the family Cephaloziellaceae. It was thought to be the only species in the genus until a new species from India, Phycolepidozia indica, was found in 2014. Phycolepidozia exigua is endemic to Dominica, where it is critically endangered. Its natural habitat is subtropical or tropical moist lowland forests.

The species is unique among the leafy liverworts in the extreme reduction of its lateral leaves. These leaves consist of only two cells at maturity, so that plants are essentially leafless.
