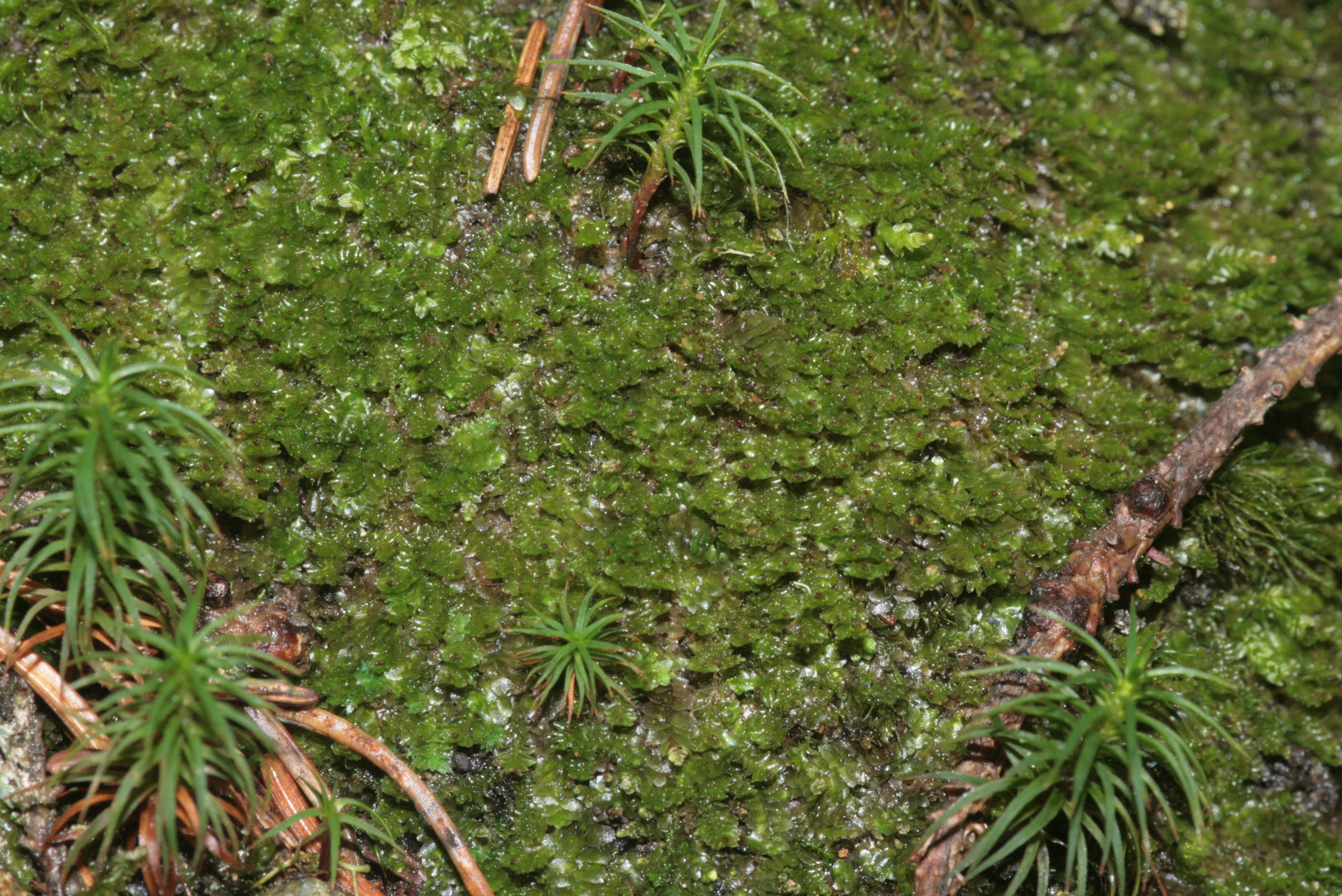
- Tritomaria exsecta

Scientific classification
- Kingdom: Plantae
- Clade: Embryophytes
- Division: Marchantiophyta
- Class: Jungermanniopsida
- Order: Lophoziales
- Family: Lophoziaceae
- Genus: Tritomaria; Schiffn. ex Loeske

= Tritomaria =

Genus of liverworts

Tritomaria is a genus of liverworts belonging to the family Lophoziaceae.

The genus was first described by Victor Félix Schiffner based on an earlier description by Leopold Loeske.

The genus has cosmopolitan distribution.

== Species ==
As accepted by GBIF:

- Tritomaria camerunensis S.W.Arnell
- Tritomaria exsecta (Schmidel) Schiffn. ex Loeske
- Tritomaria exsectiformis (Breidl.) Schiffn. ex Loeske
- Tritomaria ferruginea (Grolle) Váňa
- Tritomaria heterophylla R.M.Schust.
- Tritomaria koreana Bakalin, S.S.Choi & B.Y.Sun
- Tritomaria mexicana Bakalin
- Tritomaria polita (Nees) Jörg.
- Tritomaria scitula (Taylor) Jørg.
