= Chaetophyllopsis =

Scientific classification
- Kingdom: Plantae
- Division: Marchantiophyta
- Class: Jungermanniopsida
- Order: Lophoziales
- Family: Cephaloziellaceae
- Genus: Chaetophyllopsis; R.M.Schust.

Genus of liverworts

Chaetophyllopsis is a genus of liverworts belonging to the family Cephaloziellaceae.

The species of this genus are found in Australia.

Species:

- Chaetophyllopsis whiteleggei (Carrington & Pearson) R.M.Schust. ex Hamlin
