= Carl Moritz Gottsche =

German physician and bryologist

Carl Moritz Gottsche (3 July 1808 – 28 September 1892) was a German physician and bryologist born in Altona. He was the father of geologist Carl Christian Gottsche (1859-1909).

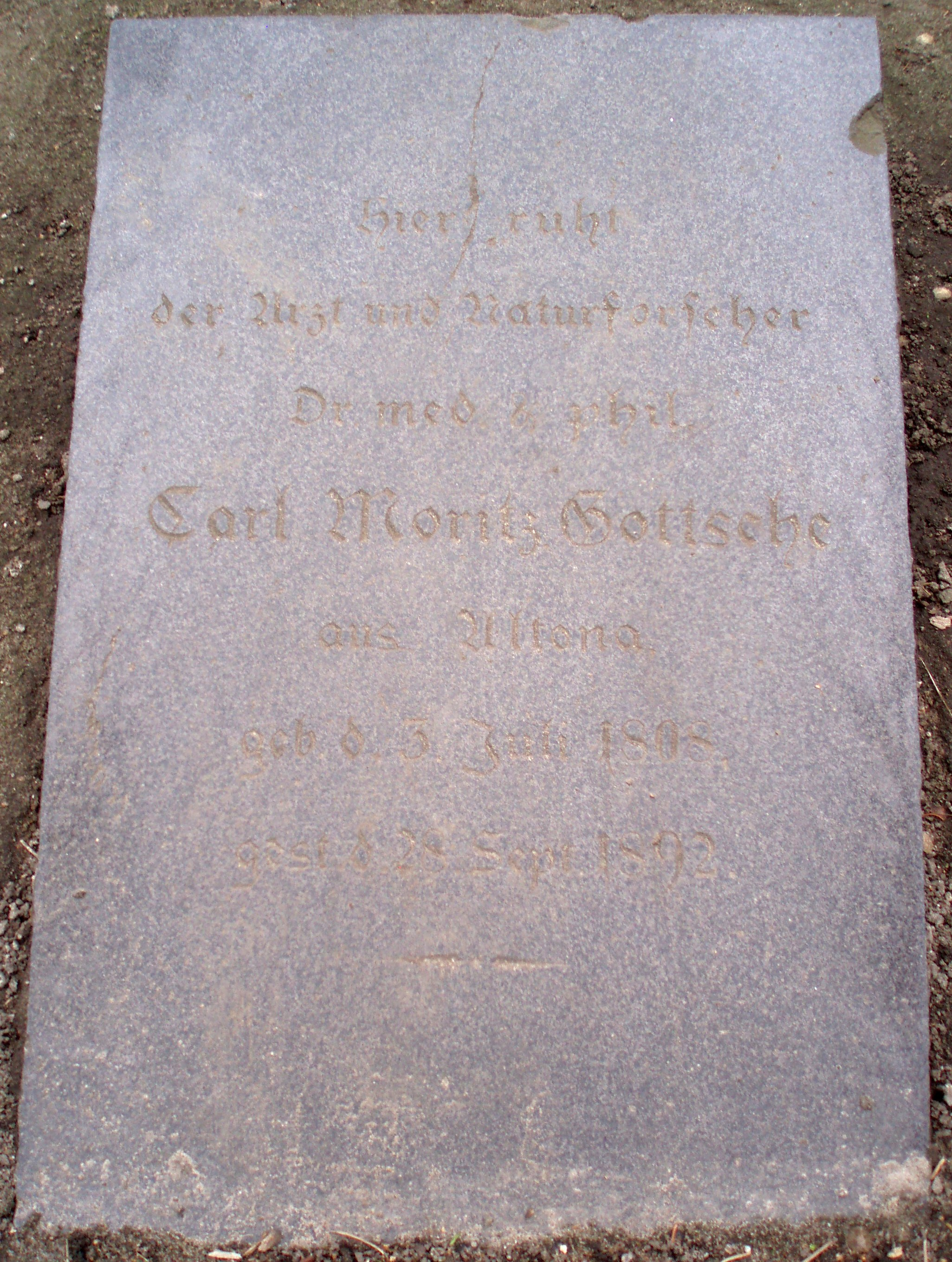
Grave marker of Gottsche at Friedhof Norderreihe Hamburg-Altona

Gottsche was a leading authority of Hepaticae. With Christian Gottfried Daniel Nees von Esenbeck (1776-1858) and Johann Bernhard Wilhelm Lindenberg (1781-1851), he was author of Synopsis Hepaticarum (1844-47), which was a landmark work in the field of hepaticology. Together with Gottlob Ludwig Rabenhorst he issued and distributed no. 221 until no. 600 of the exsiccata series Hepaticae Europaeae. Die Lebermoose Europa's unter Mitwirkung mehrer namhafter Botaniker.

In 1881 he received an honorary doctorate in philosophy from the University of Kiel.

The botanical genera of liverworts; Gottschea in the family Schistochilaceae is named after him, as well as Gottschelia, which is in the family Cephaloziellaceae.
