= Conochares =

Scientific classification
- Domain: Eukaryota
- Kingdom: Animalia
- Phylum: Arthropoda
- Class: Insecta
- Order: Lepidoptera
- Superfamily: Noctuoidea
- Family: Noctuidae
- Subfamily: Acontiinae
- Genus: Conochares; Smith, 1905

Genus of moths

Conochares was a genus of moths of the family Noctuidae, it is now considered a synonym of Ponometia.

== Former species ==
- Conochares acutus Smith, 1905
- Conochares altera Smith, 1903
- Conochares arizonae H. Edwards, 1878
- Conochares catalina Smith, 1906
- Conochares elegantula Harvey, 1876
- Conochares rectangula McDunnough, 1943
