= Oleolophozia =

Scientific classification
- Kingdom: Plantae
- Division: Marchantiophyta
- Class: Jungermanniopsida
- Order: Lophoziales
- Family: Oleolophoziaceae
- Genus: Oleolophozia; L.Söderstr., De Roo & Hedd.
- Species: O. perssonii

Binomial name
- Oleolophozia perssonii (H.Buch & S.W.Arnell) L.Söderstr., De Roo & Hedd.

Genus of liverworts

Oleolophozia is a monotypic genus of liverworts of the monotypic family Oleolophoziaceae. The family was described in 2024. The sole species of this genus, Oleolophozia perssonii, is found in Europe and Russia. Both the genus and the species were described and published in 2010. The genus was formerly placed in family Cephaloziellaceae.
