= Douin =

Douin may refer to:

- Charles Isidore Douin (1858–1944), French botanist
- Jean-Philippe Douin (1940–2016), French Air Force general
