= Lophoziopsis =

Scientific classification
- Kingdom: Plantae
- Division: Marchantiophyta
- Class: Jungermanniopsida
- Order: Lophoziales
- Family: Lophoziaceae
- Genus: Lophoziopsis; Konstant. & Vilnet

Genus of liverworts

Lophoziopsis is a genus of liverworts belonging to the family Lophoziaceae.

The genus has almost cosmopolitan distribution.

== Species ==
As accepted by GBIF;

- Lophoziopsis excisa (Dicks.) Konstant. & Vilnet
- Lophoziopsis jurensis (Meyl. ex Müll.Frib.) Mamontov & Vilnet
- Lophoziopsis longidens (Lindb.) Konstant. & Vilnet
- Lophoziopsis pellucida (R.M.Schust.) Konstant. & Vilnet
- Lophoziopsis polaris (R.M.Schust.) Konstant. & Vilnet
- Lophoziopsis propagulifera (Gottsche) Konstant. & Vilnet
- Lophoziopsis rubrigemma (R.M.Schust.) Konstant. & Vilnet
