= Charles Isidore Douin =

French botanist (1858–1944)

- Born: February 1858; Bouville, Eure-et-Loir, France
- Died: 7 June 1944 (aged 86); Chartres, France
- Notable work: Nouvelle flore des mousses et des hépatiques pour la détermination facile des espèces
- Scientific career
- Fields: bryology

Charles Isidore Douin (1858 – 1944) was a French bryologist who was a native of Bouville, Eure-et-Loir.

== Biography ==
He taught school in Chartres, and was the author of a highly regarded work on mosses and liverworts titled Nouvelle flore des mousses et des hépatiques pour la détermination facile des espèces (1892). He also published a book involving bryology of Eure-et-Loir, Muscinées d'Eure-et-Loir (1906).

The liverwort genus Douinia from the family Scapaniaceae is named in his honor in 1928.
