= Bouville =

Bouville is the name of three communes in France:

- Bouville, Eure-et-Loir
- Bouville, Seine-Maritime
- Bouville, Essonne
