= Gottschelia =

Scientific classification
- Kingdom: Plantae
- Division: Marchantiophyta
- Class: Jungermanniopsida
- Order: Lophoziales
- Family: Cephaloziellaceae
- Genus: Gottschelia; Grolle

Genus of liverworts

Gottschelia is a genus of liverworts belonging to the family Cephaloziellaceae.

The genus has cosmopolitan distribution.

The genus name of Gottschelia is in honour of Carl Moritz Gottsche (1808–1892), who was a German physician and bryologist born in Altona.

The genus was circumscribed by Riclef Grolle in J. Hattori Bot. Lab. vol.31 on page 13 in 1968.

== Species ==
As accepted by GBIF and World Flora Online;

- Gottschelia crenata Grolle
- Gottschelia grollei D.G.Long & Váňa
- Gottschelia maxima (Steph.) Grolle
- Gottschelia patoniae Grolle, D.B.Schill & D.G.Long
- Gottschelia schizopleura (Spruce) Grolle
