= Kymatocalyx =

Scientific classification
- Kingdom: Plantae
- Division: Marchantiophyta
- Class: Jungermanniopsida
- Order: Lophoziales
- Family: Cephaloziellaceae
- Genus: Kymatocalyx; Herzog

Species
- See text.

Synonyms
- Ruttnerella Schiffn.; Stenorrhipis Herzog

Species of liverworts

Kymatocalyx, synonym Stenorrhipis, is a genus of liverworts in the family Cephaloziellaceae. The genus was first described by Theodore Herzog in 1950. Four species are accepted:

- Kymatocalyx africanus Váňa & M.Wigginton
- Kymatocalyx dominicensis (Spruce) Váňa
- Kymatocalyx madagascariensis (Steph.) Gradst. & Váňa
- Kymatocalyx rhizomaticus (Herzog) Gradst. et Váňa
