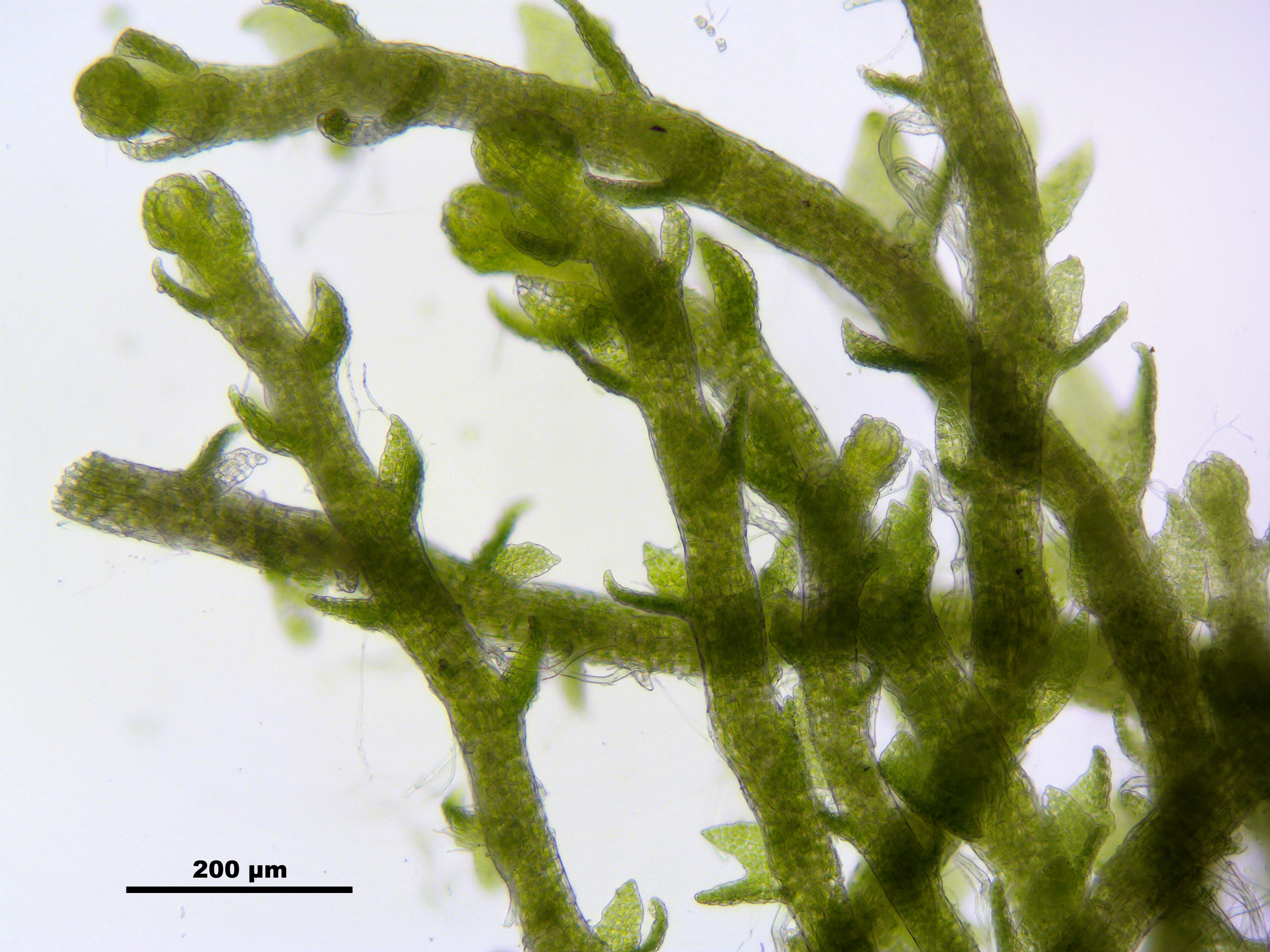
- Cephaloziella divaricata

Scientific classification
- Kingdom: Plantae
- Division: Marchantiophyta
- Class: Jungermanniopsida
- Order: Lophoziales
- Family: Cephaloziellaceae
- Genus: Cephaloziella (Spruce) Schiffn. 1893

Species
- See text

= Cephaloziella =

Genus of liverworts

Cephaloziella is a genus of liverworts. Cephaloziella varians (Gottsche) Steph. is the only liverwort that occurs in the continental Antarctic.

== Species ==
- Cephaloziella acanthophora
- Cephaloziella aenigmatica
- Cephaloziella antillana
- Cephaloziella arctogena
- Cephaloziella arenaria
- Cephaloziella aspericaulis
- Cephaloziella aterrima
- Cephaloziella baumgartneri
- Cephaloziella biloba
- Cephaloziella biokoensis
- Cephaloziella breviperianthia
- Cephaloziella brinkmanii
- Cephaloziella calyculata
- Cephaloziella capensis
- Cephaloziella crassigyna
- Cephaloziella dentata
- Cephaloziella dentifolia
- Cephaloziella divaricata
- Cephaloziella dusenii
- Cephaloziella elachista
- Cephaloziella elegans
- Cephaloziella exigua
- Cephaloziella exiliflora
- Cephaloziella flexuosa
- Cephaloziella fragillima
- Cephaloziella gemmata
- Cephaloziella godajensis
- Cephaloziella gracillima
- Cephaloziella granatensis
- Cephaloziella grandiretis
- Cephaloziella grimsulana
- Cephaloziella grisea
- Cephaloziella hampeana
- Cephaloziella heteroica
- Cephaloziella hirta
- Cephaloziella indica
- Cephaloziella integerrima
- Cephaloziella invisa
- Cephaloziella kiaeri
- Cephaloziella longii
- Cephaloziella magna
- Cephaloziella mamillifera
- Cephaloziella massalongii
- Cephaloziella meghalayensis
- Cephaloziella microphylla
- Cephaloziella minima
- Cephaloziella minutifolia
- Cephaloziella muelleriana
- Cephaloziella natalensis
- Cephaloziella nothogena
- Cephaloziella obcordata
- Cephaloziella obliqua
- Cephaloziella obtusilobula
- Cephaloziella papillosa
- Cephaloziella parvifolia
- Cephaloziella patulifolia
- Cephaloziella pellucida
- Cephaloziella phyllacantha
- Cephaloziella polystratosa
- Cephaloziella pseudocrassigyna
- Cephaloziella pungens
- Cephaloziella rappii
- Cephaloziella recurvifolia
- Cephaloziella rhizantha
- Cephaloziella rubella
- Cephaloziella sinensis
- Cephaloziella spinicaulis
- Cephaloziella spinigera
- Cephaloziella spinophylla
- Cephaloziella squarrosula
- Cephaloziella starkei
- Cephaloziella stellulifera
- Cephaloziella stephanii
- Cephaloziella stolonifera
- Cephaloziella subdentata
- Cephaloziella subtilis
- Cephaloziella tenuissima
- Cephaloziella turneri
- Cephaloziella uncinata
- Cephaloziella varians
- Cephaloziella verrucosa
- Cephaloziella violacea
- Cephaloziella welwitschii
- Cephaloziella willisana
