= Gerhildiella =

Scientific classification
- Kingdom: Plantae
- Division: Marchantiophyta
- Class: Jungermanniopsida
- Order: Lophoziales
- Family: Lophoziaceae
- Genus: Gerhildiella; Grolle
- Species: G. rossneriana

Binomial name
- Gerhildiella rossneriana Grolle

Genus of liverworts

Gerhildiella is a monotypic genus of liverworts in family Lophoziaceae. Its only species is Gerhildiella rossneriana, endemic to Nepal, and genus and species were first described by Riclef Grolle in 1966. The genus name of Gerhildiella is in honour of Gerhild Rossner.
