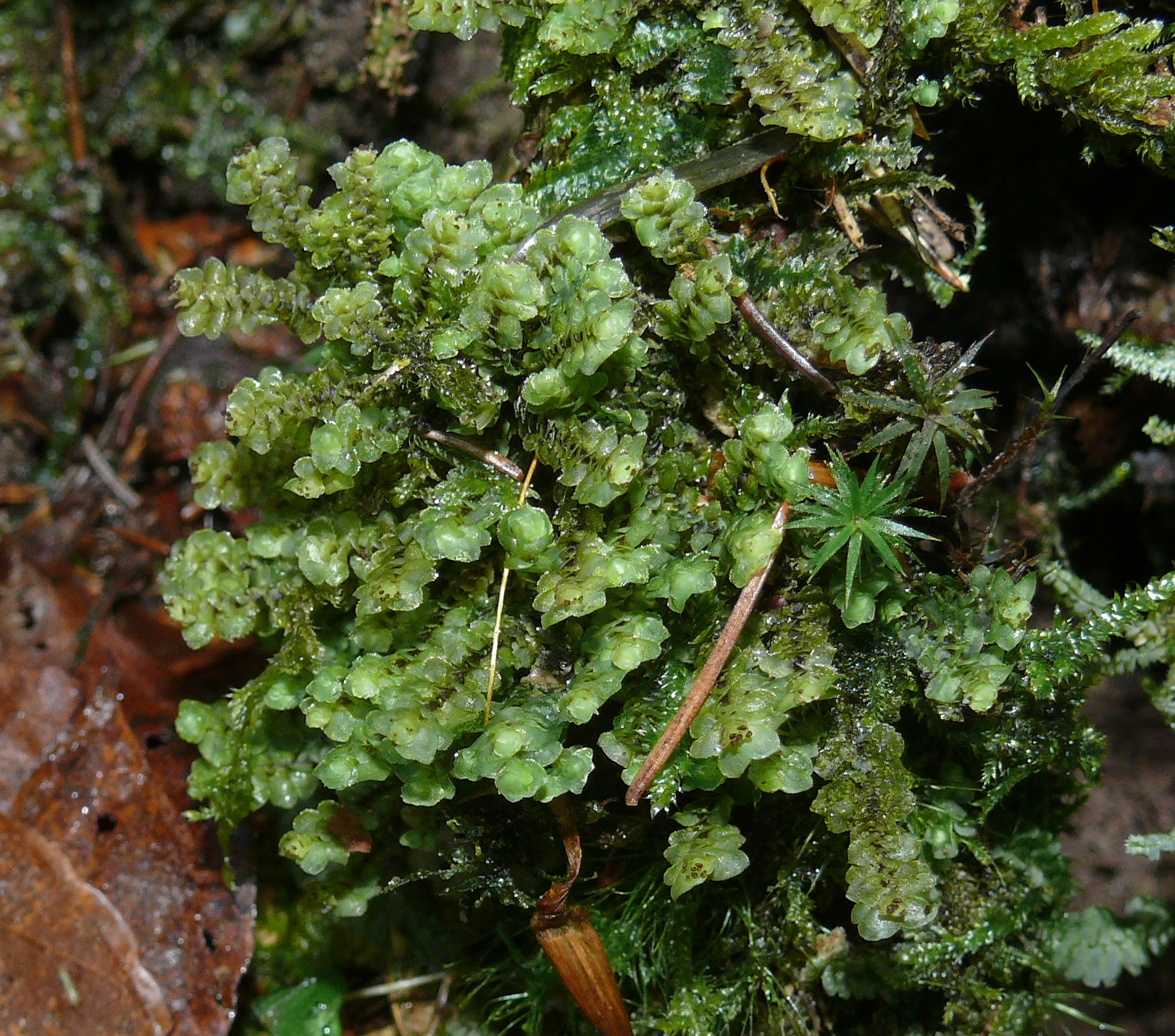
- Scapania nemorea

Scientific classification
- Kingdom: Plantae
- Division: Marchantiophyta
- Class: Jungermanniopsida
- Order: Lophoziales
- Family: Scapaniaceae
- Genus: Scapania (Dumort.) Dumort. nom. cons.

= Scapania =

Genus of liverworts

Scapania is a genus of liverworts in the family Scapaniaceae. It contains the following species (but this list may be incomplete):

- Scapania aequiloba (Schwägr.) Dumort.
- Scapania apiculata Spruce
- Scapania aspera M. Bernet & Bernet
- Scapania brevicaulis Taylor 1846
- Scapania calcicola (Arnell & J. Pers.) Ingham
- Scapania compacta (Roth) Dumort.
- Scapania curta (Mart.) Dumort.
- Scapania cuspiduligera (Nees) Müll.Frib.
- Scapania gracilis Lindb. 1873
- Scapania helvetica Gottsche
- Scapania irrigua (Nees) Nees
- Scapania lingulata H. Buch
- Scapania mucronata H. Buch 1916
- Scapania nemorea (L.) Grolle
- Scapania paludicola Loeske & Müll.Frib.
- Scapania paludosa (Müll.Frib.) Müll.Frib.
- Scapania praetervisa Meyl.
- Scapania sphaerifera, Buch & Tuom.
- Scapania subalpina (Lindenb.) Dumort.
- Scapania uliginosa (Sw. ex Lindenb.) Dumort.
- Scapania umbrosa (Schrad.) Dumort.
- Scapania undulata (L.) Dumort.
