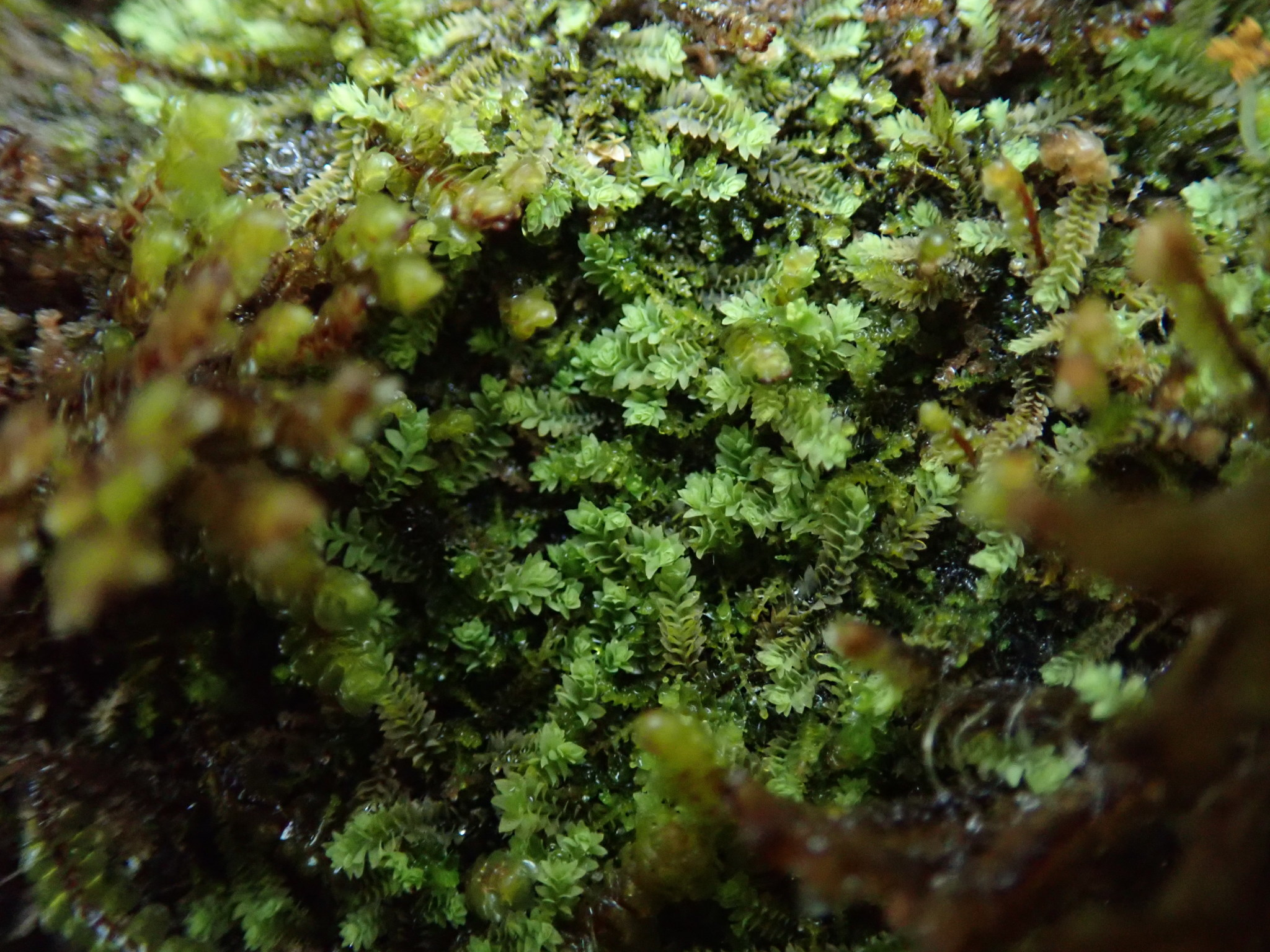

Scientific classification
- Kingdom: Plantae
- Division: Marchantiophyta
- Class: Jungermanniopsida
- Order: Lophoziales
- Family: Scapaniaceae
- Genus: Douinia (C.E.O.Jensen) H.Buch

= Douinia =

Genus of liverworts

Douinia is a genus of liverworts belonging to the family Scapaniaceae.

The species of this genus are found in Eurasia and Northern America.

The genus name of Douinia is in honour of Charles Isidore Douin (1858 – 1944), who was a French bryologist who was a native of Bouville, Eure-et-Loir.

The genus was circumscribed by Christian Erasmus Otterstrøm Jensen in Commentat. Biol. Vol.3 (Issue 1) on page 13 in 1928.

== Species ==
- Douinia imbricata (M.Howe) Konstant. & Vilnet
- Douinia ovata (Dicks.) H.Buch
- Douinia plicata (Lindb.) Konstant. & Vilnet
