= Phycolepidozia =

Scientific classification
- Kingdom: Plantae
- Division: Marchantiophyta
- Class: Jungermanniopsida
- Order: Lophoziales
- Family: Cephaloziellaceae
- Genus: Phycolepidozia; R.M.Schust.

Species
- See text.

Genus of liverworts

Phycolepidozia is a genus of liverwort in the family Cephaloziellaceae. It contains two species:

- Phycolepidozia exigua R.M.Schust.
- Phycolepidozia indica Gradst., J.-P.Frahm & U.Schwarz
