= Tritomaria ferruginea =

Conservation status
- Endangered (IUCN 2.3)

Scientific classification
- Kingdom: Plantae
- Division: Marchantiophyta
- Class: Jungermanniopsida
- Order: Lophoziales
- Family: Lophoziaceae
- Genus: Tritomaria
- Species: T. ferruginea

Binomial name
- Tritomaria ferruginea (Grolle) Váňa

Synonyms
- Andrewsianthus ferrugineus Grolle

Species of liverwort

Tritomaria ferruginea is a species of liverwort in the family Lophoziaceae. It is an endangered species endemic to the eastern Himalayas.

== Taxonomy and history ==
Andrewsianthus ferrugineus was described by Riclef Grolle in 1966 based on a type specimen collected in 1962 by Austrian botanist Josef Poelt from a Rhododendron forest near Ringmo, Nepal. This species was transferred to the genus Tritomaria on the basis of morphological characteristics in 2013, becoming Tritomaria ferruginea.

== Distribution and habitat ==
Endemic to the temperate eastern Himalayas, Tritomaria ferruginea is known from Bhutan, India (Sikkim), and Nepal. In western Bhutan it has been found growing in damp coniferous forests dominated Abies and Juniperus at 3,440 m (11,290 ft) above sea level, while in India it has been found growing in both moorland and on rocky river banks at altitudes of 4,070–4,075 m (13,353–13,369 ft) above sea level. In Nepal it has been found growing in Rhododendron forests and alpine meadows at around 4,000 m (13,000 ft) above sea level, in coniferous forests at 3,610 m (11,840 ft) above sea level, and alongside a rocky stream at 4,020 m (13,190 ft) above sea level.

== Description ==
Tritomaria ferruginea is green to rusty in colour with overlapping, three-lobed leaves that measure 1–2 mm (0.039–0.079 in) wide. The fragile, frequently branched stems are green to yellow-brown and measure up to 2 cm (0.79 in) long. The rhizoids are short and pale. It is a dioicous species, however, mature plants have not been described.

== Ecology ==
Tritomaria ferruginea has been observed as an epiphyte growing on tree trunks (including Juniperus species) and as a lithophyte growing on rocks (including calcareous rocks). It has been found growing among peat and other mosses and alongside Herbertaceae species.

== Conservation status ==
Tritomaria ferruginea is listed as endangered on the International Union for the Conservation of Nature's Red List under criteria B1 and B2cd, based on its small area of occupancy and risk of habitat destruction due to deforestation.
