= Ponometia septuosa =

Scientific classification
- Kingdom: Animalia
- Phylum: Arthropoda
- Clade: Pancrustacea
- Class: Insecta
- Order: Lepidoptera
- Superfamily: Noctuoidea
- Family: Noctuidae
- Genus: Ponometia
- Species: P. septuosa

Binomial name
- Ponometia septuosa (A. Blanchard & Knudson, 1986)

Species of moth

Ponometia septuosa is a species of bird dropping moth in the family Noctuidae. It is found in North America.

The MONA or Hodges number for Ponometia septuosa is 9085.1.
