= Ponometia dorneri =

Scientific classification
- Kingdom: Animalia
- Phylum: Arthropoda
- Clade: Pancrustacea
- Class: Insecta
- Order: Lepidoptera
- Superfamily: Noctuoidea
- Family: Noctuidae
- Genus: Ponometia
- Species: P. dorneri

Binomial name
- Ponometia dorneri (Barnes & McDunnough, 1913)

Species of moth

Ponometia dorneri is a species of bird-dropping moth in the family Noctuidae. It was first described by William Barnes and James Halliday McDunnough in 1913 and it is found in North America.

The MONA or Hodges number for Ponometia dorneri is 9091.
