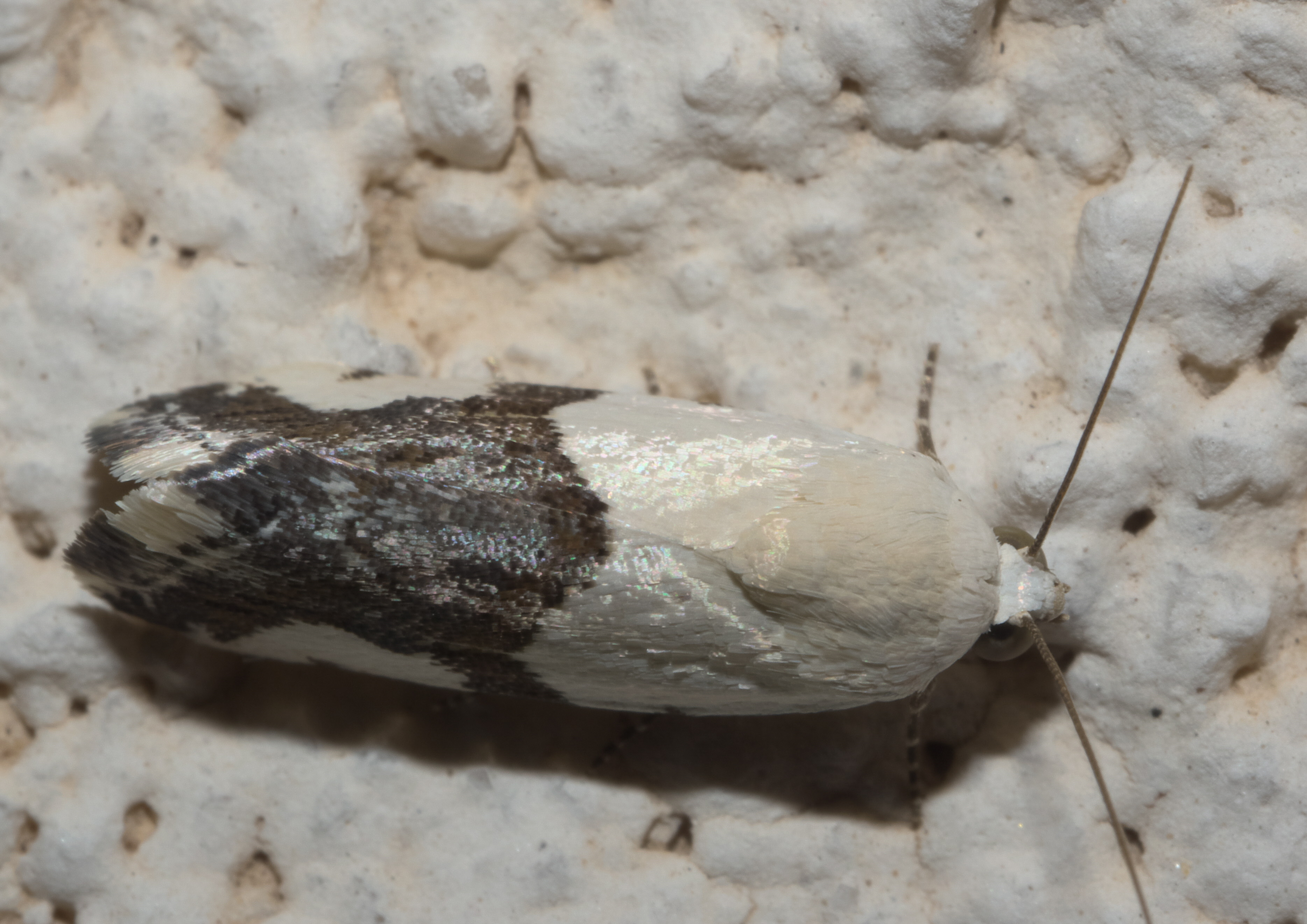

Scientific classification
- Kingdom: Animalia
- Phylum: Arthropoda
- Clade: Pancrustacea
- Class: Insecta
- Order: Lepidoptera
- Superfamily: Noctuoidea
- Family: Noctuidae
- Tribe: Acontiini
- Genus: Ponometia
- Species: P. cuta

Binomial name
- Ponometia cuta (Smith, 1905)

= Ponometia cuta =

Species of moth

Ponometia cuta is a bird dropping moth in the family Noctuidae. The species was first described by Smith in 1905.

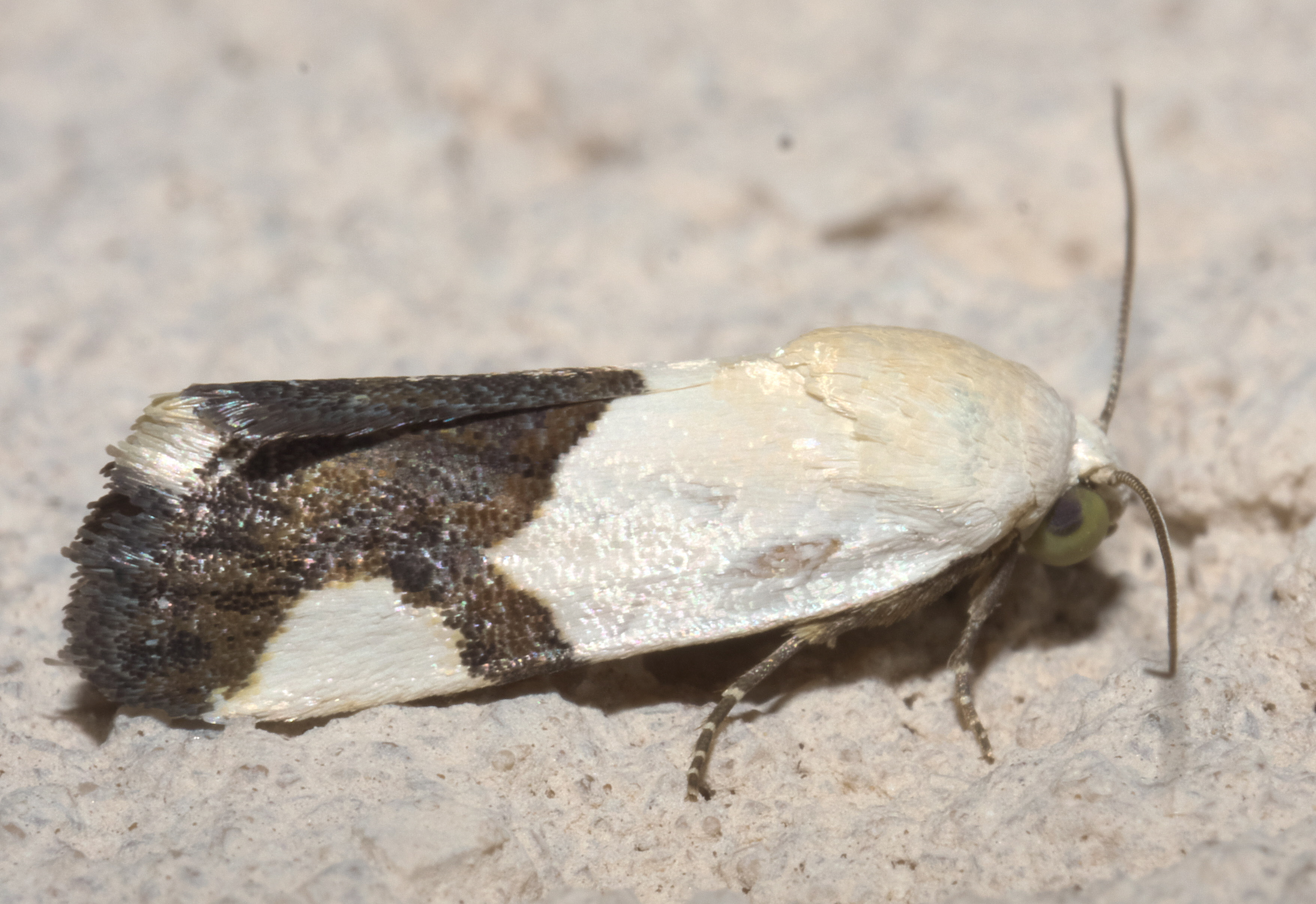
