= Ponometia macdunnoughi =

Scientific classification
- Kingdom: Animalia
- Phylum: Arthropoda
- Clade: Pancrustacea
- Class: Insecta
- Order: Lepidoptera
- Superfamily: Noctuoidea
- Family: Noctuidae
- Genus: Ponometia
- Species: P. macdunnoughi

Binomial name
- Ponometia macdunnoughi (Barnes & Benjamin, 1923)

Species of moth

Ponometia macdunnoughi is a bird-dropping moth in the family Noctuidae first described by William Barnes and Foster Hendrickson Benjamin in 1923. It is found in North America.

The MONA or Hodges number for Ponometia macdunnoughi is 9116.
