= Ponometia hutsoni =

Scientific classification
- Kingdom: Animalia
- Phylum: Arthropoda
- Clade: Pancrustacea
- Class: Insecta
- Order: Lepidoptera
- Superfamily: Noctuoidea
- Family: Noctuidae
- Tribe: Acontiini
- Genus: Ponometia
- Species: P. hutsoni

Binomial name
- Ponometia hutsoni (Smith, 1906)

Species of moth

Ponometia hutsoni is a species of bird dropping moth in the family Noctuidae. It is found in North America.

The MONA or Hodges number for Ponometia hutsoni is 9103.
