= Ponometia pulchra =

Scientific classification
- Kingdom: Animalia
- Phylum: Arthropoda
- Clade: Pancrustacea
- Class: Insecta
- Order: Lepidoptera
- Superfamily: Noctuoidea
- Family: Noctuidae
- Genus: Ponometia
- Species: P. pulchra

Binomial name
- Ponometia pulchra (Barnes & McDunnough, 1910)

Species of moth

Ponometia pulchra is a species of bird-dropping moth in the family Noctuidae. It was first described by William Barnes and James Halliday McDunnough in 1910 and it is found in North America.

The MONA or Hodges number for Ponometia pulchra is 9104.
