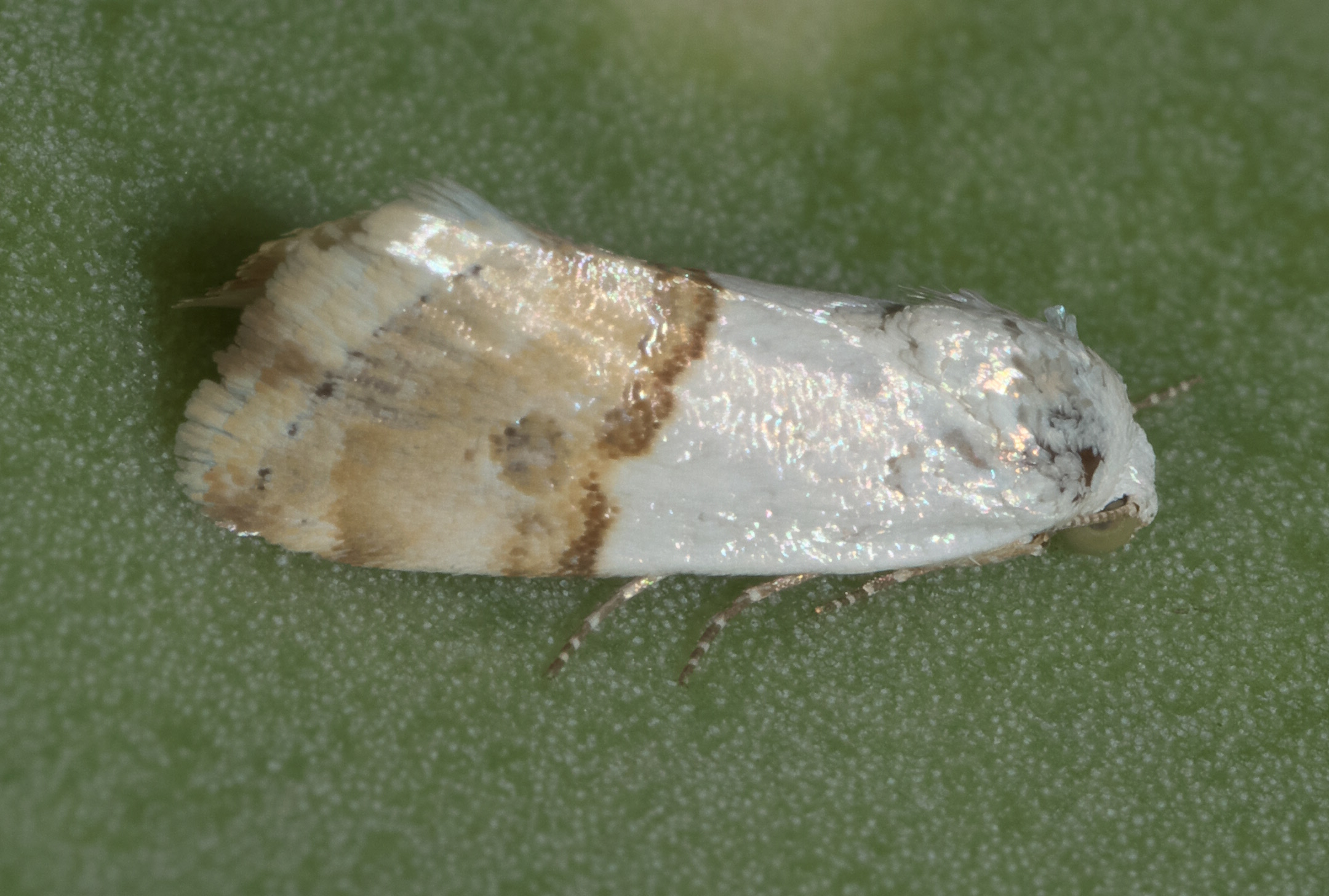

Scientific classification
- Kingdom: Animalia
- Phylum: Arthropoda
- Clade: Pancrustacea
- Class: Insecta
- Order: Lepidoptera
- Superfamily: Noctuoidea
- Family: Noctuidae
- Tribe: Acontiini
- Genus: Ponometia
- Species: P. elegantula

Binomial name
- Ponometia elegantula (Harvey, 1876)

Synonyms
- Ponometia arizonae (H. Edwards, 1878); Ponometia rectangula (McDunnough, 1943)

= Ponometia elegantula =

Species of moth

Ponometia elegantula, the Arizona bird dropping moth, is a species of bird dropping moth in the family Noctuidae. The species was first described by Leon F. Harvey in 1876.

The MONA or Hodges number for Ponometia elegantula is 9109.
