= Ponometia virginalis =

Scientific classification
- Kingdom: Animalia
- Phylum: Arthropoda
- Clade: Pancrustacea
- Class: Insecta
- Order: Lepidoptera
- Superfamily: Noctuoidea
- Family: Noctuidae
- Genus: Ponometia
- Species: P. virginalis

Binomial name
- Ponometia virginalis (Grote, 1881)

Synonyms
- Tarache binocula var. virginalis Grote, 1881; Acontia tenuescens Smith, 1902

Species of moth

Ponometia virginalis is a species of bird dropping moth in the family Noctuidae. It is found in North America, where it has been recorded from eastern Texas to Nebraska, west to eastern Arizona in the south, and to Utah, Colorado, and Wyoming in the west.

The length of the forewings is about 10 mm.

The MONA or Hodges number for Ponometia virginalis is 9088.
