= Ponometia heonyx =

Scientific classification
- Kingdom: Animalia
- Phylum: Arthropoda
- Clade: Pancrustacea
- Class: Insecta
- Order: Lepidoptera
- Superfamily: Noctuoidea
- Family: Noctuidae
- Genus: Ponometia
- Species: P. heonyx

Binomial name
- Ponometia heonyx (Dyar, 1913)

Species of moth

Ponometia heonyx is a species of bird dropping moth in the family Noctuidae.
