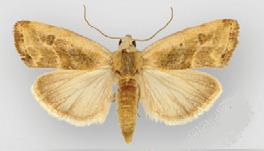

Scientific classification
- Kingdom: Animalia
- Phylum: Arthropoda
- Clade: Pancrustacea
- Class: Insecta
- Order: Lepidoptera
- Superfamily: Noctuoidea
- Family: Noctuidae
- Genus: Ponometia
- Species: P. fasciatella

Binomial name
- Ponometia fasciatella (Grote, 1875)

Synonyms
- Fruva fasciatella (Grote, 1875); Spragueia fasciatella Grote, 1875

= Ponometia fasciatella =

Species of moth

Ponometia fasciatella is a moth of the family Noctuidae. It is found from South Carolina, south to Florida, west to Texas.

The wingspan is about 17 mm.
