= Ponometia bicolorata =

Scientific classification
- Kingdom: Animalia
- Phylum: Arthropoda
- Clade: Pancrustacea
- Class: Insecta
- Order: Lepidoptera
- Superfamily: Noctuoidea
- Family: Noctuidae
- Genus: Ponometia
- Species: P. bicolorata

Binomial name
- Ponometia bicolorata (Barnes & McDunnough, 1912)

Species of moth

Ponometia bicolorata is a species of bird-dropping moth in the family Noctuidae. It was first described by William Barnes and James Halliday McDunnough in 1912 and it is found in North America.

The MONA or Hodges number for Ponometia bicolorata is 9084.
