= Ponometia tortricina =

Scientific classification
- Kingdom: Animalia
- Phylum: Arthropoda
- Clade: Pancrustacea
- Class: Insecta
- Order: Lepidoptera
- Superfamily: Noctuoidea
- Family: Noctuidae
- Genus: Ponometia
- Species: P. tortricina

Binomial name
- Ponometia tortricina (Zeller, 1872)

Species of moth

Ponometia tortricina is a species of bird dropping moth in the family Noctuidae.

The MONA or Hodges number for Ponometia tortricina is 9101.
