= Ponometia phecolisca =

Scientific classification
- Kingdom: Animalia
- Phylum: Arthropoda
- Clade: Pancrustacea
- Class: Insecta
- Order: Lepidoptera
- Superfamily: Noctuoidea
- Family: Noctuidae
- Tribe: Acontiini
- Genus: Ponometia
- Species: P. phecolisca

Binomial name
- Ponometia phecolisca (Druce, 1889)

Species of moth

Ponometia phecolisca is a species of bird dropping moth in the family Noctuidae. It is found in North America.

The MONA or Hodges number for Ponometia phecolisca is 9098.
