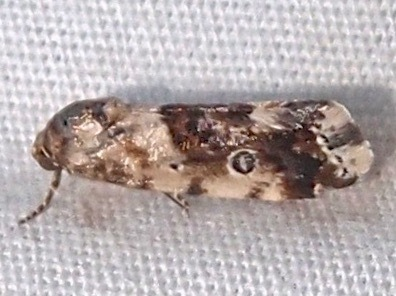
- In Mexico

Scientific classification
- Kingdom: Animalia
- Phylum: Arthropoda
- Clade: Pancrustacea
- Class: Insecta
- Order: Lepidoptera
- Superfamily: Noctuoidea
- Family: Noctuidae
- Tribe: Acontiini
- Genus: Ponometia
- Species: P. nannodes

Binomial name
- Ponometia nannodes (Hampson, 1910)

= Ponometia nannodes =

Species of moth

Ponometia nannodes is a species of bird dropping moth in the family Noctuidae.
