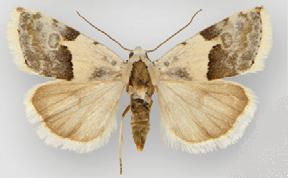
- Ponometia altera

Scientific classification
- Domain: Eukaryota
- Kingdom: Animalia
- Phylum: Arthropoda
- Class: Insecta
- Order: Lepidoptera
- Superfamily: Noctuoidea
- Family: Noctuidae
- Subfamily: Acontiinae
- Tribe: Acontiini
- Genus: Ponometia; Herrich-Schäffer, 1868

Synonyms
- Conochares Smith, 1905; Fruva Grote, 1877; Graeperia Grote, 1895; Heliodora Neumoegen, 1891; Neptunia Barnes & McDunnough, 1911; Tarachidia Hampson, 1898; Tornacontia Smith, 1900; Uniptena Nye, 1975

= Ponometia =

Genus of moths

Ponometia is a genus of moths of the family Noctuidae. The genus was erected by Gottlieb August Wilhelm Herrich-Schäffer in 1868.

The Global Lepidoptera Names Index gives this name as a synonym of Acontia.

== Species ==
- Ponometia exigua Fabricius, 1793
- Ponometia macdunnoughi Barnes & Benjamin, 1923 (alternative spelling Ponometia mcdunnoughi)
- Ponometia megocula Smith, 1900
- Ponometia sutrix Grote, 1880
- Ponometia tripartita Smith, 1903

== Formerly Conochares ==
- Ponometia acutus Smith, 1905 (syn: Ponometia catalina Smith, 1906)
- Ponometia altera Smith, 1903
- Ponometia elegantula Harvey, 1876 (syn: Ponometia arizonae H. Edwards, 1878, Ponometia rectangula McDunnough, 1943)

== Formerly Fruva ==
- Ponometia fasciatella Grote, 1875
- Ponometia hutsoni Smith, 1906
- Ponometia pulchra Barnes & McDunnough, 1910
- Ponometia vinculis Dyar, 1914

== Formerly Tarachidia ==
- Ponometia alata Smith, 1905
- Ponometia albimargo Barnes & McDunnough, 1916
- Ponometia albisecta Hampson, 1910
- Ponometia albitermen Barnes & McDunnough, 1916
- Ponometia bicolorata (Barnes & McDunnough, 1912)
- Ponometia binocula Grote, 1875
- Ponometia bruchi Breyer, 1931
- Ponometia candefacta Hübner, [1831]
- Ponometia carmelita Dyar, 1914
- Ponometia clausula Grote, 1882
- Ponometia corrientes Hampson, 1910
- Ponometia cuta Smith, 1905
- Ponometia dorneri Barnes & McDunnough, 1913
- Ponometia erastrioides Guenée, 1852
- Ponometia flavibasis (Hampson, 1898)
- Ponometia fumata (Smith, 1905)
- Ponometia heonyx Dyar, 1913
- Ponometia huita Smith, 1903
- Ponometia libedis Smith, 1900
- Ponometia margarita Schaus, 1904
- Ponometia marginata Köhler, 1979
- Ponometia mixta Möschler, 1890
- Ponometia morsa Köhler, 1979
- Ponometia nannodes Hampson, 1910
- Ponometia nigra (Mustelin, 2006)
- Ponometia nigrans Köhler, 1979
- Ponometia parvula Walker, 1865
- Ponometia phecolisca H. Druce, 1889
- Ponometia semibrunnea H. Druce, 1909
- Ponometia semiflava Guenée, 1852
- Ponometia septuosa Blanchard & Knudson, 1986
- Ponometia tortricina Zeller, 1872
- Ponometia venustula Walker, 1865
- Ponometia virginalis Grote, 1881
- Ponometia viridans Smith, 1904
