= Ponometia tripartita =

Scientific classification
- Kingdom: Animalia
- Phylum: Arthropoda
- Clade: Pancrustacea
- Class: Insecta
- Order: Lepidoptera
- Superfamily: Noctuoidea
- Family: Noctuidae
- Tribe: Acontiini
- Genus: Ponometia
- Species: P. tripartita

Binomial name
- Ponometia tripartita (Smith, 1903)

Species of moth

Ponometia tripartita is a species of bird dropping moth in the family Noctuidae. It is found in North America.

The MONA or Hodges number for Ponometia tripartita is 9118.
