= Hampus Wilhelm Arnell =

Swedish bryologist

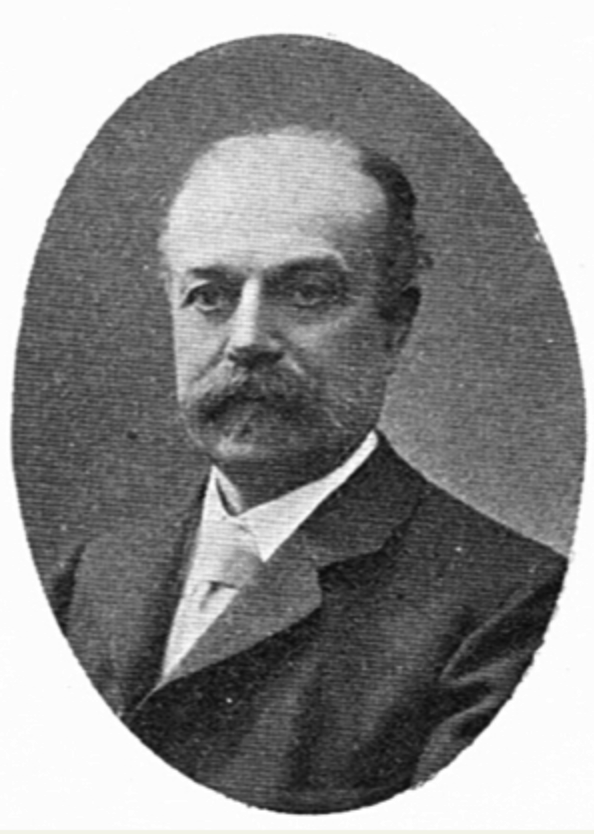
- Born: Hampus Wilhelm Arnell; August 2, 1848; Härnösand
- Died: Uppsala
- Education: University of Uppsala
- Known for: Studies of bryophytes, phenological research
- Children: Sigfrid Vilhelm Arnell
- Scientific career
- Fields: Bryology, Botany, Chemistry, Natural history
- Workplaces: University of Uppsala, Schools in Umeå, Harnosand, Jönköping, Gävle, Uppsala
- Notable students: Sigfrid Vilhelm Arnell
- Author abbrev. (botany): H.W.Arnell

Hampus Wilhelm Arnell (2 August 1848 in Härnösand – 1932 in Uppsala) was a Swedish bryologist. He was the father of hepaticologist Sigfrid Vilhelm Arnell (1895–1970).

In 1875, he became a privat-docent of botany at the University of Uppsala, later working as a schoolteacher in Umeå and Harnosand. In 1880 he became an associate professor of natural history and chemistry in Jönköping. He later taught classes in Gävle (from 1894) and Uppsala (from 1901).

His botanical studies included trips throughout most of Sweden, to northern Norway (1869, 1870 and 1891) and to the lower Yenisei valley in Siberia (1876). From 1873 onward, he performed phenological research in various parts of Sweden.

The liverwort genera Arnellia Lindb. and Arnelliella C. Massal. commemorate his name.

== Selected works ==
- De skandinaviska löfmossornas kalendarium, 1875.
- Om vegetationes utveckling i Sverige åren 1873-75, 1878.
- Lebermoosstudien im nördlichen Norwegen, 1892.
- Die Moose des Sarekgebietes, 1907.
- Vegetationens årliga utvecklingsgång i Svealand, 1923.
- Mossor : a. levermossor, 1928.
