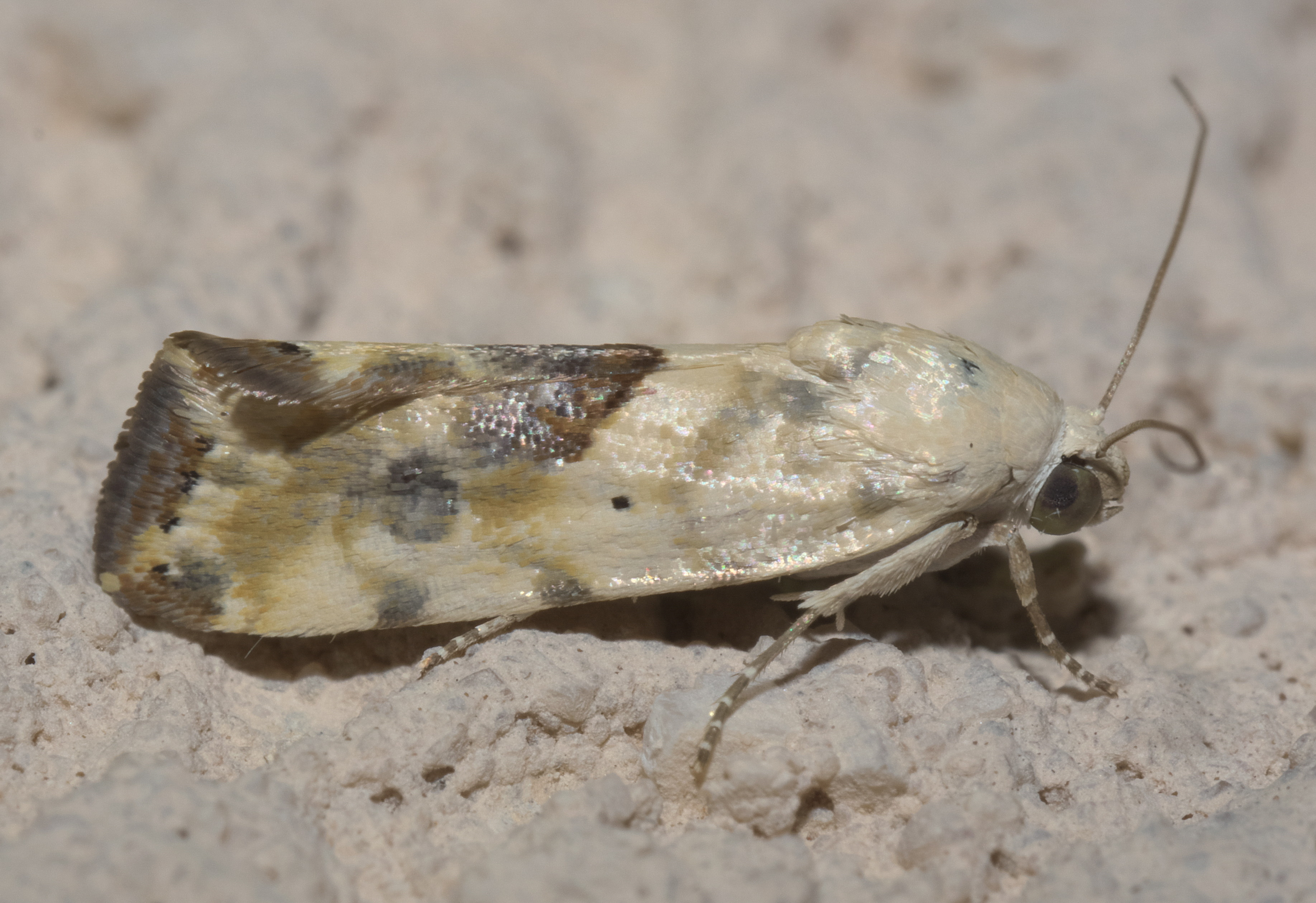

Scientific classification
- Kingdom: Animalia
- Phylum: Arthropoda
- Clade: Pancrustacea
- Class: Insecta
- Order: Lepidoptera
- Superfamily: Noctuoidea
- Family: Noctuidae
- Tribe: Acontiini
- Genus: Ponometia
- Species: P. libedis

Binomial name
- Ponometia libedis (Smith, 1900)

= Ponometia libedis =

Species of moth

Ponometia libedis is a bird dropping moth in the family Noctuidae. The species was first described by Smith in 1900.

The MONA or Hodges number for Ponometia libedis is 9096.

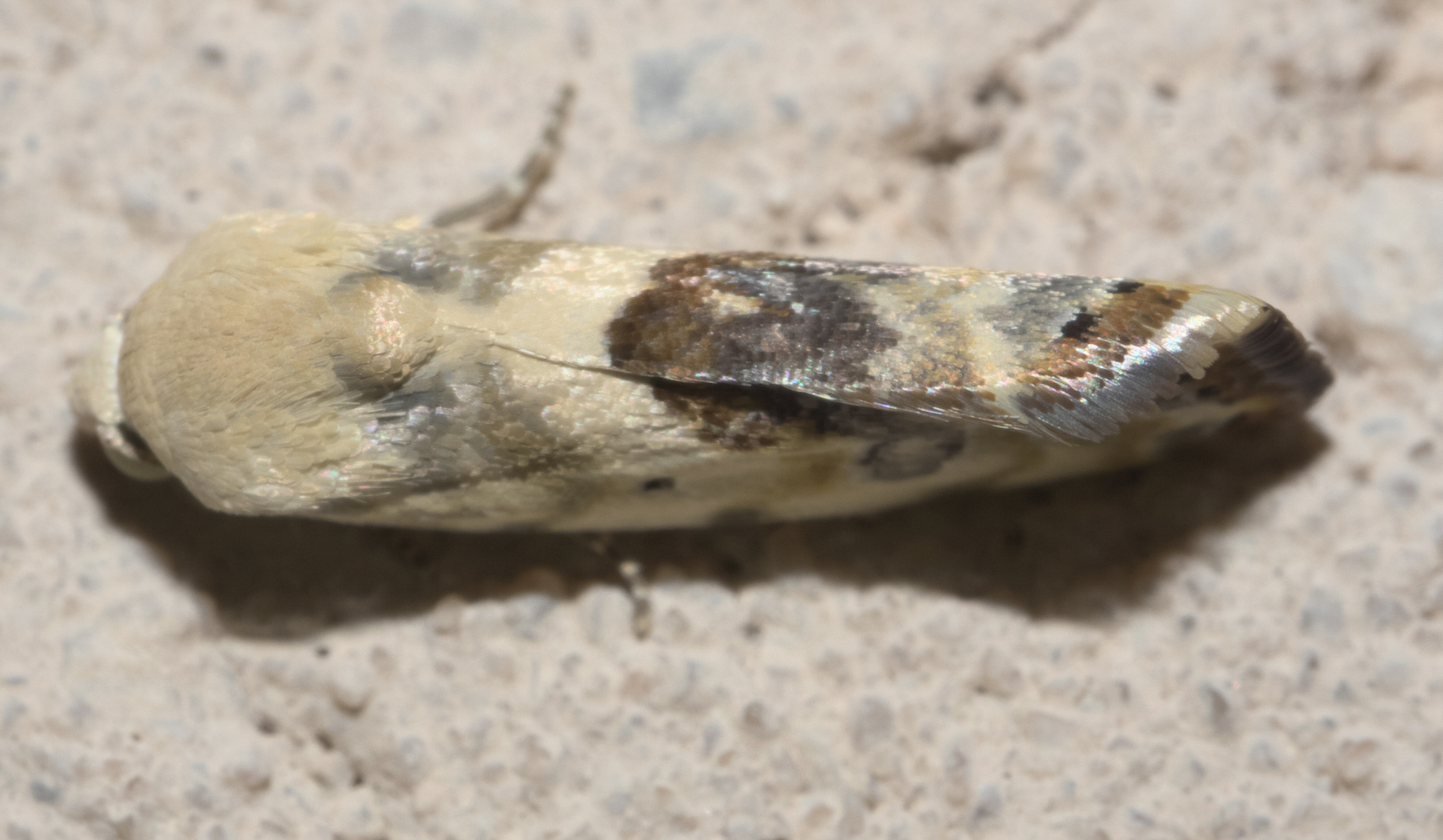
