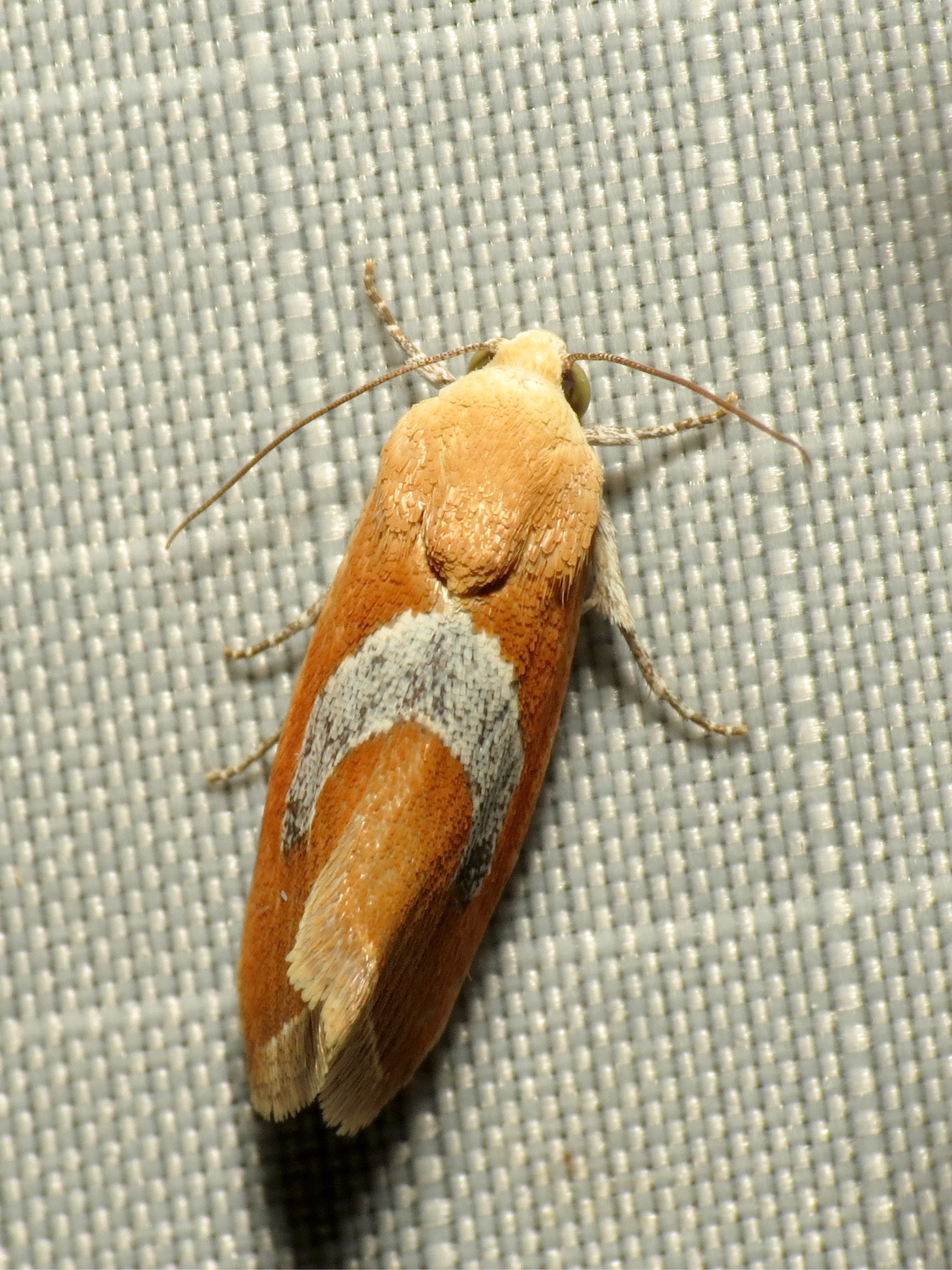

Scientific classification
- Kingdom: Animalia
- Phylum: Arthropoda
- Clade: Pancrustacea
- Class: Insecta
- Order: Lepidoptera
- Superfamily: Noctuoidea
- Family: Noctuidae
- Tribe: Acontiini
- Genus: Ponometia
- Species: P. venustula

Binomial name
- Ponometia venustula (Walker, 1865)

= Ponometia venustula =

Species of moth

Ponometia venustula is a species of bird dropping moth in the family Noctuidae first described by Francis Walker in 1865.
