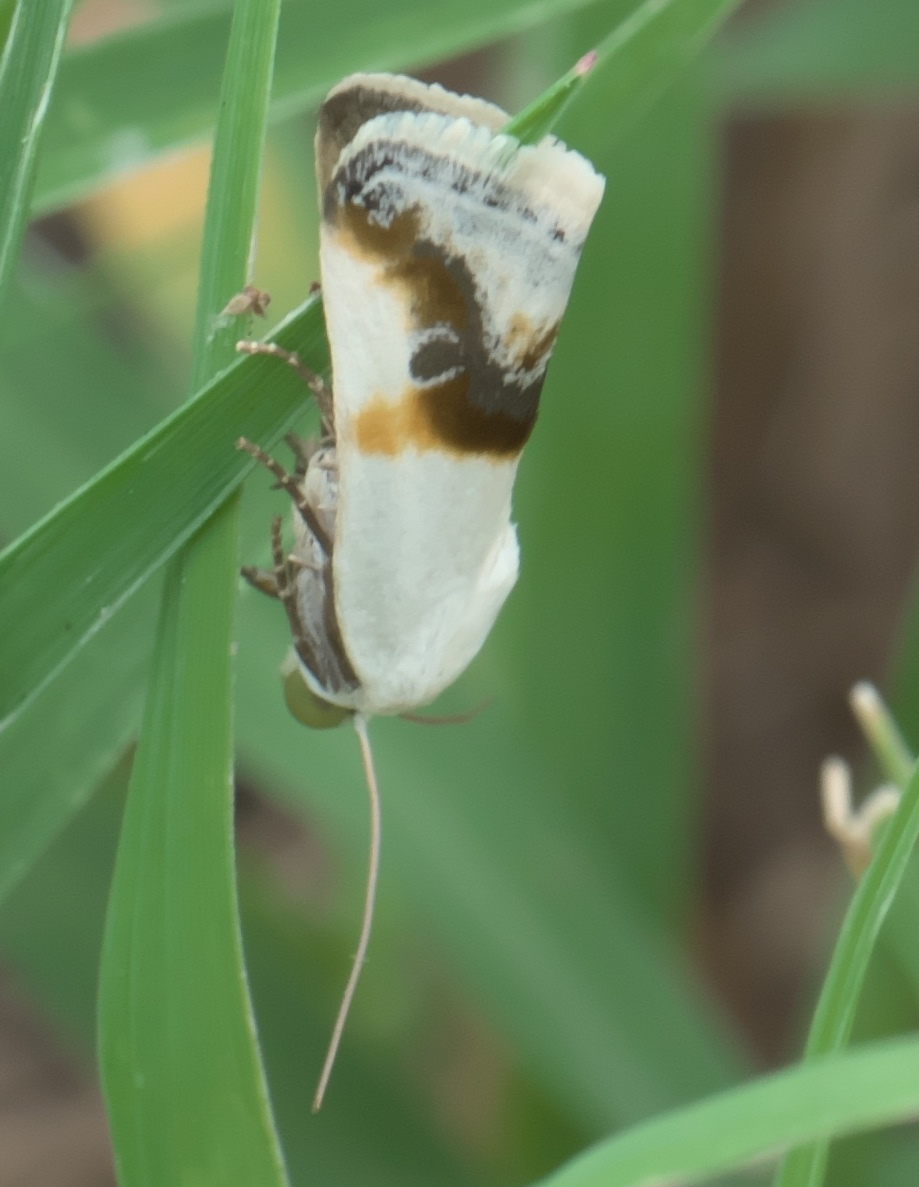

Scientific classification
- Kingdom: Animalia
- Phylum: Arthropoda
- Clade: Pancrustacea
- Class: Insecta
- Order: Lepidoptera
- Superfamily: Noctuoidea
- Family: Noctuidae
- Genus: Ponometia
- Species: P. binocula

Binomial name
- Ponometia binocula (Grote, 1875)

= Ponometia binocula =

Species of moth

Ponometia binocula, the prairie bird-dropping moth, is a bird dropping moth in the family Noctuidae. The species was first described by Augustus Radcliffe Grote in 1875.

The MONA or Hodges number for Ponometia binocula is 9089.
