= Ponometia alata =

Scientific classification
- Kingdom: Animalia
- Phylum: Arthropoda
- Clade: Pancrustacea
- Class: Insecta
- Order: Lepidoptera
- Superfamily: Noctuoidea
- Family: Noctuidae
- Tribe: Acontiini
- Genus: Ponometia
- Species: P. alata

Binomial name
- Ponometia alata (Smith, 1905)

Species of moth

Ponometia alata is a species of bird dropping moth in the family Noctuidae.

The MONA or Hodges number for Ponometia alata is 9099.
