= Ponometia acutus =

Scientific classification
- Kingdom: Animalia
- Phylum: Arthropoda
- Clade: Pancrustacea
- Class: Insecta
- Order: Lepidoptera
- Superfamily: Noctuoidea
- Family: Noctuidae
- Tribe: Acontiini
- Genus: Ponometia
- Species: P. acutus

Binomial name
- Ponometia acutus (Smith, 1905)

Synonyms
- Ponometia catalina (Smith, 1906)

Species of moth

Ponometia acutus is a species of bird dropping moth in the family Noctuidae.

The MONA or Hodges number for Ponometia acutus is 9105.
