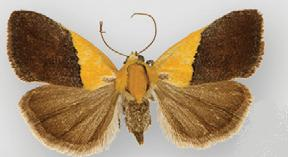

Scientific classification
- Kingdom: Animalia
- Phylum: Arthropoda
- Clade: Pancrustacea
- Class: Insecta
- Order: Lepidoptera
- Superfamily: Noctuoidea
- Family: Noctuidae
- Genus: Ponometia
- Species: P. semiflava

Binomial name
- Ponometia semiflava (Guenée, 1852)

Synonyms
- Xanthoptera semiflava Guenée, 1852; Tarachidia semiflava (Guenée, 1852)

= Ponometia semiflava =

Species of moth

Ponometia semiflava, the half-yellow or yellow-cloaked midget, is a moth of the family Noctuidae. The species was first described by Achille Guenée in 1852. It is found in North America from New York and New England to Florida, west to Arizona, north to British Columbia and Manitoba.

The habitat consists of dry open areas such as sandy prairie, old beaches and dunes.

The wingspan is 14–24 mm. Adults are nocturnal and are on wing from March to August in the south and June to July in the north. There is one generation per year.

The larvae have been recorded on Sarracenia flava, but this is probably a misidentification.
