= Puya exigua =

Conservation status
- Endangered (IUCN 3.1)

Scientific classification
- Kingdom: Plantae
- Clade: Embryophytes
- Clade: Tracheophytes
- Clade: Spermatophytes
- Clade: Angiosperms
- Clade: Monocots
- Clade: Commelinids
- Order: Poales
- Family: Bromeliaceae
- Genus: Puya
- Species: P. exigua

Binomial name
- Puya exigua Mez

Species of flowering plant

Puya exigua is a species of flowering plant in the family Bromeliaceae. It is endemic to Ecuador. Its natural habitat is subtropical or tropical high-altitude grassland. It is threatened by habitat loss.
