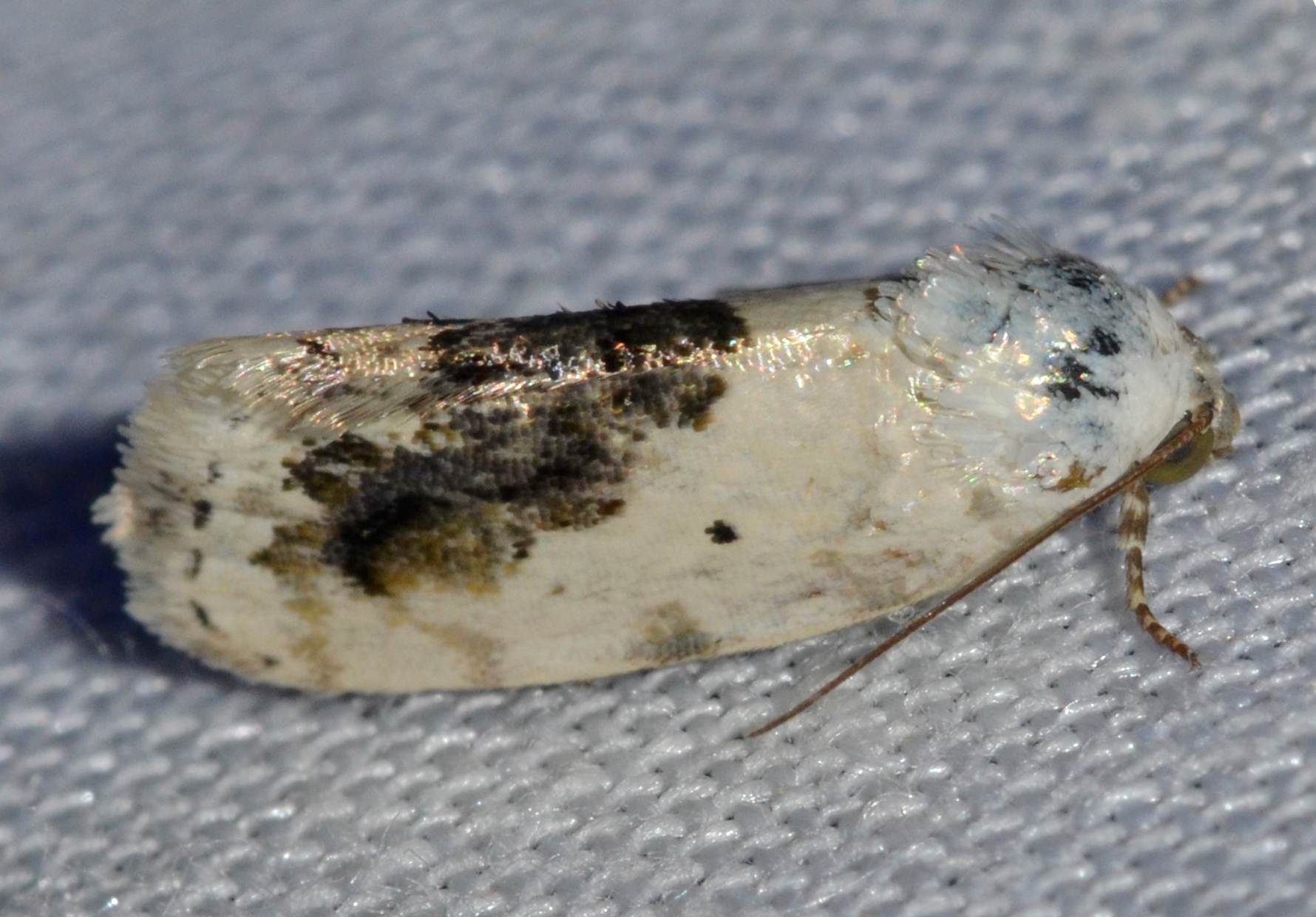

Scientific classification
- Kingdom: Animalia
- Phylum: Arthropoda
- Clade: Pancrustacea
- Class: Insecta
- Order: Lepidoptera
- Superfamily: Noctuoidea
- Family: Noctuidae
- Genus: Ponometia
- Species: P. erastrioides

Binomial name
- Ponometia erastrioides (Guenée, 1852)

Synonyms
- Acontia erastrioides Guenée, 1852; Tarachidia erastrioides

= Ponometia erastrioides =

Species of moth

Ponometia erastrioides, the small bird-dropping moth or small bird lime moth, is a moth of the family Noctuidae. It is found in North America, where it has been recorded from the eastern United States and south-central Canada (Quebec, Ontario, Saskatchewan). The habitat consists of fields, waste places and riparian areas.

The wingspan is 16–20 mm. Adults are on wing from May to September.

The larvae feed on Ambrosia species. Full-grown larvae reach a length of 25 mm.
