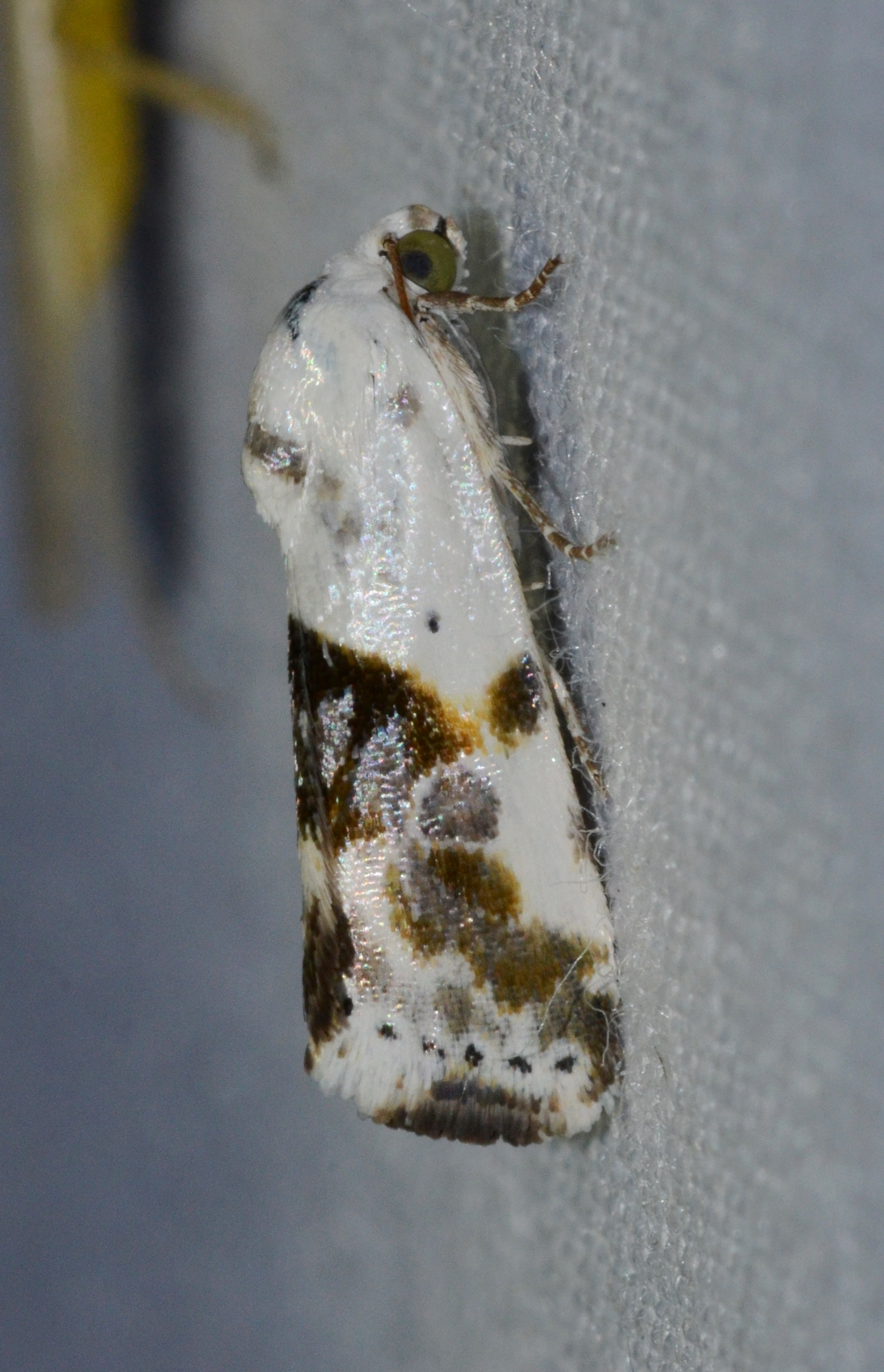

Scientific classification
- Kingdom: Animalia
- Phylum: Arthropoda
- Clade: Pancrustacea
- Class: Insecta
- Order: Lepidoptera
- Superfamily: Noctuoidea
- Family: Noctuidae
- Genus: Ponometia
- Species: P. candefacta

Binomial name
- Ponometia candefacta (Hübner, [1831])

Synonyms
- Tarache candefacta Hübner, [1831]; Tarachidia candefacta; Micra haworthana Westwood, 1851; Acontia debilis Walker, [1858]; Acontia neomexicana Smith, 1900; Tarachidia candefactella Strand, 1916

= Ponometia candefacta =

Species of moth

Ponometia candefacta, the olive-shaded bird-dropping moth, is a moth of the family Noctuidae. It is found in North America, where it has been recorded from the northern United States to southern Mexico. It has been introduced to Russia as a biological control agent of Ambrosia artemisiifolia. The habitat consists of dry, weedy, disturbed areas at low elevations.

The wingspan is 18–22 mm. Adults are on wing in summer, from April to September.

The larvae feed on Asteraceae, including Aster and Ambrosia species. They are green with a white lateral stripe.
