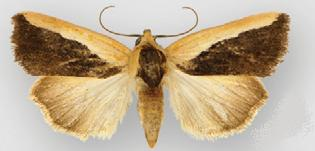

Scientific classification
- Kingdom: Animalia
- Phylum: Arthropoda
- Clade: Pancrustacea
- Class: Insecta
- Order: Lepidoptera
- Superfamily: Noctuoidea
- Family: Noctuidae
- Genus: Ponometia
- Species: P. exigua

Binomial name
- Ponometia exigua (Fabricius, 1793)

Synonyms
- Bombyx exigua Fabricius, 1793; Nonagria indubitans Walker, 1857; Acontia costalis Walker, [1858]; Acontia dimidiata Walker, 1865; Ponometia ochricosta Herrich-Schäffer, 1868; Monodes citrina Druce, 1889; Heliodora magnifica Neumoegen, 1891

= Ponometia exigua =

Species of moth

Ponometia exigua is a moth of the family Noctuidae first described by Johan Christian Fabricius in 1793. It is found from Georgia, south to Florida and west to Texas. Outside of the United States it is found in Jamaica, Cuba, Hispaniola, the Virgin Islands and Central America and South America down to Brazil.

It is a sexually dimorphic species.

The larvae feed on Erechtites hieraciifolia and Waltheria ovata.
