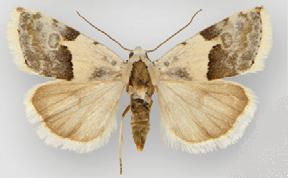

Scientific classification
- Kingdom: Animalia
- Phylum: Arthropoda
- Clade: Pancrustacea
- Class: Insecta
- Order: Lepidoptera
- Superfamily: Noctuoidea
- Family: Noctuidae
- Genus: Ponometia
- Species: P. altera

Binomial name
- Ponometia altera (Smith, 1903)

Synonyms
- Torancontia altera Smith, 1903; Conochares altera (Smith, 1903); Craeperia conocharodes Hampson, 1910

= Ponometia altera =

Species of moth

Ponometia altera is a moth of the family Noctuidae. It is found in the southern parts of the United States, including New Mexico, Arizona and California.

The wingspan is about 21 mm.

The larvae feed on Ericameria species.
