= Sigfrid Vilhelm Arnell =

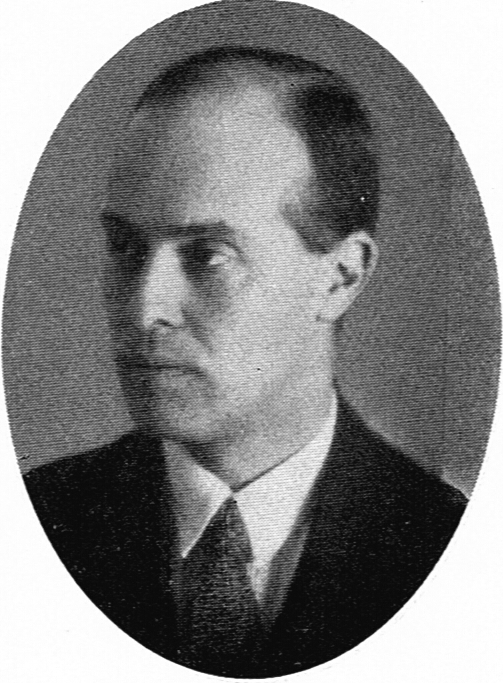

Sigfrid Vilhelm Arnell, also sometimes Sigfrid Wilhelm Arnell (1895 in Gävle – 1970), was a Swedish medical practitioner and hepaticologist. He was the son of bryologist Hampus Wilhelm Arnell (1848–1932).

After finishing his education in Uppsala and Stockholm, he worked at the hospital in Gävle, where he was director of its roentgenological department from 1927 up until retirement in 1960. Following retirement he resided in Bromma, and in 1963, relocated to Uppsala. In his later years, he suffered from Parkinson's disease and was plagued by failing eyesight.

In 1951 he was made an honorary member of the British Bryological Society. As a botanical collector, his travels included trips to Spitsbergen (1956), the Canary Islands (1958, 1959), northern Sweden (1960) and Egypt (1961). He was the author of 79 scientific works.

== Works by Arnell that have been published in English ==
- Illustrated moss flora of Fennoscandia, I: Hepataceae, 1956.
- Hepaticae collected by O. Hedberg et al. on the East African Mountains, 1956.
- Hepatics from Tristan da Cunha, 1958.
- A contribution to the knowledge of the bryophyte flora of W. Spitsbergen, and Kongsfjorden (King's Bay, 79°N.) in particular. (with Olle Mårtensson), 1959.
- Hepaticae of South Africa. (National government publication), 1963.
