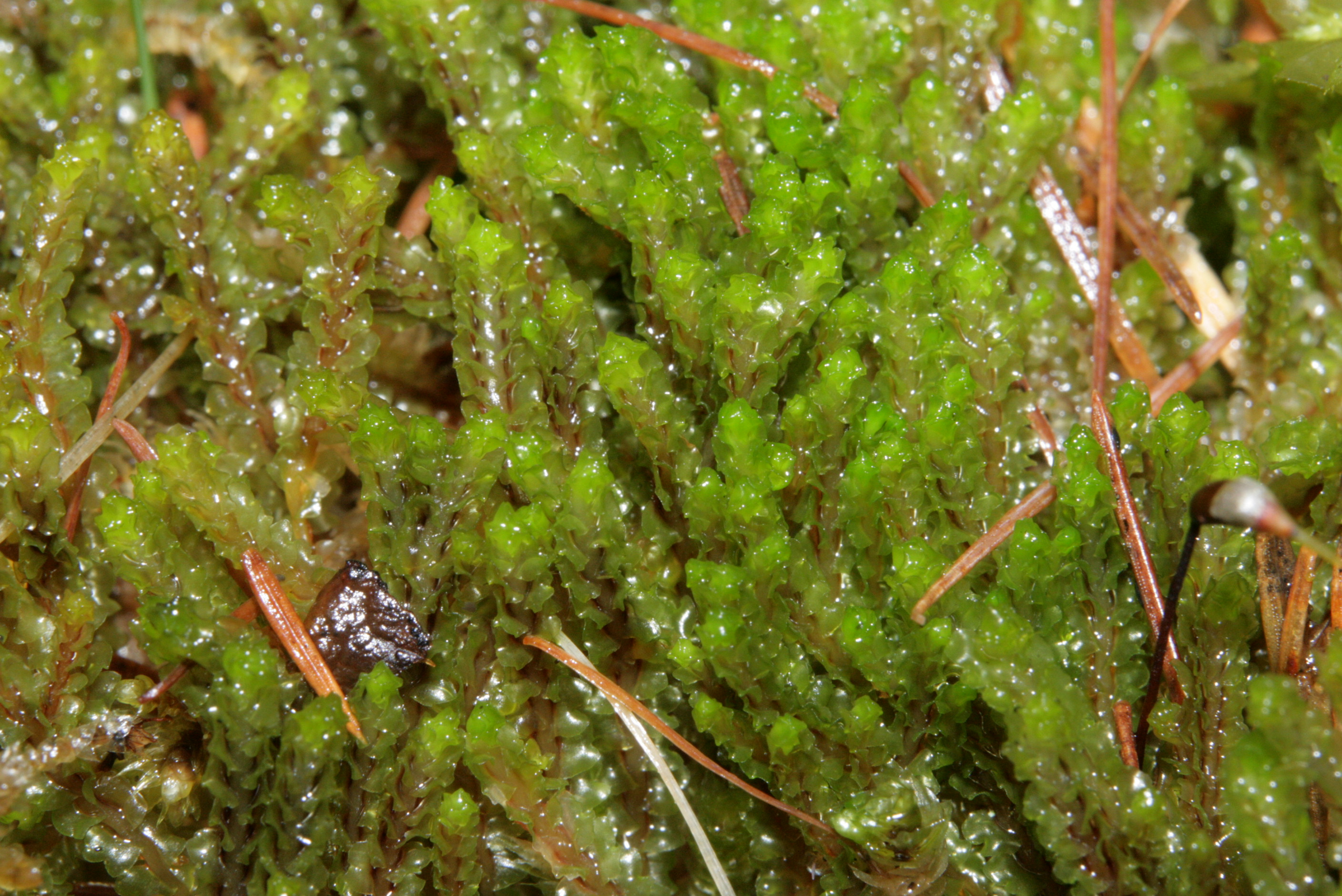
- Lophozia obtusa

Scientific classification
- Kingdom: Plantae
- Division: Marchantiophyta
- Class: Jungermanniopsida
- Order: Lophoziales
- Family: Lophoziaceae; Cavers

= Lophoziaceae =

Family of liverworts

Lophoziaceae is a family of liverworts belonging to the order Jungermanniales.

Included genera:

- Andrewsianthus R.M.Schust.
- Gerhildiella Grolle
- Heterogemma (Jørg.) Konstant. & Vilnet
- Lophozia (Dumort.) Dumort.
- Lophoziopsis Konstant. & Vilnet
- Pseudocephaloziella R.M.Schust.
- Trilophozia (R.M.Schust.) Bakalin
- Tritomaria Schiffn. ex Loeske
