= Bouville, Eure-et-Loir =

Bouville
- Commune
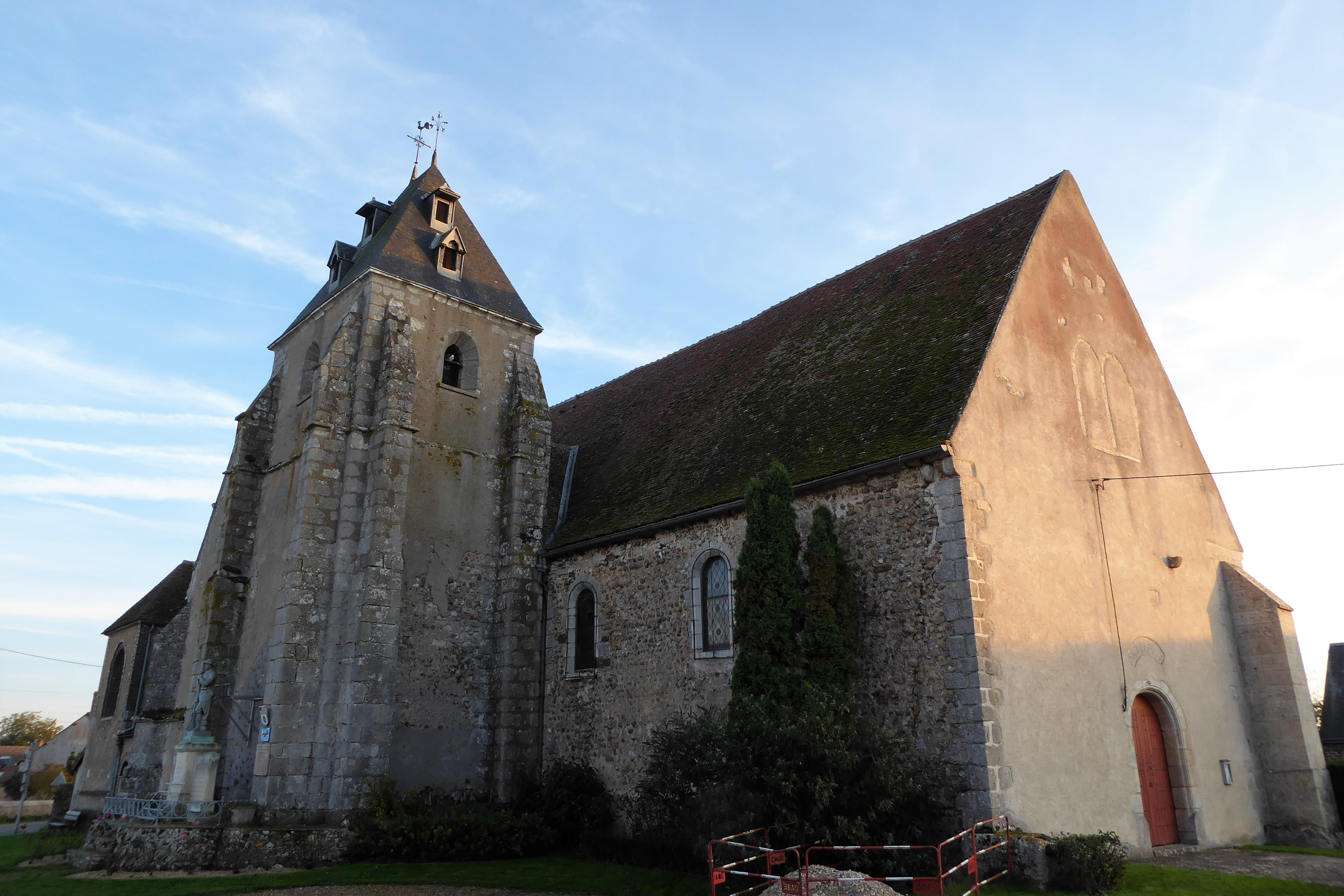
- The church in Bouville
- Location of Bouville
- Location within France Location within Centre-Val de Loire
- Coordinates: 48°15′37″N 1°22′44″E
- Country: France
- Region: Centre-Val de Loire
- Department: Eure-et-Loir
- Arrondissement: Châteaudun
- Canton: Les Villages Vovéens
- Intercommunality: Bonnevalais

Government
  - Mayor (2020–2026): Benoît Geslin
- Area^{1}: 15.65 km^{2} (6.04 sq mi)
- Elevation: 156 m (512 ft)
- Highest elevation: 152 m (499 ft)
- Lowest elevation: 127 m (417 ft)
- Population (2023): 530
  - Density: 34/km^{2} (88/sq mi)
- Time zone: UTC+01:00 (CET)
  - Summer (DST): UTC+02:00 (CEST)
- INSEE/Postal code: 28057 /28800
- ^{1} French Land Register data, which excludes lakes, ponds, glaciers > 1 km^{2} (0.386 sq mi or 247 acres) and river estuaries.

Bouville (French pronunciation: [buvil]) is a commune in the Eure-et-Loir department in northern France.

== Population ==
Historical population
Year	Pop.	±% p.a.
1968	456	—
1975	391	−2.17%
1982	373	−0.67%
1990	386	+0.43%
1999	419	+0.92%
2007	510	+2.49%
2012	565	+2.07%
2017	588	+0.80%
2023	530	−1.72%
Source: INSEE

== See also ==
- Communes of the Eure-et-Loir department
