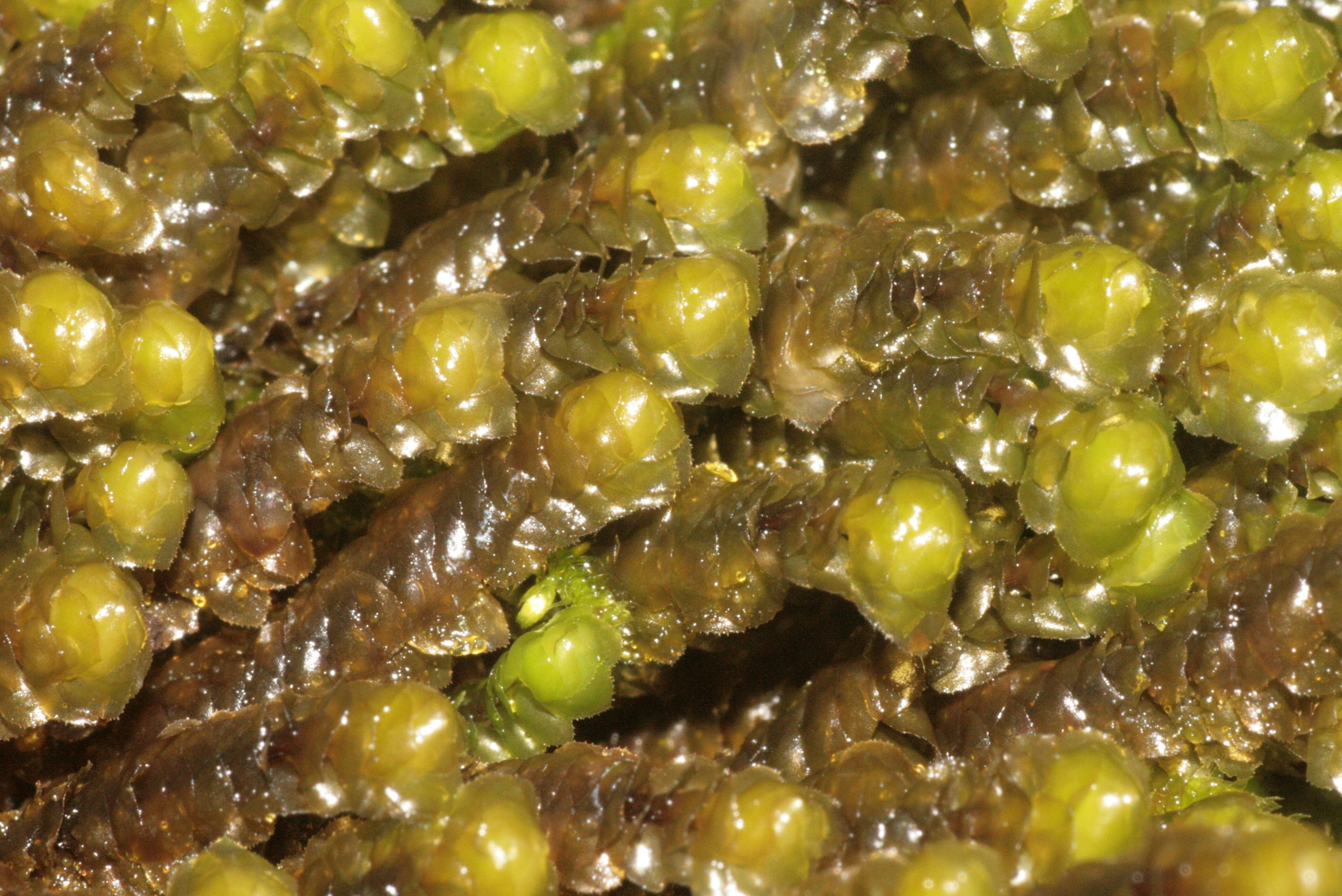
- Scapania aspera

Scientific classification
- Kingdom: Plantae
- Division: Marchantiophyta
- Class: Jungermanniopsida
- Order: Lophoziales
- Family: Scapaniaceae; Mig., 1904

Genera
- Diplophyllum; Douinia; Pseudotritomaria; Saccobasis; Scapania; Schistochilopsis

= Scapaniaceae =

Family of liverworts

Scapaniaceae is a family of liverworts in order Jungermanniales. The family has been extended to include the former family Lophoziaceae.
