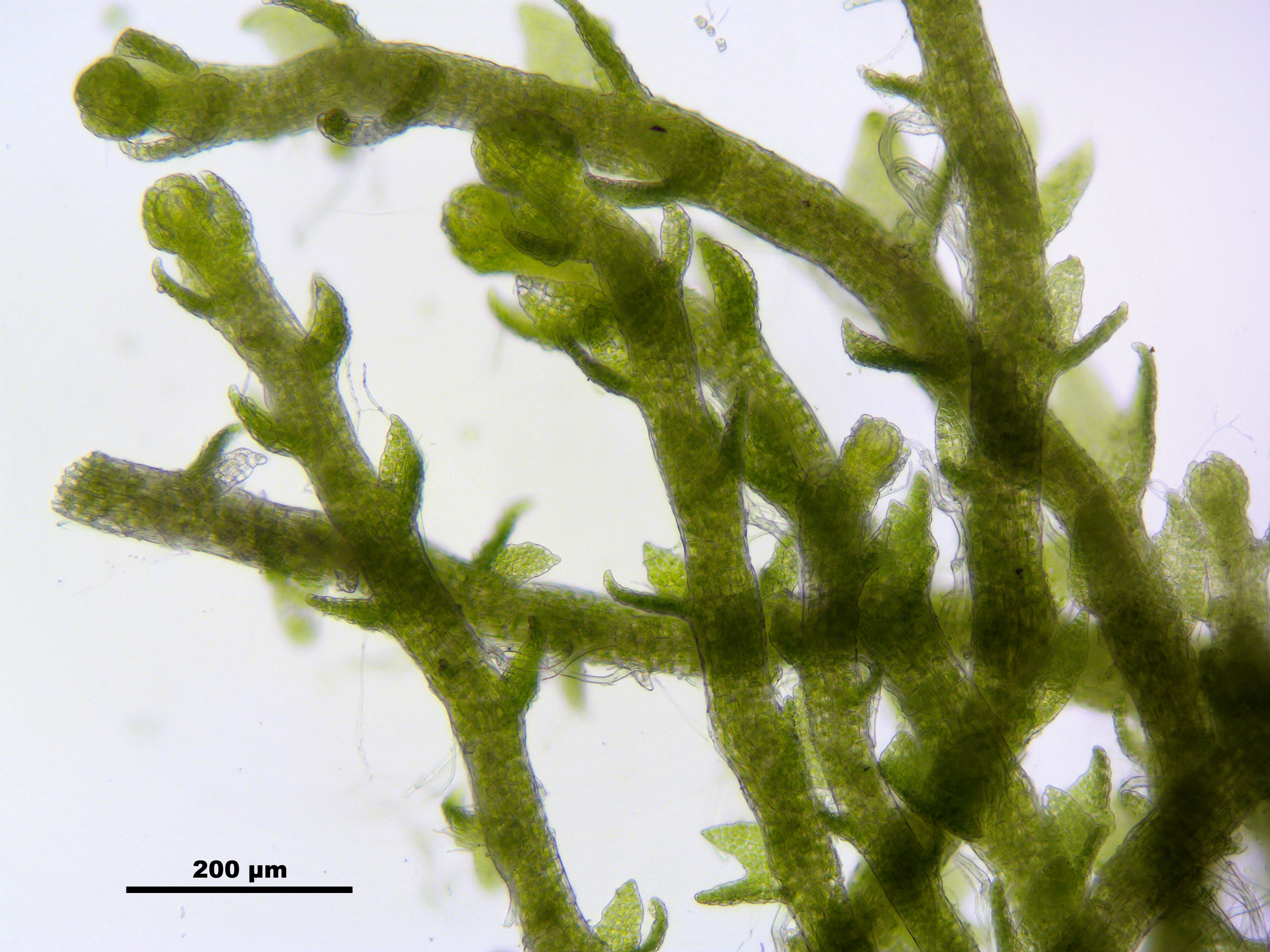
- Cephaloziella divaricata

Scientific classification
- Kingdom: Plantae
- Division: Marchantiophyta
- Class: Jungermanniopsida
- Order: Lophoziales
- Family: Cephaloziellaceae; Douin

= Cephaloziellaceae =

Family of plants

Cephaloziellaceae is a family of liverworts belonging to the order Jungermanniales.

== Genera ==
As accepted in 2016 (with the number of species in parentheses):

- Allisoniella E.A.Hodgs. (5)
- Amphicephalozia R.M.Schust. (3)
- Anastrophyllopsis (R.M.Schust.) Vána & L.Söderstr. (3)
- Cephalojonesia Grolle (1, C. incuba Grolle & Vanden Berghen )
- Cephalomitrion R.M.Schust. (1, C. aterrimum (Steph.) R.M.Schust.)
- Cephaloziella (Spruce) Schiffn. (112)
- Cephaloziopsis (Spruce) Schiffn. (5)
- Chaetophyllopsis R.M.Schust. (1, C. whiteleggei (Carrington & Pearson) R.M.Schust. ex Hamlin)
- Cylindrocolea R.M.Schust. (23)
- Gottschelia Grolle (5)
- Gymnocoleopsis (R.M.Schust.) R.M.Schust. (3)
- Herzogobryum Grolle (6)
- Kymatocalyx Herzog (5)
- Lophonardia R.M.Schust. (4)
- Nothogymnomitrion R.M.Schust. (1, N. erosum (Carrington & Pearson) R.M.Schust.)
- Obtusifolium S.W.Arnell (1, O. obtusum (Lindb.) S.W.Arnell)
- Oleolophozia L.Söderstr., De Roo & Hedd. (1, O. perssonii (H.Buch & S.W.Arnell) L.Söderstr., De Roo & Hedd.)
- Phycolepidozia R.M.Schust. (2)
- Protolophozia (R.M.Schust.) Schljakov (17)
- Ruttnerella Schiffner, 1955 (1, R. rhizocaula Schiffner)
