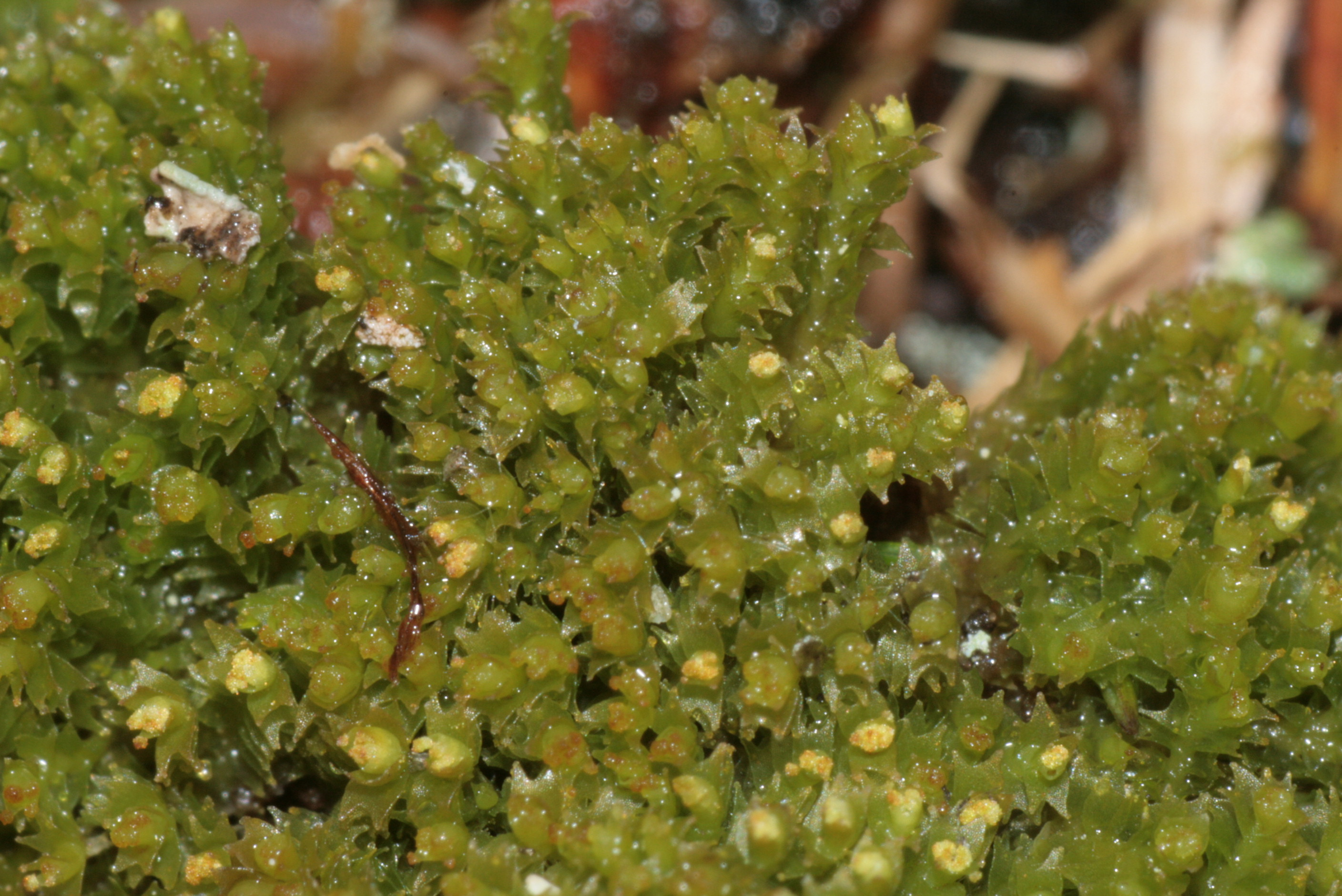
- Lophozia ventricosa

Scientific classification
- Kingdom: Plantae
- Division: Marchantiophyta
- Class: Jungermanniopsida
- Subclass: Jungermanniidae
- Order: Lophoziales; Schljakov

= Lophoziales =

Order of plants

Lophoziales is an order of liverworts containing 8 families and 344 species.

It contain the following families:

- Adelanthaceae
- Anastrophyllaceae
- Cephaloziaceae
- Cephaloziellaceae
- Obtusifoliaceae
- Oleolophoziaceae
- Lophoziaceae
- Scapaniaceae
