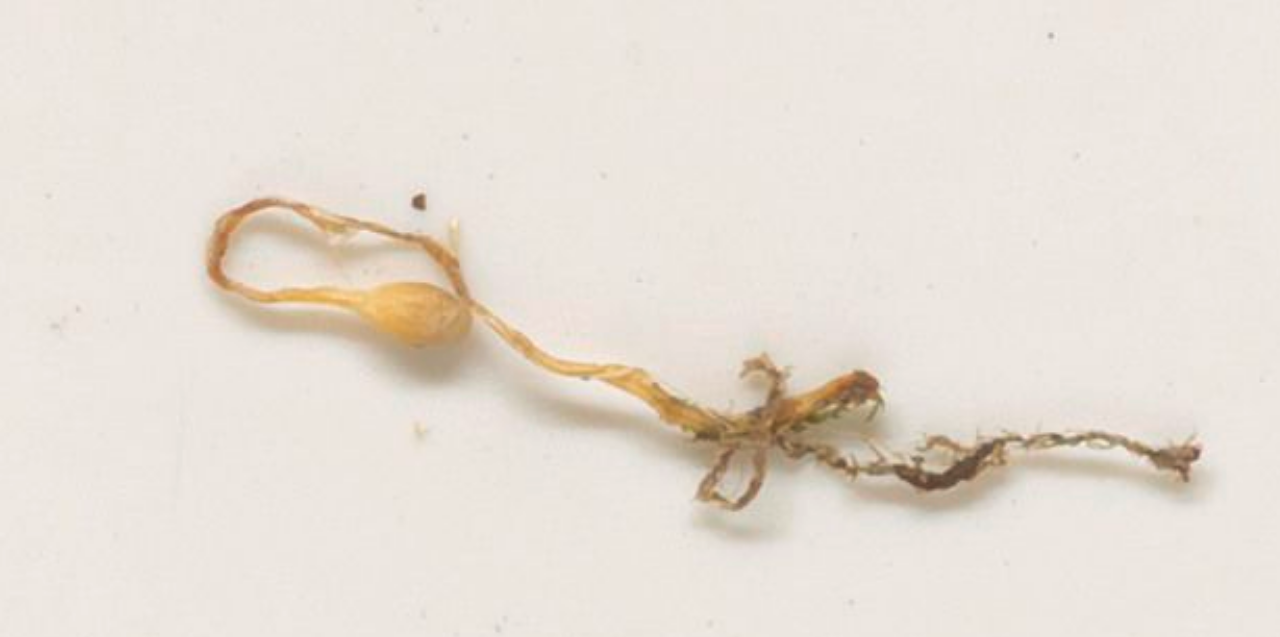

Scientific classification
- Kingdom: Plantae
- Division: Marchantiophyta
- Class: Jungermanniopsida
- Order: Metzgeriales
- Family: Aneuraceae
- Genus: Aneura
- Species: A. mirabilis

Binomial name
- Aneura mirabilis (Malmb.) Wickett et Goffinet

Synonyms
- Cryptothallus mirabilis Malmb.

= Aneura mirabilis =

Species of liverwort

Aneura mirabilis is a parasitic species of liverwort in the family Aneuraceae. It was first described in 1933, as Cryptothallus mirabilis. Plants of this species are white as a result of lacking chlorophyll, and their plastids do not differentiate into chloroplasts.

== Description ==
Aneura mirabilis is a subterranean myco-heterotroph that obtains its nutrients from the abundant fungi growing among its tissues rather than from photosynthesis. The infecting fungus is a basidiomycete, a species of Tulasnella, which is also the case in fungi associated with other species of Aneura, as well as the related genus Riccardia. However, this is not the case for other members of the Metzgeriales that have been studied. Plants are white, lacking chlorophyll, and their plastids do not differentiate into chloroplasts. They are small, seldom growing more than 3 cm (1.2 in) long.

The species is dioicous, with individual plants producing either antheridia or archegonia, but never both. The female plants (with archegonia) are typically ten times the size of the male plants. The development of reproductive structures is not controlled by photoperiod, but does require a temperature of at least 21 °C (70 °F) following a period of sufficiently low temperature.

== Taxonomy ==
Aneura mirabilis was first reported by M. Denis in 1919, who considered it simply as a form of A. pinguis lacking chlorophyll. In 1933, S. Malmborg placed it in a separate genus, Cryptothallus. Apart from lacking chlorophyll, it is very similar to species in the genus Aneura, and the validity of recognizing Cryptothallus as a separate genus was questioned by Karen Renzaglia in 1982, who suggested it may be considered "merely as an achlorophyllous species of Aneura." A molecular phylogenetic study in 2008 placed the species firmly within Aneura, and it was transferred to that genus. This decision was confirmed by a larger molecular phylogenetic study in 2010.

It is suggested that the ancestor of Aneura mirabilis, like the related A. pinguis, had a mutualistic mycorrhizal association with Tulasnella, which was also able to form mycorrhizal connections with neighbouring trees. This evolved into a relationship where A. mirabilis gave up photosynthesis and obtained all its nutrients from the fungus, which in turn obtained them from the associated trees. Other evolutionary lineages of myco-heterotrophic plants have been shown to have evolved from photosynthetic, mycorrhizal ancestors.

Initially, A. mirabilis was the only species of bryophyte known with the same combination of characteristics, but in 1977 and 1979, a second species was collected in Costa Rica, and described in 1996 as Cryptothallus hirsutus (now Aneura crumii). As of 2008, it had not been observed again.

== Distribution and habitat ==
Plants have been found in locations across northern Europe, and once in Greenland. They grow in bogs and are typically found underneath peat moss or other dense moss growth near birch trees.
