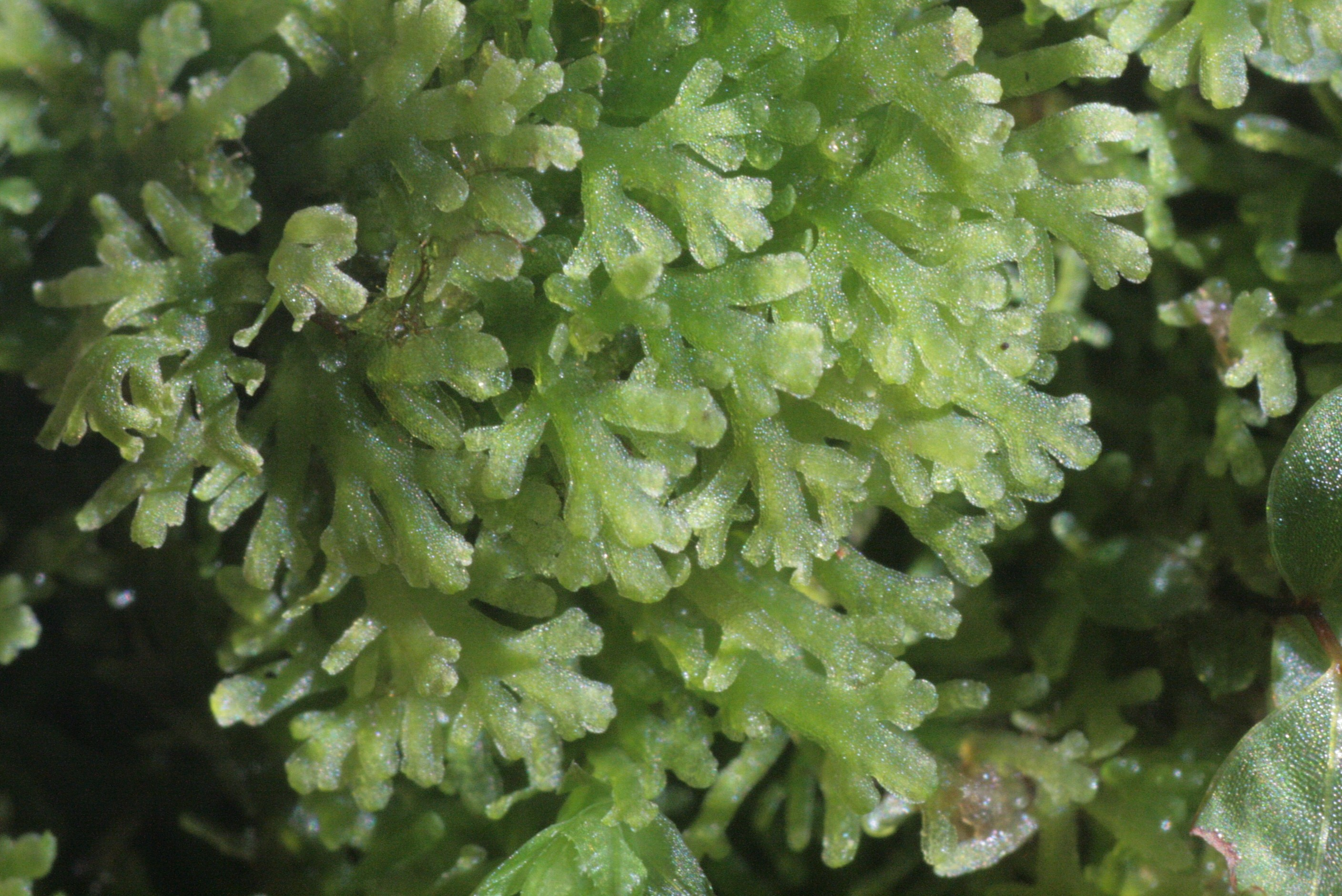

Scientific classification
- Kingdom: Plantae
- Division: Marchantiophyta
- Class: Jungermanniopsida
- Order: Metzgeriales
- Family: Aneuraceae
- Genus: Riccardia
- Species: R. multifida

Binomial name
- Riccardia multifida (L.) Gray

= Riccardia multifida =

Species of liverwort

Riccardia multifida is a species of liverwort belonging to the family Aneuraceae.

It has cosmopolitan distribution, and is widely found on both coasts of North America, Europe, and east Asia.

A novel group of phytochemicals isolated from R. multifida in 1983, dubbed Riccardins have demonstrated significant preclinical anticancer potential against immortalized human osteosarcoma cell lines.
