= Lissanthe powelliae =

Scientific classification
- Kingdom: Plantae
- Clade: Tracheophytes
- Clade: Angiosperms
- Clade: Eudicots
- Clade: Asterids
- Order: Ericales
- Family: Ericaceae
- Genus: Lissanthe
- Species: L. powelliae

Binomial name
- Lissanthe powelliae Crayn & E.A.Br.

Species of shrub

Lissanthe powelliae is a species of flowering plant in the family Ericaceae and is endemic to the south-west of Western Australia. It is an erect to spreading, branching shrub that typically grows up to 1 m (3 ft 3 in) high. The flowers are white and borne on a pedicel above bracteoles and are hairy in the lobes and in the throat. Flowering occurs from July to September.

Lissanthe powelliae was first formally described in 2003 by Darren Crayn and Elizabeth Brown in Australian Systematic Botany from specimens collected about 35 km (22 mi) east of Jurien Bay in 1992. The specific epithet (powelliae) honours Jocelyn Marie Powell, a botanist in New South Wales.

This species grows on slopes and on the base of breakaways in the Geraldton Sandplains bioregion of south-western Western Australia.
