= Riccardia elegans =

Scientific classification
- Kingdom: Plantae
- Division: Marchantiophyta
- Class: Jungermanniopsida
- Order: Metzgeriales
- Family: Aneuraceae
- Genus: Riccardia
- Species: R. elegans

Binomial name
- Riccardia elegans (Steph.) Hürl.

Synonyms
- Aneura elegans Steph.

Species of liverwort

Riccardia elegans is a species of plants in the liverwort family Aneuraceae.
