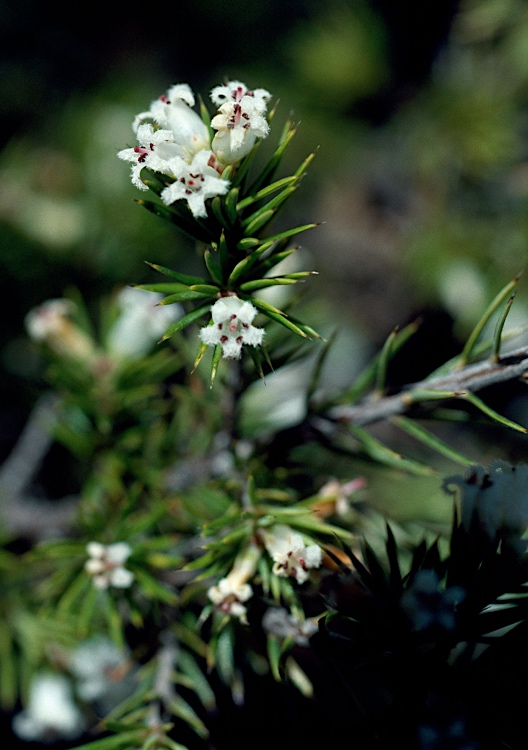
- In Carnarvon National Park

Scientific classification
- Kingdom: Plantae
- Clade: Tracheophytes
- Clade: Angiosperms
- Clade: Eudicots
- Clade: Asterids
- Order: Ericales
- Family: Ericaceae
- Genus: Lissanthe
- Species: L. pluriloculata

Binomial name
- Lissanthe pluriloculata (F.Muell.) J.M.Powell Crayn & E.A.Br.

Synonyms
- Leucopogon pluriloculatus F.Muell.; Styphelia pluriloculata (F.Muell.) F.Muell.

= Lissanthe pluriloculata =

Species of shrub

Lissanthe pluriloculata is a species of flowering plant in the family Ericaceae and is endemic to Queensland. It is a small, bushy shrub with sharply-pointed linear leaves and spikes or racemes of tube-shaped, white flowers.

== Description ==
Lissanthe pluriloculata is small but robust, bushy shrub with branchlets covered with short, soft hairs. The leaves are crowded, sharply-pointed, and concave, mostly about 12 mm (0.47 in) long with the edges turned under. The flowers are mostly borne in short spikes or racemes on the ends of the branches with very small bracts and bracteoles at the base. The sepals are blunt, 1.6–2 mm (0.063–0.079 in) long and the petal are joined at the base, forming a tube slightly longer than the sepals with lobes nearly as long as the petal tube.

== Taxonomy ==
This species was first formally described in 1863 by Ferdinand von Mueller who gave it the name Leucopogon pluriloculata in his Fragmenta phytographiae Australiae from specimens collected near the Burnett River. In 2005, Jocelyn Marie Powell, Crayn and Elizabeth Brown transferred the species to Lissanthe as L. pluriloculata in Australian Systematic Botany. The specific epithet (pluriloculata) means "having several locules or cavities".

== Distribution ==
Lissanthe pluriloculata is endemic to Queensland where it is listed as "of least concern".
