= Lissanthe scabra =

Conservation status
- Priority Two — Poorly Known Taxa (DEC)

Scientific classification
- Kingdom: Plantae
- Clade: Tracheophytes
- Clade: Angiosperms
- Clade: Eudicots
- Clade: Asterids
- Order: Ericales
- Family: Ericaceae
- Genus: Lissanthe
- Species: L. scabra

Binomial name
- Lissanthe scabra Crayn & E.A.Br.

Species of shrub

Lissanthe scabra is a species of flowering plant in the family Ericaceae and is endemic to the south-west of Western Australia. It is a rigid, erect, branching shrub that typically grows up to 1 m (3 ft 3 in) high. The flowers are white and borne on a pedicel above bracteoles.

Lissanthe scabra was first formally described in 2003 by Darren Crayn and Elizabeth Brown in Australian Systematic Botany from specimens collected by Michael Hislop in 2000. The specific epithet (scabra) means "rough", referring to the stem.

This species grows on breakaways and uplands in the Avon Wheatbelt and Coolgardie bioregions of south-western Western Australia. It is listed as "Priority Two" by the Western Australian Government Department of Biodiversity, Conservation and Attractions, meaning that it is poorly known and from only one or a few locations.
