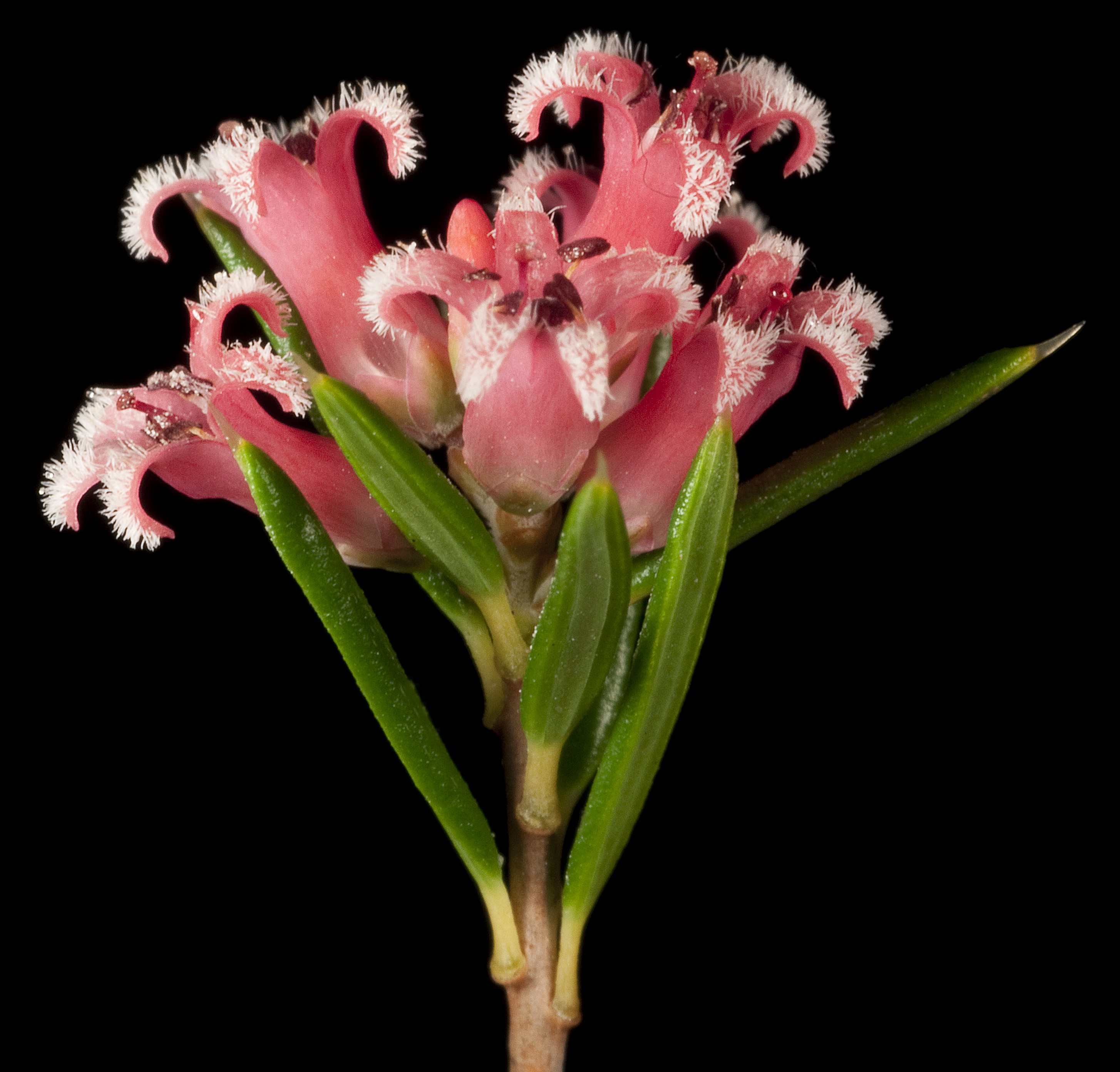
- In Kau Rock Nature Reserve near Condingup

Scientific classification
- Kingdom: Plantae
- Clade: Tracheophytes
- Clade: Angiosperms
- Clade: Eudicots
- Clade: Asterids
- Order: Ericales
- Family: Ericaceae
- Genus: Lissanthe
- Species: L. rubicunda

Binomial name
- Lissanthe rubicunda (F.Muell.) J.M.Powell Crayn & E.A.Br.

Synonyms
- Cyathodes rubicunda F.Muell.; Leucopogon rubicunda D.M.Crayn, E.A.Br. & J.M.Powell orth. var.; Leucopogon rubicundus (F.Muell.) Benth. nom. illeg., nom. superfl.; Styphelia rubicunda (F.Muell.) F.Muell.

= Lissanthe rubicunda =

Species of shrub

Lissanthe rubicunda is a species of flowering plant in the family Ericaceae and is endemic to the south of Western Australia. It is a slender, erect to spreading shrub with few branches and sharply-pointed linear leaves and short spikes or racemes of red, tube-shaped flowers.

== Description ==
Lissanthe rubicunda is a slender, erect to spreading shrub with few branches that typically grows to a height of up to 1 m (3 ft 3 in). Its leaves are sharply-pointed, and mostly about 6.5 mm (0.26 in) long and furrowed on the lower surface. The flowers are borne in short spikes or racemes on the ends of the branches, each flower on a pedicel about 1 mm (0.039 in) long with smaller bracts and bracteoles at the base. The sepals are broadly egg-shaped and about 1 mm (0.039 in) long and the petal are red, joined at the base, forming a tube about 6.5 mm (0.26 in) long with lobes more than 2 mm (0.079 in) long and bearded near the ends.

== Taxonomy ==
This species was first formally described in 1864 by Ferdinand von Mueller who gave it the name Cyathodes rubicunda in his Fragmenta phytographiae Australiae from specimens collected by George Maxwell. In 1867, Mueller transferred the species to Styphelia as S. rubicunda in a later edition of the Fragmenta. In 2005, Jocelyn Marie Powell, Crayn and Elizabeth Brown transferred the species to Lissanthe as L. rubicunda in Australian Systematic Botany. The specific epithet (rubicunda) means "red" or "ruddy".

== Distribution ==
Lissanthe rubicunda grows in sandy and clay soils, spongolite, limestone and laterite on planis, slopes, watercourses, swamp edges and winter-wet places in the Coolgardie, Esperance Plains and Mallee bioregions of southern Western Australia.
