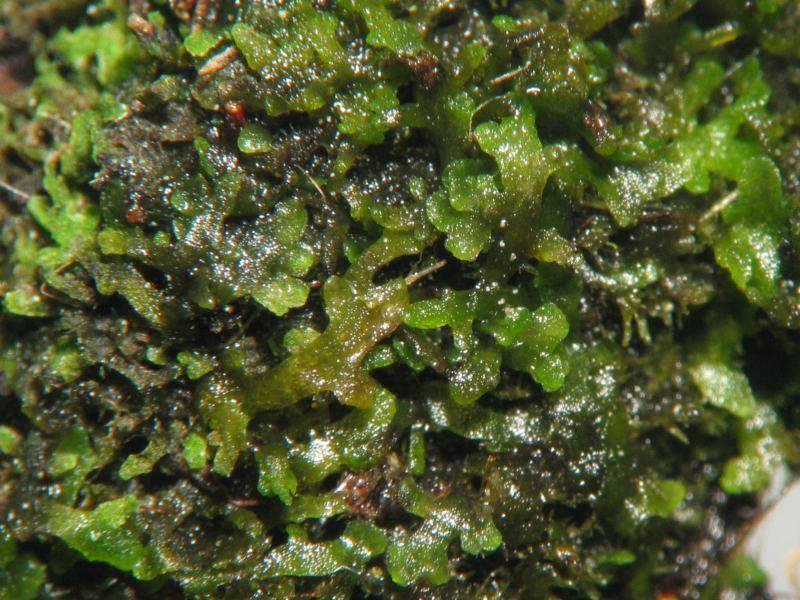

Scientific classification
- Kingdom: Plantae
- Division: Marchantiophyta
- Class: Jungermanniopsida
- Order: Metzgeriales
- Family: Aneuraceae
- Genus: Riccardia
- Species: R. chamedryfolia

Binomial name
- Riccardia chamedryfolia (With.) Grolle

= Riccardia chamedryfolia =

Species of liverwort

Riccardia chamedryfolia, the jagged germanderwort, is a species of liverwort, a terrestrial plant which has been adapted by aquarist as an ornamental plant for the freshwater planted aquarium hobby. It is also known as Mini or Coral Pellia due to its growth similarity to coral when submerged underwater). It is native to the damp forests of south eastern places of Asia but is now generally spread throughout the world.
