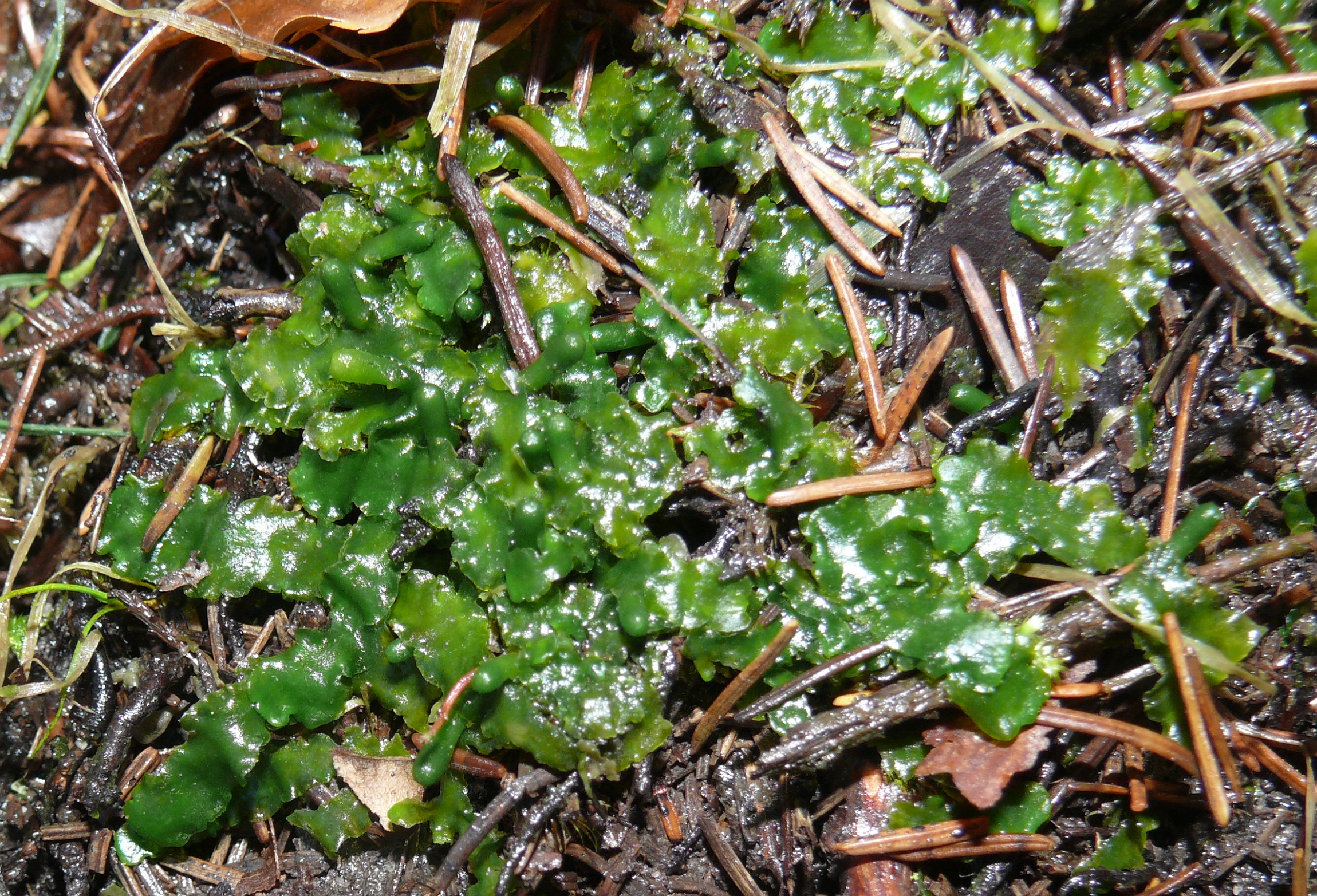
- Aneura pinguis, Schwäbisch-Fränkischer Wald, Germany

Scientific classification
- Kingdom: Plantae
- Division: Marchantiophyta
- Class: Jungermanniopsida
- Order: Metzgeriales
- Family: Aneuraceae
- Genus: Aneura; Dumort.

Species
- See text

= Aneura (plant) =

Genus of liverworts

Aneura is a genus of liverworts in the family Aneuraceae.

== Species ==
The 2016 world checklist of hornworts and liverworts listed the following species, placed into three categories.

Fully accepted

- Aneura blasioides (Horik.) Furuki
- Aneura crateriformis Furuki & D.G.Long
- Aneura hirsuta Furuki
- Aneura marianensis Furuki
- Aneura maxima (Schiffn.) Steph.
- Aneura mirabilis (Malmb.) Wickett & Goffinet
- Aneura novaguineensis Hewson
- Aneura pinguis (L.) Dumort.

Insufficient knowledge

- Aneura brasiliensis (Ångstr.) Steph.
- Aneura cerebrata Hewson
- Aneura crumii L.Söderstr.
- Aneura eachamensis Hewson
- Aneura erronea Steph.
- Aneura eskuchei Hässel
- Aneura gemmifera Furuki
- Aneura gibbsiana Steph.
- Aneura glaucescens Steph.
- Aneura imbricata Colenso
- Aneura kaguaensis Hewson
- Aneura keniae Gola
- Aneura latissima Spruce
- Aneura macrostachya Spruce
- Aneura novaecaledoniae R.M.Schust.
- Aneura pellucida Colenso
- Aneura polyantha Colenso
- Aneura punctata Colenso
- Aneura rodwayi Hewson
- Aneura rotangicola Steph.
- Aneura sharpii Inoue & N.G.Mill.
- Aneura subcanaliculata R.M.Schust.

Serious doubts as to validity

- Aneura amboinensis Steph.
- Aneura augustae Steph.
- Aneura biflora Colenso
- Aneura brevissima Steph.
- Aneura crinita C.Massal.
- Aneura densa Steph.
- Aneura denticulata Mitt. ex Thurn
- Aneura giangena Hewson
- Aneura goebeliana Steph.
- Aneura hunsteinii Steph.
- Aneura latemultifida Steph.
- Aneura ledermannii Steph.
- Aneura nymannii Steph.
- Aneura roraimensis Steph.
- Aneura serrulata Gottsche ex Steph.
- Aneura singalangana (Schiffn.) Steph.
- Aneura subledermannii Steph.
- Aneura subtenerrima Steph.
- Aneura vincentina Steph.

Names brought to synonymy

- Aneura elegans, a synonym for Riccardia elegans
