= Lissanthe brevistyla =

Conservation status
- Endangered (NCA)

Scientific classification
- Kingdom: Plantae
- Clade: Embryophytes
- Clade: Tracheophytes
- Clade: Spermatophytes
- Clade: Angiosperms
- Clade: Eudicots
- Clade: Asterids
- Order: Ericales
- Family: Ericaceae
- Genus: Lissanthe
- Species: L. brevistyla

Binomial name
- Lissanthe brevistyla A.R.Bean

Species of shrub

Lissanthe brevistyla is a species of Australian flowering plant in the family Ericaceae and is endemic to Queensland. It is a spreading shrub with sharply-pointed, lance-shaped leaves and spikes of 18 to 26 tube-shaped, white or pink flowers.

== Description ==
Lissanthe brevistyla is a spreading shrub that typically grows to 1.5 m (4 ft 11 in) high and 2.5 m (8 ft 2 in) wide, its branchlets covered with short, soft hairs. The leaves are sharply-pointed, lance-shaped, 10–25 mm (0.39–0.98 in) long and 1.8–3 mm (0.071–0.118 in) wide on a petiole 0.8–1.5 mm (0.031–0.059 in) long. The flowers are borne in upper-most leaf axils on a spike up to 25 mm (0.98 in) long, with 18 to 26 bisexual flowers, with a round bract and 2 bracteoles at the base of the flower. There are five, broadly egg-shaped sepals 0.5–1 mm (0.020–0.039 in) long and 0.5–0.8 mm (0.020–0.031 in) wide. The petals are white or pink and joined at the base to form an urn-shaped tube 1.8–2.6 mm (0.071–0.102 in) long with 5 triangular lobes 0.7–0.9 mm (0.028–0.035 in) long with long, curved hairs inside. The anthers are 0.4–0.6 mm (0.016–0.024 in) long and the style is 0.5–0.7 mm (0.020–0.028 in) long and much shorter than the petal tube. Flowering has been observed in November and is followed by spherical fruit 4–6 mm (0.16–0.24 in) in diameter.

== Taxonomy ==
Lissanthe brevistyla was first formally described in 2001 by Anthony Bean in the journal Austrobaileya from a specimen collected in the Gumigil Mining Lease, near the Bruce Highway in 1999. The specific epithet (brevistyla) means "having a short style".

== Distribution and habitat ==
This species grows on steep hillsides in woodland near Marlborough in central coastal Queensland.

== Conservation Status ==
Lissanthe brevistyla is listed as "endangered" under the Queensland Government Nature Conservation Act 1992. It is not listed under the Australian Government Environment Protection and Biodiversity Conservation Act 1999.
