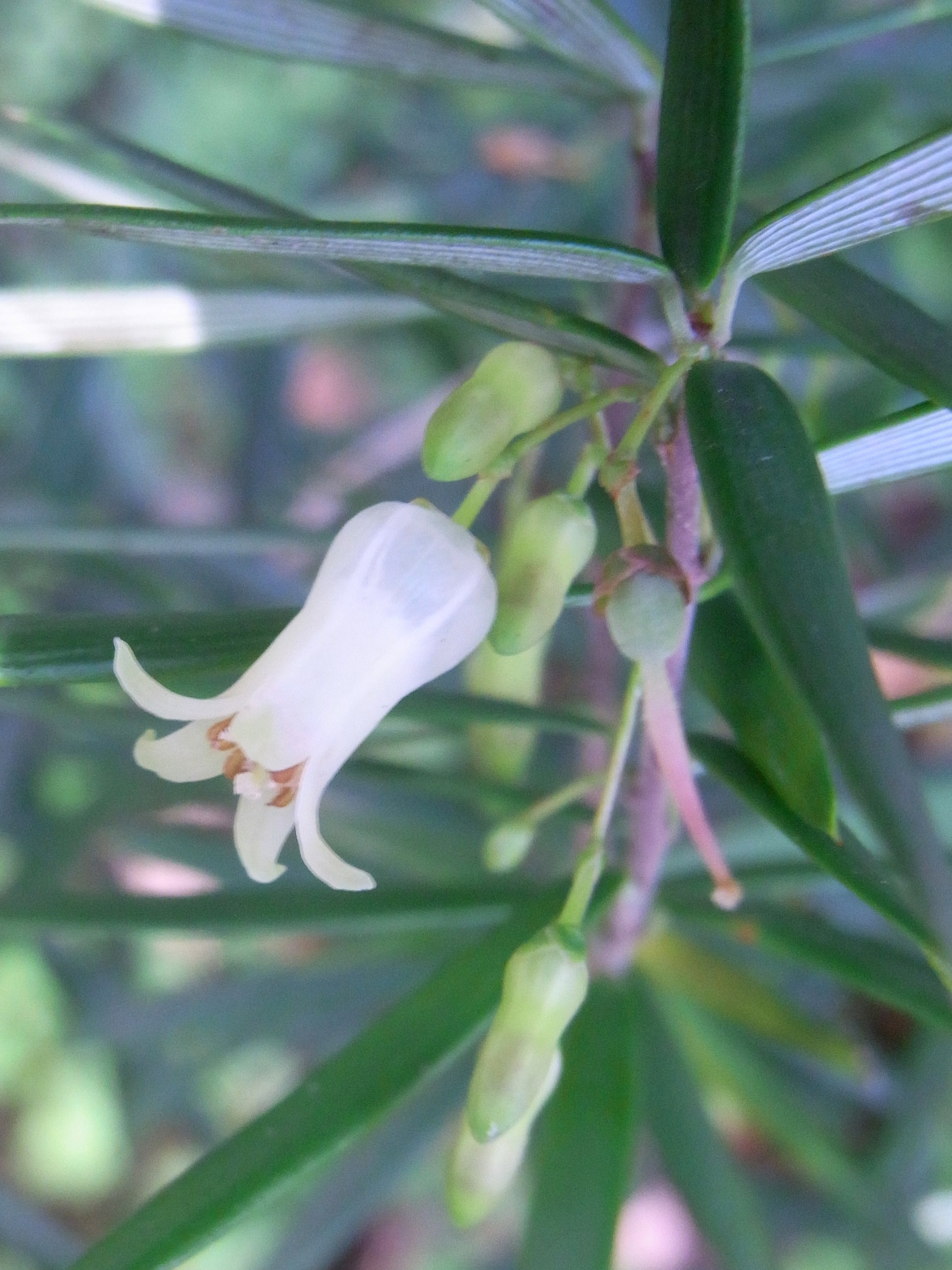
- Blue Gum Forest, Australia

Scientific classification
- Kingdom: Plantae
- Clade: Tracheophytes
- Clade: Angiosperms
- Clade: Eudicots
- Clade: Asterids
- Order: Ericales
- Family: Ericaceae
- Genus: Lissanthe
- Species: L. sapida

Binomial name
- Lissanthe sapida R.Br.

= Lissanthe sapida =

Species of shrub

Lissanthe sapida, sometimes referred as the native cranberry, is a species of flowering plant in the family Ericaceae, and is endemic to areas near Sydney Australia. It is a bushy scrub with more or less lance-shaped leaves and creamy-white, cylindrical flowers.

== Description ==
Lissanthe sapida is a bushy shrub that typically grows to a height of 1 m (3 ft 3 in), sometimes to 2.5 m (8 ft 2 in) and has bristly branchlets. Its leaves are more or less lance-shaped, sometimes with the narrower end towards the base, 15.5–27.5 mm (0.61–1.08 in) long and 2.2–4.2 mm (0.087–0.165 in) wide on a petiole 1.3–2.7 mm (0.051–0.106 in) long. There are 7 or 8 ribs on the lower surface of the leaves. Up to 4 pendent, creamy-white flowers are borne in leaf axils with bracteoles 0.75–1.1 mm (0.030–0.043 in) long at the base. The sepals are 1.6–1.9 mm (0.063–0.075 in) long and the petals are joined at the base to form a cylindrical tube 5.4–6.5 mm (0.21–0.26 in) long with glabrous lobes 2.1–3.9 mm (0.083–0.154 in) long. Flowering occurs from July to September and the fruit is a glabrous red, spherical to oval capsule about 5.7 mm (0.22 in) long.

== Taxonomy ==
Lissanthe sapida was first formally described in 1810 by Robert Brown in his Prodromus Florae Novae Hollandiae et Insulae Van Diemen. The specific epithet (sapida) means "savoury" or "well-flavoured".

== Distribution and habitat ==
Lissanthe sapida grows on ridges, hillsides and rocky ledges in open forest on sandy soil on sandstone. It is found in the lower Blue Mountains, including near Glenbrook, Woodford and Lawson.

== Conservation status ==
Native cranberry is a rare plant, with a ROTAP rating of 3RCa, it grows in dry eucalyptus woodlands and rocky areas, on soils based on sandstone at altitudes of up to 800 m (2,600 ft).
