= John Brown (umpire) =

New Zealand cricket umpire

Personal information
- Full name: John Martin Ainley Brown
- Born: 27 April 1928; England
- Died: 12 January 2005 (aged 76); Auckland, New Zealand

Umpiring information
- Tests umpired: 2 (1963–1964)
- Source: Cricinfo, 1 July 2013

John Martin Ainley Brown (27 April 1928 – 12 January 2005) was a New Zealand plant physiologist and cricket umpire. He stood in two Test matches between 1963 and 1964.

Born in England, Brown earned his PhD at Durham University. He moved to New Zealand in 1956, becoming Professor of Plant Physiology at the University of Auckland, specialising in aquatic macrophytes. His daughter, Elizabeth Anne Brown, born in Auckland in late 1956, was a noted bryologist.

Brown umpired 10 first-class matches between January 1961 and January 1966, all but one of them at Eden Park in Auckland.

== See also ==
- List of Test cricket umpires
