= Lissanthe synandra =

Conservation status
- Priority One — Poorly Known Taxa (DEC)

Scientific classification
- Kingdom: Plantae
- Clade: Tracheophytes
- Clade: Angiosperms
- Clade: Eudicots
- Clade: Asterids
- Order: Ericales
- Family: Ericaceae
- Genus: Lissanthe
- Species: L. synandra

Binomial name
- Lissanthe synandra Crayn & Hislop

Species of shrub

Lissanthe synandra is a species of flowering plant in the family Ericaceae and is endemic to the south of Western Australia. It is a robust, dense, spreading shrub that typically grows to a height of up to 1.5 m (4 ft 11 in). The species was first formally described in 2005 by Darren Crayn and Michael Clyde Hislop in Australian Systematic Botany.

The specific epithet (synandra) means "together with males", referring to the united stamens.

This species grows in sand over limestone on ridges, sand dunes and valleys in the Esperance Plains bioregion of Western Australia and is listed as "Priority One" by the Government of Western Australia Department of Biodiversity, Conservation and Attractions, meaning that it is known from only one or a few locations where it is potentially at risk.
