= Lissanthe pleurandroides =

Scientific classification
- Kingdom: Plantae
- Clade: Tracheophytes
- Clade: Angiosperms
- Clade: Eudicots
- Clade: Asterids
- Order: Ericales
- Family: Ericaceae
- Genus: Lissanthe
- Species: L. pleurandroides

Binomial name
- Lissanthe pleurandroides (F.Muell.) Crayn & Hislop

Synonyms
- Leucopogon pleurandroides F.Muell.; Styphelia pleurandroides (F.Muell.) F.Muell.

Species of shrub

Lissanthe pleurandroides is a species of flowering plant in the family Ericaceae and is endemic to the south of Western Australia. It is an erect, moderately dense shrub with oblong leaves and spikes of tube-shaped, white or pink flowers.

== Description ==
Lissanthe pleurandroides is an erect, moderately dense shrub that typically grows to 1 m (3 ft 3 in) high, its branchlets covered sometimes with short, soft hairs. The leaves are oblong, 4 mm (0.16 in) long on a petiole 1–2 mm (0.039–0.079 in) long with two longitudinal furrows on the lower surface. The flowers are borne in dense spike or clusters on the ends of the branches on a spike about the same length as the leaves with very small bracts and bracteoles less than half the length of the sepals. The sepals are about 2 mm (0.079 in) long with soft hairs on the edges. The petal are joined at the base, forming a tube about 4 mm (0.16 in) long with lobes about 2 mm (0.079 in) long.

== Taxonomy ==
This species was first formally described in 1863 by Ferdinand von Mueller who gave it the name Leucopogon pleurandroides in his Fragmenta phytographiae Australiae from specimens collected by George Maxwell. In 2005, Darren Crayn and Michael Hislop transferred the species to Lissanthe as L. pleurandroides. The specific epithet (pleurandroides) means "Pleurandra-like". (Pleurandra is now known as Hibbertia).

== Distribution and habitat ==
Lissanthe pleurandroides grows in chalky soils in coastal or near-coastal areas in the Esperance Plains bioregion of southern Western Australia.
