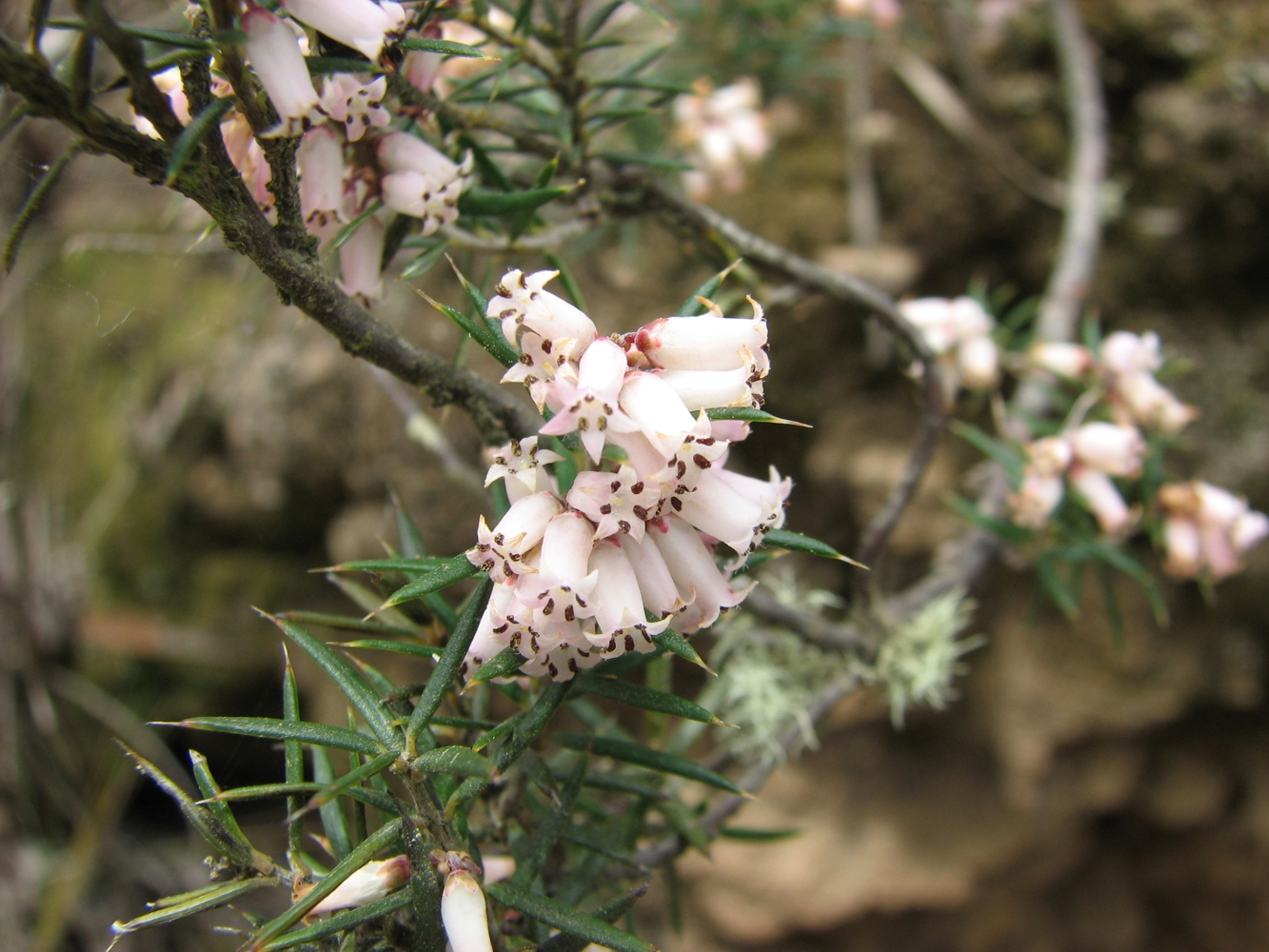
- Lissanthe strigosa subsp. subulata

Scientific classification
- Kingdom: Plantae
- Clade: Tracheophytes
- Clade: Angiosperms
- Clade: Eudicots
- Clade: Asterids
- Order: Ericales
- Family: Ericaceae
- Subfamily: Epacridoideae
- Tribe: Styphelieae
- Genus: Lissanthe; R.Br.

= Lissanthe =

Genus of shrubs

Lissanthe is a genus of about 10 species of flowering plants in the family Ericaceae and is endemic to Australia. Plants in the genus Lissanthe are small, erect to spreading shrubs with egg-shaped to oblong leaves. Up to 17 bisexual flowers are arranged in leaf axils or on the ends of branches, the 5 petals joined at the base to form a cylindrical to urn-shaped tube with triangular lobes.

== Description ==
Plants in the genus Lissanthe are small, erect to spreading shrubs with egg-shaped to oblong, petiolate leaves that are usually a paler shade of green on the lower surface. The leaves have a small point on the tip and a few parallel veins on the lower surface. Up to 17 bisexual flowers are arranged in leaf axils or on the ends of branchlets with a bract and 2 bracteoles at the base of the flowers. The 5 petals are joined at the base to form a cylindrical to urn-shaped tube that is longer than the sepals and has triangular, valvate, glabrous lobes in the bud, and spreading to curved backwards in the open flower. The style is enclosed within the petal tube and the style is lobed. The fruits is drupe with a hard covering.

== Taxonomy ==
The genus Lissanthe was first formally described in 1810 by Robert Brown in his Prodromus Florae Novae Hollandiae et Insulae Van Diemen. The name Lissanthe means "a smooth flower", referring to the petal lobes that are not bearded.

== Species list ==
The following is a list of Lissanthe species accepted by the Australian Plant Census as at February 2024:

- Lissanthe brevistyla A.R.Bean (Qld.)
- Lissanthe pleurandroides (F.Muell.) Crayn & Hislop (W.A.)
- Lissanthe pluriloculata (F.Muell.) J.M.Powell, Crayn & E.A.Br. (Qld.)
- Lissanthe powelliae Crayn & E.A.Br. (W.A.)
- Lissanthe rubicunda (F.Muell.) J.M.Powell, Crayn & E.A.Br. (W.A.)
- Lissanthe sapida R.Br. – native cranberry (N.S.W.)
- Lissanthe scabra Crayn & E.A.Br. (W.A.)
- Lissanthe strigosa (Sm.) R.Br.
  - Lissanthe strigosa (Sm.) R.Br. subsp. strigosa (N.S.W.)
  - Lissanthe strigosa subsp. subulata (R.Br.) J.M.Powell (S.A., Qld., N.S.W., A.C.T., Vic., Tas.)
- Lissanthe synandra Crayn & Hislop (W.A.)

== Distribution ==
Species of Lissanthe are found in all Australian states but not in the Northern Territory.
