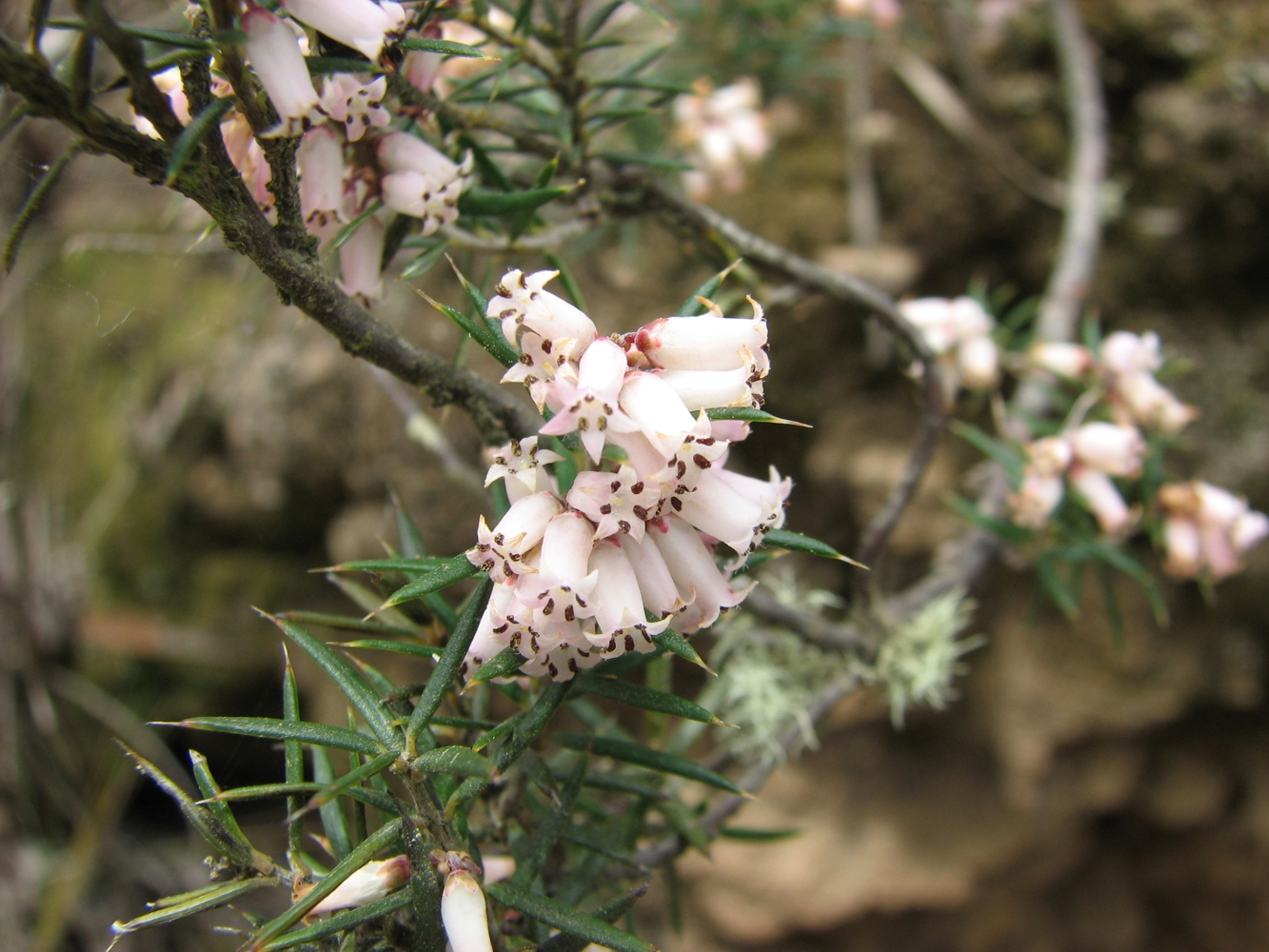
- Subspecies subulata in Enfield State Park

Scientific classification
- Kingdom: Plantae
- Clade: Tracheophytes
- Clade: Angiosperms
- Clade: Eudicots
- Clade: Asterids
- Order: Ericales
- Family: Ericaceae
- Genus: Lissanthe
- Species: L. strigosa

Binomial name
- Lissanthe strigosa (Sm.) R.Br.

= Lissanthe strigosa =

Species of plant

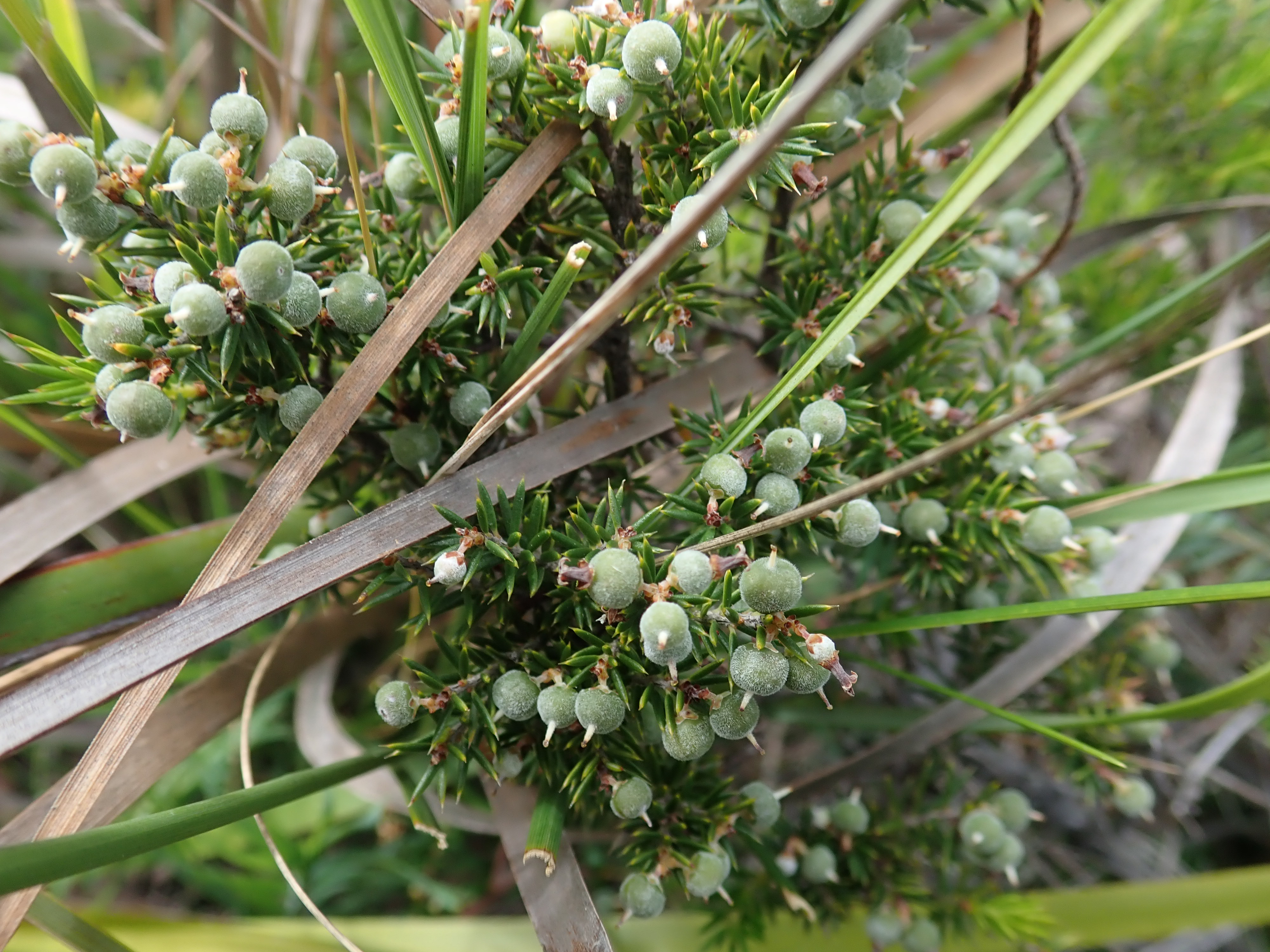
Fruit at Bilgola headland

Lissanthe strigosa, commonly known as peach heath, is a species of flowering plant in the family Ericaceae, and is endemic to south-eastern Australia. It is a shrub with linear to lance-shaped leaves and white to pink, cylindrical flowers.

== Description ==
Lissanthe strigosa is a much-branched shrub 10–100 cm (3.9–39.4 in) high, and often forms suckers, its branchlets covered with tiny bristles. The leaves are linear to lance-shaped, 6.5–13.9 mm (0.26–0.55 in) long and 0.7–2.0 mm (0.028–0.079 in) wide on a petiole 0.8–1.3 mm (0.031–0.051 in) long with three longitudinal ribs on the lower surface. The flowers are borne in racemes of 5 to 9 with bracteoles 0.8–1.0 mm (0.031–0.039 in) long at the base. The sepals are 1.1–1.2 mm (0.043–0.047 in) long and the petal are white or pink and joined at the base, forming a more or less glabrous tube 3.5–4 mm (0.14–0.16 in) long with lobes about 1.5–2.4 mm (0.059–0.094 in) long. The style is 2.6–3.1 mm (0.10–0.12 in) long and covered with soft hairs near its base. Flowering occurs from August to November and the fruit is a flattened spherical, capsule 2.5–2.9 mm (0.098–0.114 in) long, white and fleshy.

== Taxonomy ==
This species was first formally described in 1793 by James Edward Smith who gave it the name Styphelia strigosa in a A Specimen of the Botany of New Holland. In 1810, Robert Brown transferred the species to Lissanthe as L. strigosa in his Prodromus Florae Novae Hollandiae. The specific epithet means strigose.

In 1994, Jocelyn Powell described two subspecies of L. strigosa in the journal Telopea, and the names are accepted by the Australian Plant Census:

- Lissanthe strigosa (Sm.) R.Br. subsp. strigosa has leaves 3.4–5.8 mm (0.13–0.23 in) long and 0.5–0.8 mm (0.020–0.031 in) wide.
- Lissanthe strigosa subsp. subulata (R.Br.) J.M.Powell has leaves 6.1–16.5 mm (0.24–0.65 in) long and 0.7–2.2 mm (0.028–0.087 in) wide.

== Distribution and habitat ==
Peach heath is widely distributed in Queensland, Victoria, Tasmania and South Australia, where it grows in forest, scrub and heath on sandy soils. Subspecies strigosa is restricted to the Central Coast of New South Wales, where it grows in poorly-drained clay soils. Subspecies subulata is found in eastern New South Wales and as far east as the Pilliga forest and in Queensland, Victoria, Tasmania and South Australia.
