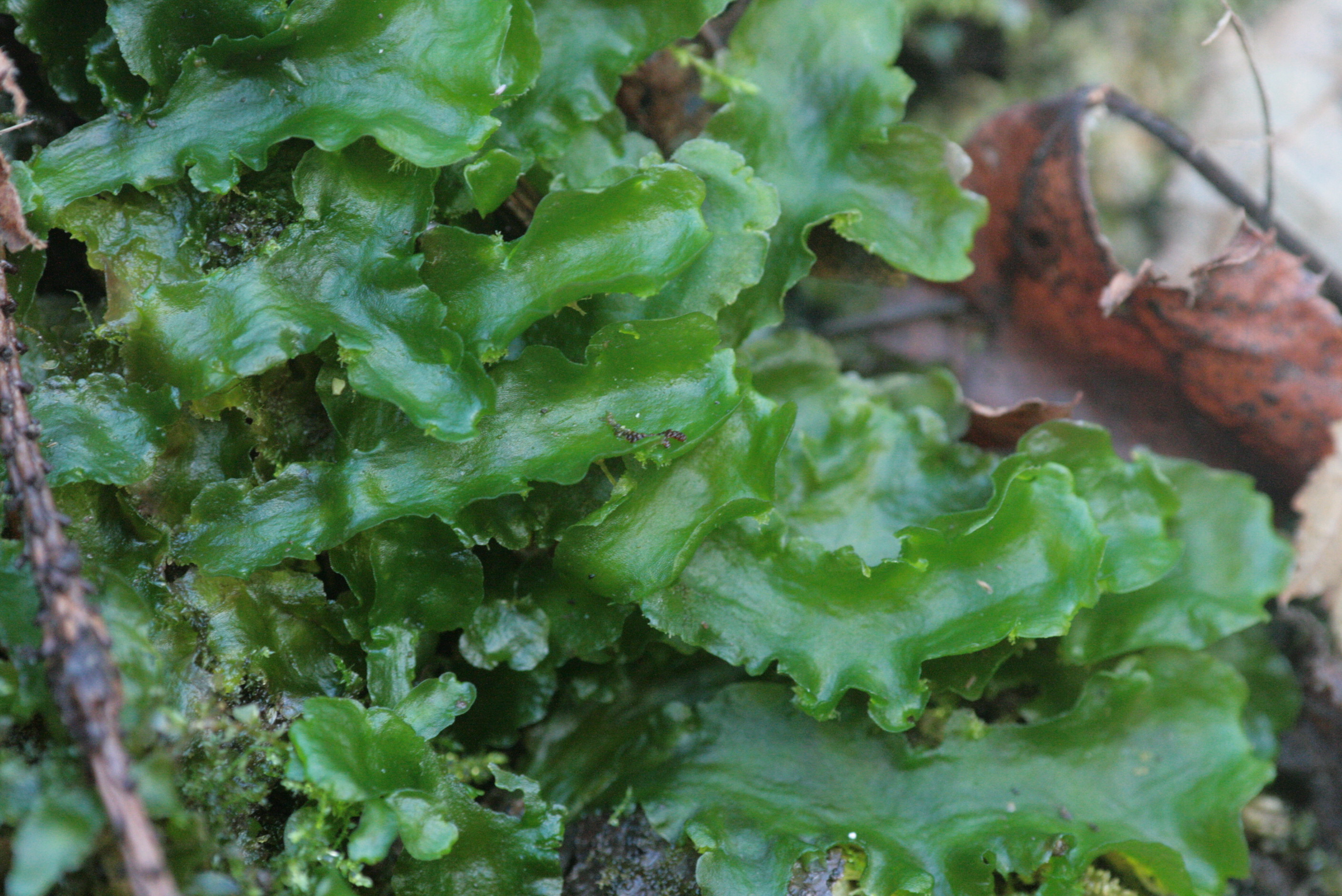

Scientific classification
- Kingdom: Plantae
- Division: Marchantiophyta
- Class: Jungermanniopsida
- Order: Metzgeriales
- Family: Aneuraceae
- Genus: Aneura
- Species: A. pinguis

Binomial name
- Aneura pinguis (L.) Dumort.

= Aneura pinguis =

Species of liverwort

Aneura pinguis is a species of liverworts belonging to the family Aneuraceae. It has a cosmopolitan distribution.
