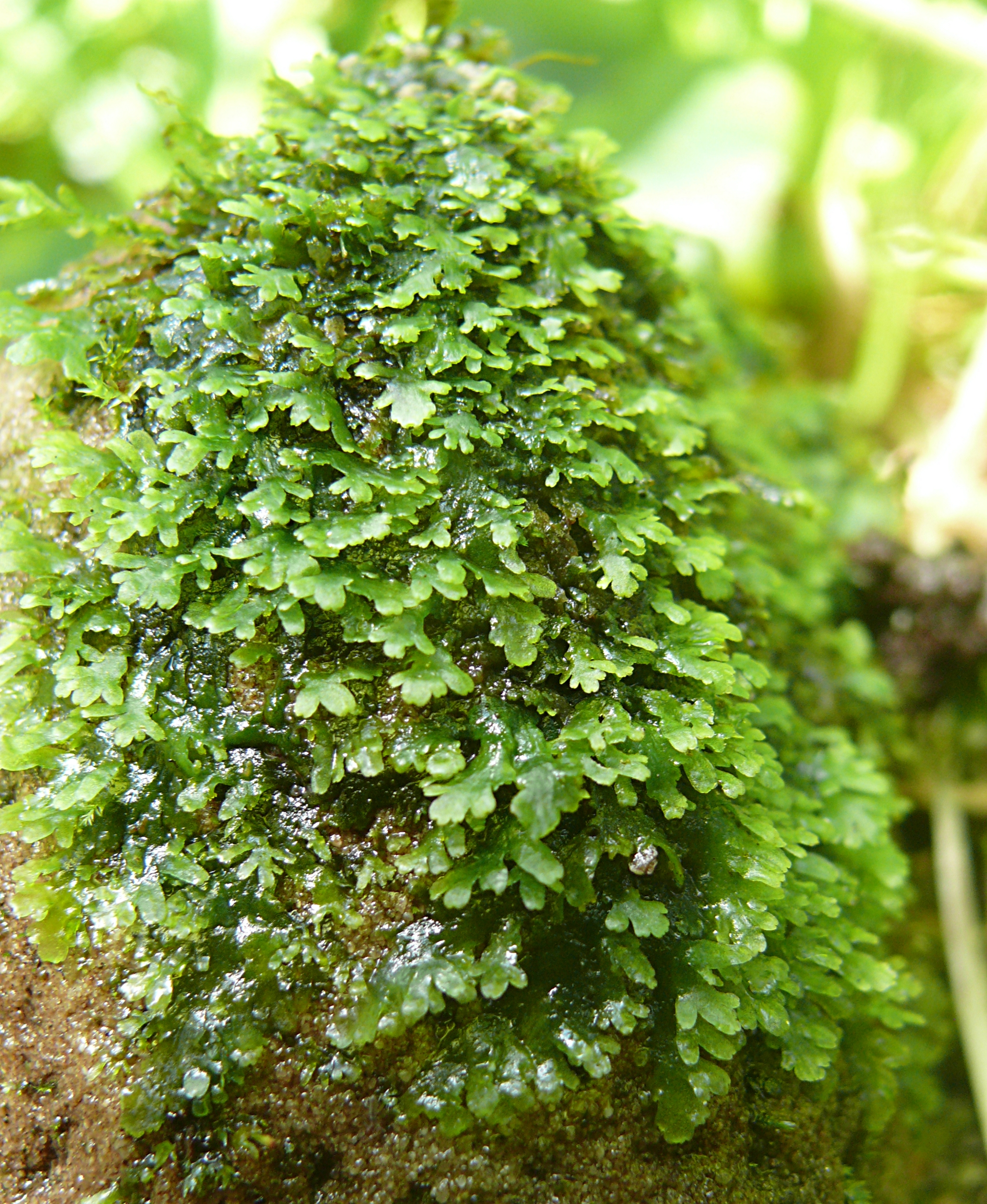
- Riccardia chamedryfolia

Scientific classification
- Kingdom: Plantae
- Division: Marchantiophyta
- Class: Jungermanniopsida
- Order: Metzgeriales
- Family: Aneuraceae
- Genus: Riccardia; Gray

Species
- See text

Synonyms
- List: Pseudoneura Gottsche; Sarcomitrium Corda; Roemeria Raddi; Spinella Schiffn.; Gymnomitrion Huebener

= Riccardia =

Genus of liverworts

Riccardia is a plant genus in the liverwort family Aneuraceae.

== Species ==
As of November, 2024, about 260 species are recognised in the genus Riccardia:

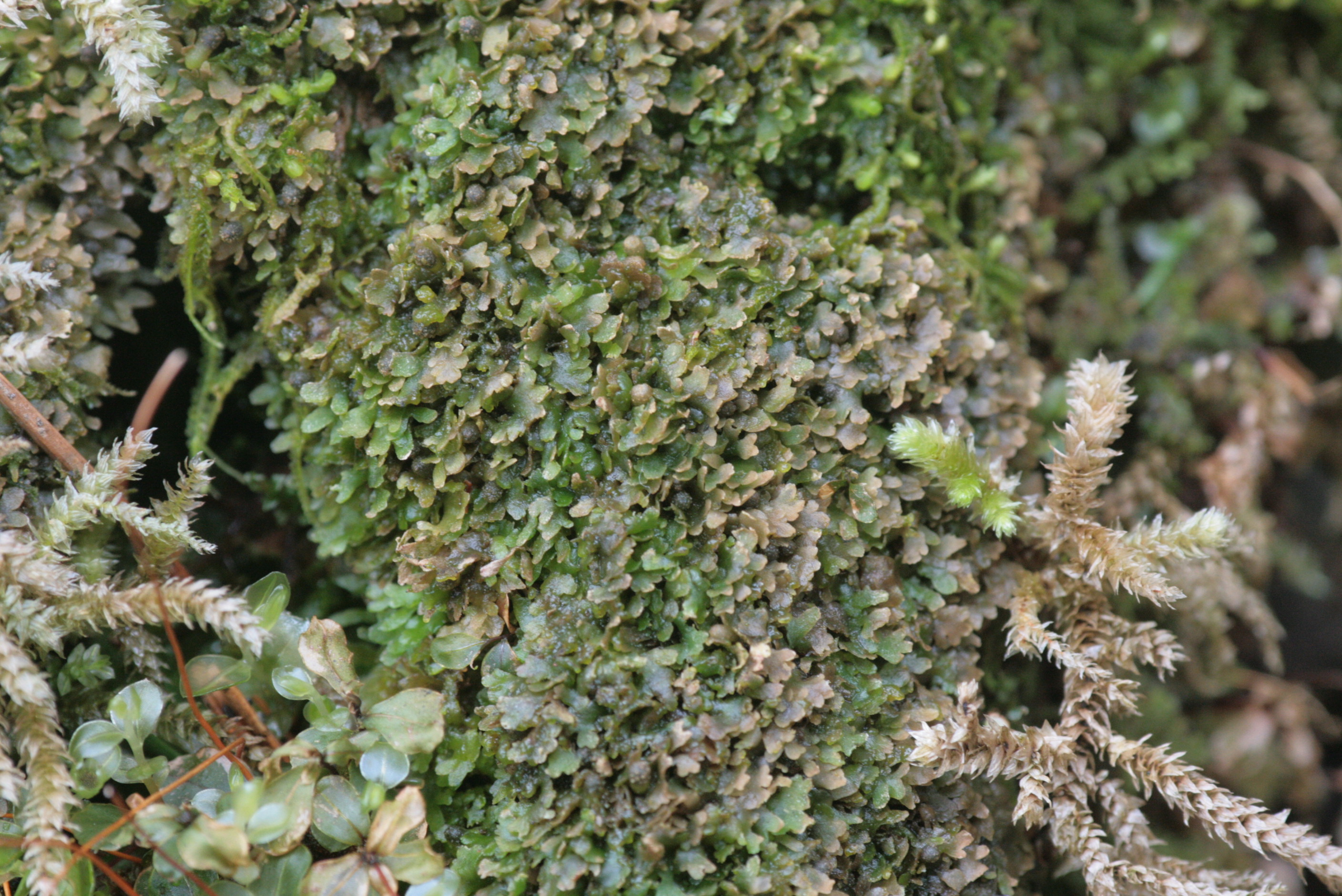
Riccardia latifrons

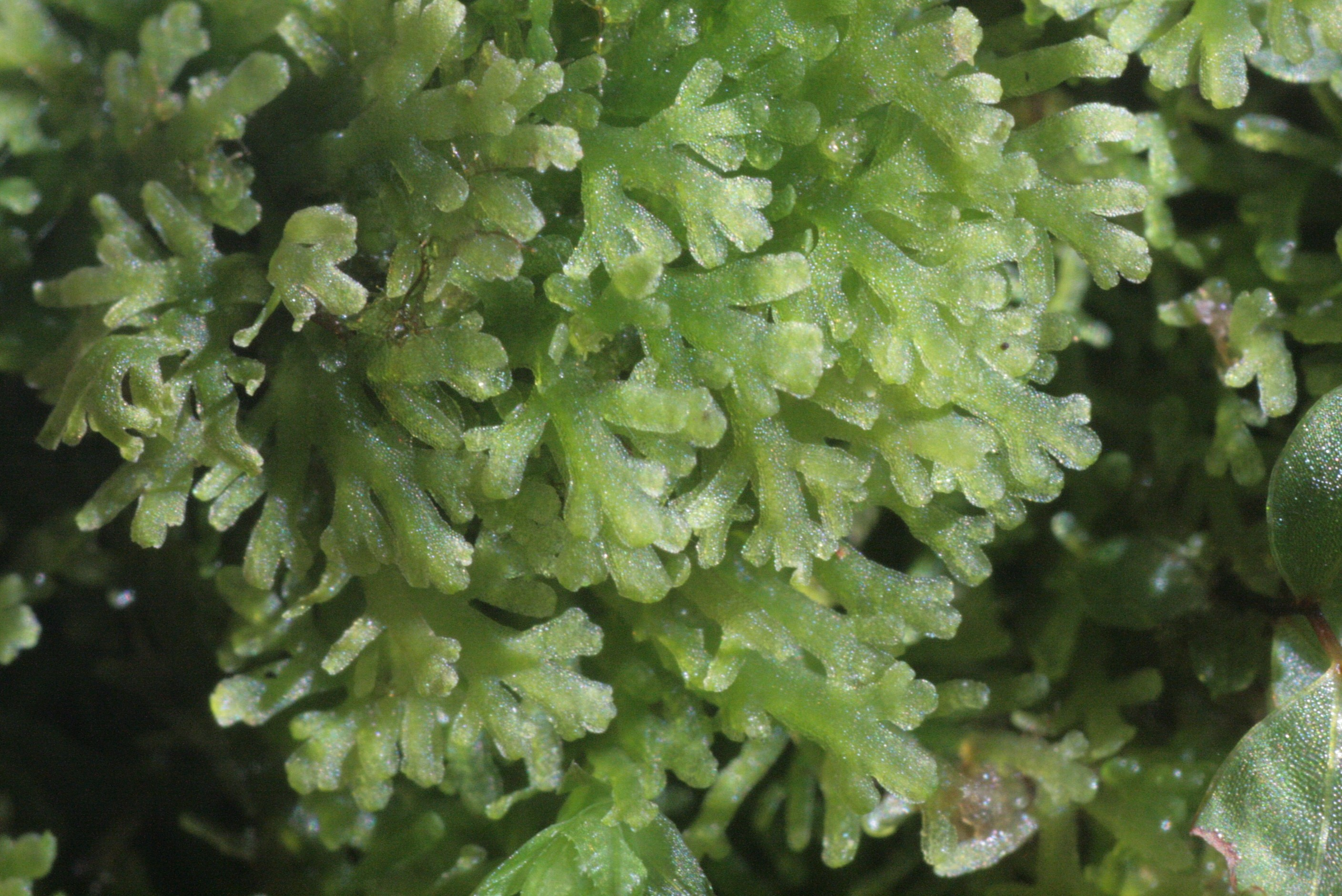
Riccardia multifida

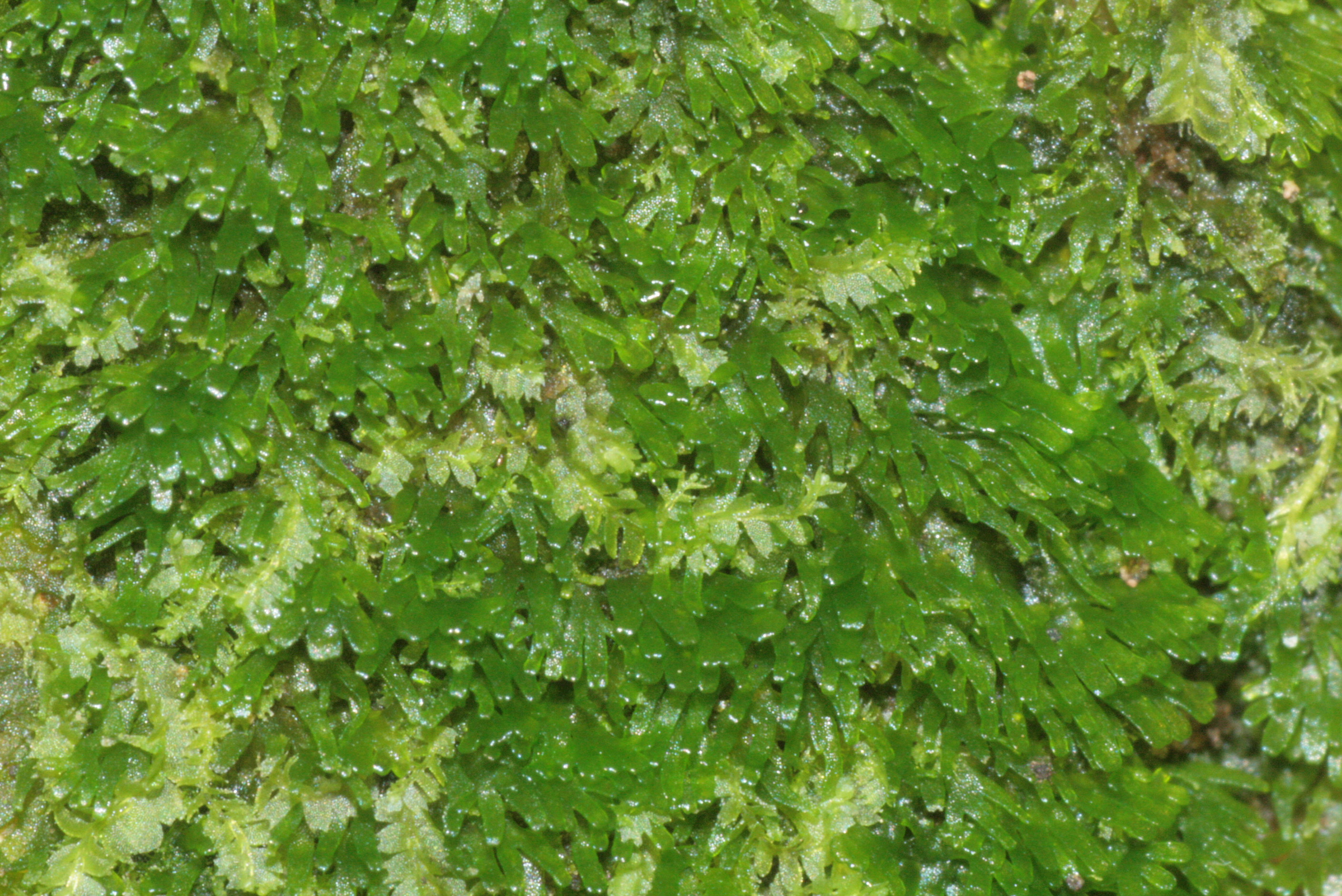
Riccardia palmata

=== A ===
- Riccardia aberrans (Steph.) Gradst.
- Riccardia aequicellularis (Steph.) Hewson
- Riccardia aequitexta (Steph.) E.A.Br.
- Riccardia aeruginosa Furuki
- Riccardia agumana Hewson
- Riccardia alba (Colenso) E.A.Br.
- Riccardia albomarginata (Steph.) Schiffn.
- Riccardia alcicornis (Hook.f. & Taylor) Trevis.
- Riccardia amnicola Hässel
- Riccardia angustata Horik.
- Riccardia anguste-alata (Steph.) Hewson
- Riccardia angusticosta (Steph.) Grolle
- Riccardia angustissima (Steph.) H.A.Mill.
- Riccardia argentolimbata Hewson & Grolle
- Riccardia arcuata Furuki
- Riccardia aspera (Steph.) Grolle
- Riccardia asperulata R.M. Schust.
- Riccardia attenuata (Steph.) H.A. Mill.
- Riccardia australis (Lehm.) Hewson
- Riccardia autoica (Steph.) A.Evans

=== B ===
- Riccardia baldwinii (Steph.) H.A. Mill.
- Riccardia barbiflora (Steph.) Piippo
- Riccardia baumannii Hürl.
- Riccardia bipinnatifida (Colenso) Hewson
- Riccardia bongeriana Hewson
- Riccardia breviala E.A.Br.
- Riccardia breviramosa (Steph.) A.Evans
- Riccardia browniae (A. Hagborg & L. Söderstr.
- Riccardia brunnea (Steph.) S.Hatt.

=== C ===
- Riccardia calva (Schiffn.) A. Evans
- Riccardia campanuliflora S.W. Arnell
- Riccardia canaliculata (Nees) Schiffn.
- Riccardia cardotii (Steph.) S.C.Srivast. & Udar
- Riccardia cataractarum (Spruce) Schiffn.
- Riccardia chamedryfolia (With.) Grolle
- Riccardia changbaishanensis C.Gao
- Riccardia chinensis C.Gao
- Riccardia ciliolata (Spruce) Gradst.
- Riccardia cochleata (Hook. f. & Taylor) Kuntze
- Riccardia colensoi (Steph.) W.Martin
- Riccardia comata (Steph.) H.A.Mill.
- Riccardia comptonii (Pearson) H.A.Mill.
- Riccardia conimitra (Steph.) A. Evans
- Riccardia corbierei (Steph.) Reeb & Gradst.
- Riccardia corralensis (Steph.) A. Evans
- Riccardia costata (Steph.) Hürl.
- Riccardia crassa (Schwägr.) Carrington & Pearson
- Riccardia crassicrispa (Steph.) A. Evans
- Riccardia crassiretis Schiffn.
- Riccardia crenulata Schiffn.
- Riccardia crenuliformis R.M.Schust.

=== D ===
- Riccardia deguchii Furuki & K.T. Yong
- Riccardia densiramea (Steph.) S.Hatt.
- Riccardia devexa Schiffn.
- Riccardia diderma Hässel
- Riccardia digitiloba (Spruce) Pagan
- Riccardia dilatata (Spruce) Schäf.-Verw. & Pócs
- Riccardia diminuta Schiffn.
- Riccardia diversiflora A.Evans
- Riccardia duriuscula Hässel

=== E ===
- Riccardia elata (Steph.) Schiffn.
- Riccardia elegans (Steph.) Hürl.
- Riccardia elisabethae Thouvenot & Reeb
- Riccardia emarginata (Steph.) K.G. Hell
- Riccardia eriocaula (Hook.) Besch. & C. Massal.

=== F ===
- Riccardia falsifloribunda Hässel
- Riccardia fastigiata (Lehm.) Trevis.
- Riccardia filicina (Colenso) E.A.Hodgs.
- Riccardia flaccia (Steph.) S.Hatt.
- Riccardia flaccidissima Schiffn.
- Riccardia flagellaris (A.Gepp) H.A.Mill.
- Riccardia flagellifrons C.Gao
- Riccardia flavovirens Furuki
- Riccardia fleischeri (Steph.) H.A. Mill.
- Riccardia floribunda (Steph.) A.Evans
- Riccardia fluvigena Hässel
- Riccardia formosensis (Steph.) Horik.
- Riccardia fruticosa (Steph.) Furuki
- Riccardia fucoides (Sw.) A.Massal.
- Riccardia fuegiensis C.Massal.
- Riccardia furtiva E.A.Br. & Braggins
- Riccardia fuscobrunnea (Steph.) A.Evans

=== G ===
- Riccardia gaspardii Reeb & Gradst.
- Riccardia geniana Hewson
- Riccardia georgiensis (Steph.) Hässel
- Riccardia glauca Furuki
- Riccardia glaziovii (Spruce) Meenks
- Riccardia gogolensis (Steph.) Hewson
- Riccardia gracilis (Steph.) R.M. Schust.
- Riccardia gradsteinii Pócs
- Riccardia graeffei (Steph.) Hewson
- Riccardia grandiflora (Steph.) H.A. Mill.
- Riccardia granulata (Steph.) A.Evans
- Riccardia grollei Furuki
- Riccardia grossitexta (Steph.) Furuki
- Riccardia gunniana (Steph.) H.A.Mill.

=== H ===
- Riccardia hamatiflora (Steph.) H.A. Mill.
- Riccardia hans-meyeri (Steph.) Meenks & C.De Jong
- Riccardia hattorii Furuki
- Riccardia hawaica (Steph.) H.A. Mill.
- Riccardia hebridensis (Steph.) H.A.Mill.
- Riccardia heteroclada Schiffn.
- Riccardia hirtiflora (Steph.) Schiffn.
- Riccardia humilis (Gottsche) O.Yano
- Riccardia hyalina (Steph.) H.A.Mill.
- Riccardia hyalitricha Hässel
- Riccardia hydra Hürl
- Riccardia hymenophylloides (Spruce) Meenks
- Riccardia hymenophytoides (Spruce) Meenks
- Riccardia hypipamensis Hewson

=== I ===
- Riccardia ibana Hewson
- Riccardia inconspicua (Steph.) Reeb & Bardat
- Riccardia incurvata Lindb.
- Riccardia innovans (Steph.) Pagan
- Riccardia insularis Schiffn.
- Riccardia intercellula E.A.Br.
- Riccardia intricata (Steph.) H.A.Mill.

=== J ===
- Riccardia jackii Schiffn.
- Riccardia jugata R.M.Schust.

=== K ===
- Riccardia karstenii (Steph.) Schiffn.
- Riccardia kodamae Mizut. & S.Hatt.

=== L ===
- Riccardia lachungensis D. Singh & D.K. Singh
- Riccardia laticostata (Spruce) Schiffn.
- Riccardia latifrondoides Schiffn.
- Riccardia latifrons (Lindb.) Lindb.
- Riccardia leptophylla (Spruce) Herzog
- Riccardia leptostachya A.Evans
- Riccardia leptothallus R.M.Schust.
- Riccardia levieri Schiffn.
- Riccardia lichenoides (Steph.) H.A.Mill.
- Riccardia ligulata (Steph.) Pócs & Schäf.-Verw.
- Riccardia lillieana (Steph.) H.A. Mill.
- Riccardia lobulata (Colenso) E.A.Hodgs.
- Riccardia loefgrenii Schiffn.
- Riccardia longiflora (Steph.) Hewson
- Riccardia longioleata Hässel
- Riccardia longispica (Steph.) Pearson
- Riccardia loriana (Steph.) H.A. Mill.

=== M ===
- Riccardia macdonaldiana Hewson
- Riccardia macrantha (Pearson) H.A.Mill.
- Riccardia magnicellularis Furuki
- Riccardia majlandii S.W. Arnell
- Riccardia marginata (Colenso) Pearson
- Riccardia marionensis R.M.Schust.
- Riccardia martinii Reeb & Gradst.
- Riccardia meagheri Frank Müll.
- Riccardia microscopica (Nees) Kuntze
- Riccardia minuta (Steph.) W. Martin
- Riccardia multicorpora E.A.Br.
- Riccardia multifida (L.) Gray
- Riccardia multifidoides Schiffn.
- Riccardia multioleata Hässel
- Riccardia multispica (Steph.) S.Hatt.
- Riccardia mycophora A.Evans

=== N ===
- Riccardia nadeaudii (Steph.) Hürl.
- Riccardia nagasakiensis (Steph.) S.Hatt.
- Riccardia nana (Hook.f. & Taylor) Trevis.
- Riccardia negeri (Steph.) A. Evans
- Riccardia newellana (Steph.) H.A. Mill.
- Riccardia nigra (Steph.) H.A. Mill.
- Riccardia nitida (Colenso) E.A.Hodgs.
- Riccardia nobilis (Steph.) Schiffn.
- Riccardia novo-amstelodamensis Schiffn.

=== O ===
- Riccardia obtusifrons (Steph.) H.A. Mill.
- Riccardia omkaliensis Hewson
- Riccardia opuntiiformis S.W.Arnell

=== P ===
- Riccardia pallida (Spruce) Meenks & C.De Jong
- Riccardia pallidevirens (Steph.) A.Evans
- Riccardia palmata (Hedw.) Carruth.
- Riccardia palmatifida (Steph.) H.A.Mill.
- Riccardia papillata (Gottsche) Hässel
- Riccardia papulosa (Steph.) E.A.Br.
- Riccardia parvula Schiffn.
- Riccardia patens Hässel
- Riccardia pauciramea R.M.Schust.
- Riccardia paulensis Schiffn.
- Riccardia pectinata (Austin) H.A.Mill.
- Riccardia pellucida Piippo
- Riccardia pembaiensis (Steph.) Hürl.
- Riccardia pengagensis Hewson
- Riccardia pennata E.A.Br.
- Riccardia perspicua E.A.Br.
- Riccardia perssonii S.C.Srivast. & Udar
- Riccardia philippinensis Furuki
- Riccardia phleganiana Hewson
- Riccardia pindaundensis Hewson
- Riccardia pindensis Hewson
- Riccardia plana (Steph.) Hürl.
- Riccardia planiflora (Steph.) S.Hatt.
- Riccardia plumosa (Mitt.) E.O.Campb.
- Riccardia poeppigiana (Lehm. & Lindenb.) Hässel
- Riccardia polyclada (Mitt.) Hässel
- Riccardia porcina (Hewson) L. Söderstr.
- Riccardia portoricensis (Steph.) Pagan
- Riccardia prehensilis (Hook.f. & Taylor) C.Massal.
- Riccardia pseudodendroceros R.M.Schust.
- Riccardia pseudodendroceros R.M. Schust. ex M.A.M. Renner
- Riccardia pumila Furuki
- Riccardia punahuina (Steph.) H.A. Mill.
- Riccardia pusilla Grolle

=== R ===
- Riccardia ramosissima (Steph.) Grolle
- Riccardia regnellii (Ångstr.) K.G. Hell
- Riccardia regularis (Steph.) Kuhnem.
- Riccardia reyesiana Meenks
- Riccardia riccioides Pearson
- Riccardia rigida Schiffn.
- Riccardia rivularis Hässel
- Riccardia robbinsii Hewson & Grolle
- Riccardia robusta (Steph.) H.A.Mill.
- Riccardia rockii (Steph.) H.A.Mill.
- Riccardia rupicola (Steph.) Hewson
- Riccardia russellii R.M.Schust.

=== S ===
- Riccardia saccatiflora (Steph.) S.W.Arnell
- Riccardia santapaui Udar & K.P. Srivast.
- Riccardia saxicola Hässel
- Riccardia schwaneckei (Steph.) Pagan
- Riccardia sikkimensis (Steph.) S.C. Srivast. & Udar
- Riccardia singapurensis Schiffn.
- Riccardia spectabilis (Steph.) A.Evans
- Riccardia spegazziniana A.Massal.
- Riccardia spinulifera A.Massal.
- Riccardia spongiosa Furuki
- Riccardia squamifera Schiffn.
- Riccardia statensis Hässel
- Riccardia stipatiflora (Steph.) Pagan
- Riccardia stricta R.M.Schust.
- Riccardia subalpina Furuki
- Riccardia subantarctica R.M. Schust. ex Grolle & L. Söderstr.
- Riccardia subexalata Schiffn.
- Riccardia submersa Horik.
- Riccardia submultifida Horik.
- Riccardia subpalmata (Steph.) Hürl.
- Riccardia sumatrana Schiffn.

=== T ===
- Riccardia tenax (Steph.) A.Evans
- Riccardia tenella Hewson
- Riccardia tenerrima (Steph.) A. Evans
- Riccardia tenuifrons (Steph.) Schiffn. ex O. Yano
- Riccardia tenuis (Steph.) Schiffn.
- Riccardia thaxteri A. Evans
- Riccardia theliophora Hässel
- Riccardia tjibodensis Schiffn.
- Riccardia tristaniana S.W. Arnell
- Riccardia trukensis H.A. Mill. & Bonner
- Riccardia tumbareriensis Hewson

=== U ===
- Riccardia udarii D. Singh & D.K. Singh
- Riccardia umida E.A.Br.
- Riccardia upoluna (Steph.) Grolle

=== V ===
- Riccardia valida (Steph.) J.J.Engel
- Riccardia venosa (Steph.) Hürl.
- Riccardia verticillata Gradst. & Reeb
- Riccardia villosa (Steph.) S.C.Srivast. & Udar
- Riccardia virens (Steph.) Hürl.
- Riccardia vitrea Furuki
- Riccardia vohimanensis Reeb & Gradst.

=== W ===
- Riccardia wallisii (Steph.) Gradst.
- Riccardia wettsteinii Schiffn.
- Riccardia womersleyana Hewson

=== X ===
- Riccardia xylophila Hässel
