= Helen P. Ramsay =

Australian bryologist

Helen Patricia Ramsay
- Born: 2 September 1928 (age 98)
- Education: University of Sydney
- Known for: cytology, taxonomy and distribution studies
- Spouse: Frank
- Children: 3
- Scientific career
- Fields: Bryology
- Workplaces: University of New South Wales

Helen P. Ramsay is an Australian bryologist specialising in cytology and taxonomy.

== Education and personal life ==
Helen Patricia Ramsay was born 2 September 1928. She received her doctorate on bryophyte genetics from the University of Sydney in 1966. By this time she was married to Frank (died 2003) and they had 3 children together.

== Botanical career ==
In 1966 she had a Leverhulme postdoctoral fellowship at Bangor University, Wales, working on meiotic cell division in bryophytes in the laboratory of Professor Paul Richards. At the time, the department was one of the leaders in bryology research in the UK. In 1968 she was appointed as a tutor in botany, University of New South Wales, and was later promoted to senior lecturer. She remained there until she retired in 1984. However, her active fieldwork of collecting and recording moss continued. From 1985 until the early 2000s she substantially extended the collection in the National Herbarium of New South Wales of bryophytes from the Blue Mountains.

Her research focused on cytology, taxonomy and distribution checklists, particularly of the moss families Bryaceae, Sematophyllaceae and Macromitrium. She recorded distributions of the mosses of New South Wales, the Australian Capital Territory and Lord Howe Island as well as carefully cataloguing and storing the herbarium material.

Ramsay was co-editor of the Australasian Bryological Newsletter from 1979 until 1991.

The Chatham Islands endemic moss species Macromitrium ramsayae is named after Ramsay.

== Publications ==
Ramsay was the author of more than 65 scientific publications and book chapters. These included:

- Ramsay, H., 'History of research on Australian mosses' in Flora of Australia volume 51 (Mosses 1), McCarthy, P. M., ed. (Canberra & Melbourne: CSIRO Publishing, 2006), pp. 1–19.
- Ramsay H.P. (2011) Australian Mosses – New chromosome numbers and compilation of chromosome data. Telopea 13 (3): 577-619.
- Ramsay, H.P., Schofield, W.B., & Tan, B.C. 2002. The genus Taxithelium (Bryopsida, Sematophyllaceae) in Australia. Aust. Syst. Bot., 15 (4): 683-596
- Ramsay, H.P., Streimann, H., & Vitt, D.H. 1995. Cytological studies on mosses from Papua New Guinea I. Introduction and the family Orthotrichaceae. Tropical Bryology 11: 151-160
- Ramsay, H.P. (1985) Cytological and sexual characteristics of the moss Dicranoloma Ren. Monographs in Systematic Botany 11: 93-110
- Ramsay, H. (1984) Census of New South Wales Mosses, Telopea, 2 (5) 455-533
- Ramsay, H.P. (1974) Cytological studies of Australian mosses. Aust. J. Bot., 22 (2): 293-348
- Ramsay, H.P. (1969) Cytological studies of mosses from the British Isles. Bot. J. Linn. Soc. 62: 85-121
- Ramsay, H.P. (1966) Sex chromosomes in Macromitrium. Bryologist 69: 293-311

Australian moss specimens that she collected are in the National Herbarium of New South Wales. The John Ray Herbarium at the University of New South Wales contains the liverworts from her doctoral research.

== Awards and honours ==
Ramsay was appointed Member of the Order of Australia in 2019 for her service to plant science.
