= Elizabeth Brown (botanist) =

Australian botanist

- Born: Elizabeth Anne Brown; 15 November 1956; Auckland, New Zealand
- Died: 17 November 2013 (aged 57); Tahmoor, New South Wales, Australia
- Education: University of Auckland
- Relatives: John Brown (father)
- Scientific career
- Fields: Bryology, systematics
- Thesis: Studies in the New Zealand Aneuraceae (1987)
- Doctoral advisor: John E. Braggins

Elizabeth Anne Brown (15 November 1956 – 17 November 2013) was a New Zealand-born Australian bryologist who primarily contributed to the systematics of liverworts.

== Early life and education ==
Brown was born in Auckland, New Zealand, on 15 November 1956. Her father, John Brown (1928–2005), was a lecturer of plant physiology at the University of Auckland and a Test cricket umpire. Her mother was Barbara Brown (née Bray, 1929–1998). After attending Epsom Girls' Grammar School, she went on to study at the University of Auckland between 1975 and 1987. Her Master's and doctoral research, under the supervision of Dr John E. Braggins, focused on the systematics of the liverwort genera Marchantia and Riccardia, respectively. The title of her 1987 doctoral thesis was Studies in the New Zealand Aneuraceae.

== Career and later life ==
In 1989, Brown moved to New South Wales, Australia, to undertake a research fellowship at the National Herbarium of New South Wales. In 1993, she was appointed as a scientific officer, and later as systematic bryologist in 2000. Her appointment was supported by Helen P. Ramsay. Brown was also a lecturer at both the University of New England and the University of Sydney. Additionally, she was an editor for the plant systematics journal Telopea.

Brown described several species of plants, including those from the Dracophyllum, Lissanthe, and Riccardia genera.

Brown died of liver cancer on 17 November 2013 at Tahmoor, New South Wales, at the age of 57.

== Selected works ==
=== Theses ===
- Brown, Elizabeth A. (1981). Some studies in the New Zealand Targioniinae and Marchantiinae (Hepaticae) (MSc). University of Auckland.
- Brown, Elizabeth A. (1987). Studies in the New Zealand Aneuraceae (PhD). University of Auckland.

=== Journal articles ===
- Brown, Elizabeth A.; Braggins, John E. (1989). "A revision of the genus Riccardia S.F.Gray in New Zealand with notes on the genus Aneura Dum". Journal of the Hattori Botanical Laboratory. 66: 1–132.
- Renner, Matt A. M.; Devos, Nicolas; Patiño, Jairo; Brown, Elizabeth A.; Orme, Andrew; Elgey, Michael; Wilson, Trevor C.; Gray, Lindsey J.; von Konrat, Matt J. (2013). "Integrative taxonomy resolves the cryptic and pseudo-cryptic Radula buccinifera complex (Porellales, Jungermanniopsida), including two reinstated and five new species". PhytoKeys (27): 1–113. doi:10.3897/phytokeys.27.5523. PMC 3821098. PMID 24223490.

The standard author abbreviation E.A.Br. is used to indicate this person as the author when citing a botanical name.
