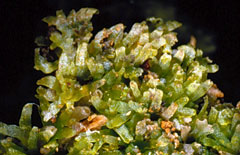
- Riccardia palmata

Scientific classification
- Kingdom: Plantae
- Division: Marchantiophyta
- Class: Jungermanniopsida
- Order: Metzgeriales
- Family: Aneuraceae; H.Klinggr.

Genera
- Aneura; Lobatoriccardia; Riccardia; Verdoornia

Synonyms
- Riccardiaceae

= Aneuraceae =

Family of liverworts

Aneuraceae (sometimes Riccardiaceae) is a family of thallose liverworts in the order Metzgeriales. Most species are very small with narrow, branching thalli.

== Taxonomy ==
Aneuraceae is the largest family in the order Metzgeriales, simple thalloid liverworts. The number of species listed is considered to be inflated because of a high level of synonymy, and might be reduced from about 300 to about 100 if the family were revised. Species are difficult to delimit because nearly all are morphologically highly variable. Genetic studies suggest that some, such as Aneura pinguis, include morphologically cryptic species.

A molecular phylogenetic study in 2010 produced a cladogram showing the relationships among the four genera placed in the family Aneuraceae:

- Aneuraceae
  - Riccardia
  - - Verdoornia (only species Verdoornia succulenta)
    - - Lobatiriccardia
      - Aneura (including former Cryptothallus)
