= Neotrichocoleaceae =

Scientific classification
- Kingdom: Plantae
- Division: Marchantiophyta
- Class: Jungermanniopsida
- Order: Ptilidiales
- Family: Neotrichocoleaceae; Inoue, 1974

Genera
- Neotrichocolea; Trichocoleopsis

Family of liverworts

Neotrichocoleaceae is a family of liverworts in order Ptilidiales. It is closely related to the genera Ptilidium and Herzogianthus.

== Phylogeny ==
- - - - - Leafy II (2600 spp)
        - - Ptilidium
          - Neotrichocoleaceae
            - Neotrichocolea
            - Trichocoleopsis
      - Leafy I (1800 spp)
  - - - Pleurozia
      - Metzgeriales

The diagram at left summarizes a portion of a 2006 cladistic analysis of liverworts based upon three chloroplast genes, one nuclear gene, and one mitochondrial gene. The genus Trichocoleopsis was not included in the original broad analysis, but it is the sister taxon of Neotrichocolea according to a more narrowly focussed study utilizing six chloroplast genes, two nuclear genes, and a mitochondrial gene.

The genus Ptilidium is sister to the Trichocoleopsis-Neotrichocolea clade. The genus Herzogianthus is also believed to be related to this group, although it was not included in either molecular analysis. This combined clade, in turn, attaches at the base of a large clade (2600 species) designated "Leafy II". That clade, together with "Leafy I" (another 1800 species) and Pleurozia constitute the Jungermanniales, as traditionally defined.
