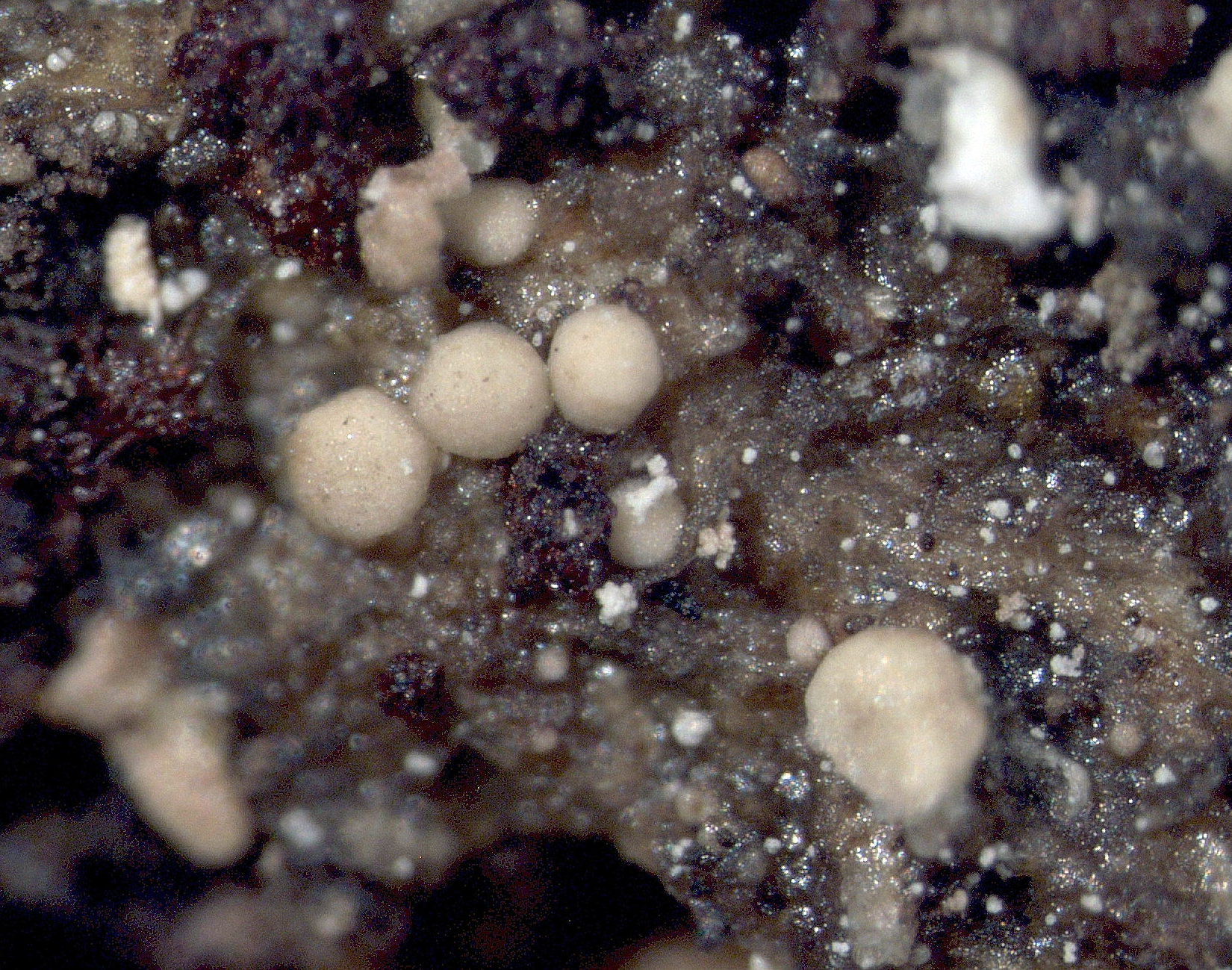
- Puttea margaritella

Scientific classification
- Kingdom: Fungi
- Division: Ascomycota
- Class: Lecanoromycetes
- Order: Lecanorales
- Genus: Puttea; S.Stenroos & Huhtinen (2009)

Type species
- Puttea margaritella (Hulting) S.Stenroos & Huhtinen (2009)

Species
- P. caesia P. duplex P. exsequens P. margaritella

= Puttea =

Genus of lichens

Puttea is a genus of lichen-forming fungi with uncertain familial placement in the order Lecanorales. The genus comprises four species. Finnish lichenologists Soili Stenroos and Seppo Huhtinen established the genus Puttea in 2009 for the lichen species formerly known as Lecidea margaritella, which has undergone various reclassifications. Molecular phylogenetics analyses have shown that Puttea margaritella does not align closely with genera like Fellhanera or Micarea, but its precise familial placement remains uncertain. Puttea is characterized by an indistinct, lichenized thallus composed of delicate fungal filaments and small algal cells. Its minute, round, whitish apothecia (fruiting bodies) lack a distinct margin, and the asci, or spore-producing cells, are thick-walled, club-shaped, and contain eight spores, showing specific reactions with iodine-based stains. The type species of the genus, Puttea margaritella, typically inhabits boreal forests, growing on the liverwort species Ptilidium pulcherrimum and sometimes on decaying wood or bark. Initially thought to be confined to Europe, it has since been found in North America, particularly in Alaska and Québec, extending its known range. The species is parasitic, damaging its host, and is considered rare within its distribution.

== Systematics ==
=== Historical taxonomy ===
The Finnish lichenologists Soili Stenroos and Seppo Huhtinen erected the genus Puttea in 2009 to accommodate the lichen species formerly known as Lecidea margaritella. Over the years, this species has been classified under various names. Johan Hulting first described it as Lecidea margaritella in 1910. Subsequent revisions saw it placed in different genera, including Agyrium hepaticola by Keissler (1921) and Lecidea symmictella var. albida by Vainio (1934). A modern revision by Josef Poelt and Döbbeler in 1975 retained it in Lecidea but suggested it might be closer to the genus Micarea. It was later reclassified as Fellhanera margaritella by Josef Hafellner in 2001 without comprehensive justification, leaving its systematic position ambiguous until the establishment of the new genus Puttea.

The name Puttea originates from the Finnish research program "PUTTE", which focussed on poorly known and threatened forest species from 2003 to 2007. The program, launched by the Finnish Ministry of Environment, provided significant funding for taxonomic research in Finland, which facilitated the study and classification of this genus.

=== Phylogenetics ===
Phylogenetic analyses, including DNA sequencing of mitochondrial small subunit ribosomal DNA (mtSSU rDNA), were crucial in recognizing Puttea as a distinct genus. These analyses revealed that Puttea margaritella does not closely align with genera such as Fellhanera or Micarea, despite morphological similarities. Instead, Puttea appears to be related to the clade containing the families Sphaerophoraceae, Psoraceae, Ramalinaceae, and Ectolechiaceae. However, the exact familial placement of Puttea remains unresolved due to insufficient backbone support in the phylogenetic trees. Further genetic studies involving additional loci are needed to clarify its systematic affinities.

== Description ==
Puttea is characterized by its lichenized thallus, which is indistinct and not compact. The thallus consists of a thin layer of delicate fungal filaments (hyphae) and small algal cells.

The apothecia (fruiting bodies) are minute, round, and whitish. They have a convex shape and lack a distinct margin (immarginate). The outer layer of the apothecia (excipulum) consists of parallel, gelatinized hyphae with narrow lumina running perpendicular to the surface, while the inner layer is composed of a gelatinized network (textura intricata).

The asci, or spore-producing cells, are club-shaped (clavate), thick-walled, and contain eight spores. They show faint amyloid reactions with Melzer's reagent (MLZ) and strong hemiamyloid reactions with iodine potassium iodide (IKI). The asci have a blue-staining central area (tholus) with an outer brownish reaction and originate from specialized structures called croziers. Pre-treatment with potassium hydroxide solution reveals a canal penetrating the tholus, which is surrounded by darker blue walls when stained with IKI. Both the spore-bearing layer (hymenium) and the sides of the apothecia are covered with a narrow gelatinous layer topped with crystals that dissolve in most chemical reagents.

The paraphyses, or sterile filaments interspersed among the asci, are colourless (hyaline), cylindrical, branched, and interconnected (anastomosing). They are of even length with the asci. The ascospores are also hyaline, thin-walled, smooth, ellipsoid to somewhat spindle-shaped (subfusoid), and lack internal divisions (aseptate). They contain prominent vacuolar remains that are visible in most reagents.

== Habitat and distribution ==
The type species, Puttea margaritella, typically inhabits boreal and oroboreal forests, particularly in moist niches that suit the habitat requirements of its liverwort host. It primarily grows on the species Ptilidium pulcherrimum, and sometimes on adjacent surfaces such as decaying wood or bark. This lichen species is parasitic, visibly harming its host, with its reproductive structures (ascomata) developing only on decaying shoots of the liverwort.

The distribution of Puttea margaritella was initially believed to be relatively restricted, primarily confined to Europe. It had been recorded in various regions including Austria, Czech Republic, Finland, Norway, Poland, Russia, Slovakia, Sweden, and Switzerland. In Alaska, collections have recorded it growing on the liverwort Ptilidium californicum. The discovery of Puttea margaritella in North America significantly extended its known range; it has now been documented in the boreal and moist forest regions of Québec, Canada, and has been confirmed to grow on decaying liverworts, particularly in high-altitude spruce forests. The identification of Puttea exsequens in New Brunswick expands the genus's distribution beyond its known European and Asian locations.

Although its host, Ptilidium pulcherrimum, is widely distributed across Europe, North America, and Asia, Puttea margaritella has a much more restricted range and is rarely reported outside of Europe. It is considered rare within its known range. In Poland, P. margaritella has also been found on dead Lophocolea heterophylla, suggesting some flexibility in host choice.

== Species ==
- Puttea caesia (Fr.) M.Svenss. & T.Sprib. (2012)
- Puttea duplex (Coppins & Aptroot) M.Svenss. (2017)
- Puttea exsequens (Nyl.) Printzen & Davydov (2012)
- Puttea margaritella (Hulting) S.Stenroos & Huhtinen (2009)
