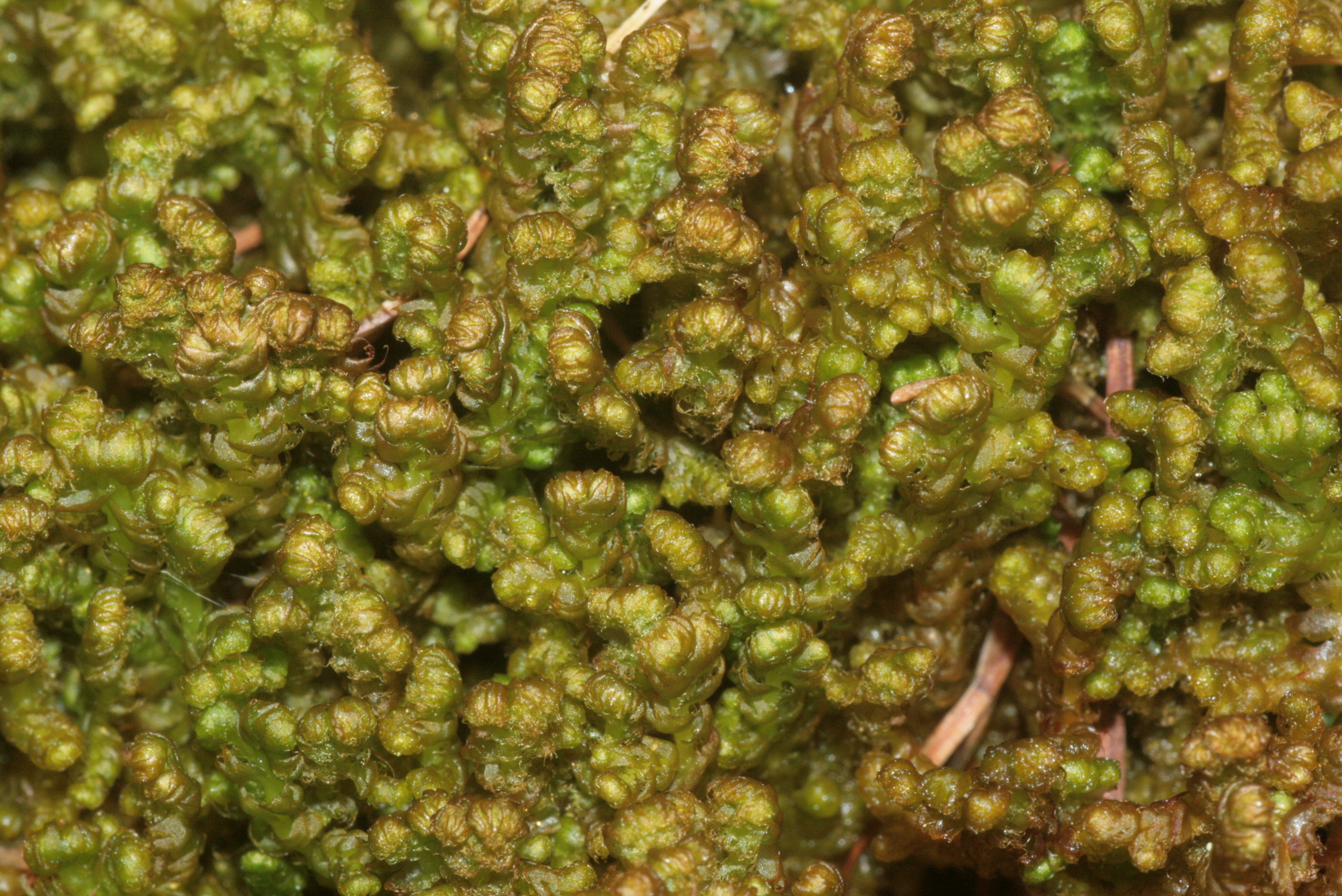
- A clump of Ptilidium ciliare, the individual ciliated leaves not easily visible in this picture.

Scientific classification
- Kingdom: Plantae
- Division: Marchantiophyta
- Class: Jungermanniopsida
- Order: Ptilidiales
- Family: Ptilidiaceae
- Genus: Ptilidium
- Species: P. ciliare

Binomial name
- Ptilidium ciliare (L.) Hampe

Synonyms
- Blepharozia ciliaris (L.) Dumort; Jungermannia ciliaris L.

= Ptilidium ciliare =

Species of liverwort

Ptilidium ciliare is a liverwort with the common names ciliated fringewort and northern naugehyde liverwort. It is widespread in Canada, Alaska, the northeastern United States, Greenland, Iceland, and northern Europe occasionally as far south as northern Italy.

== Description ==
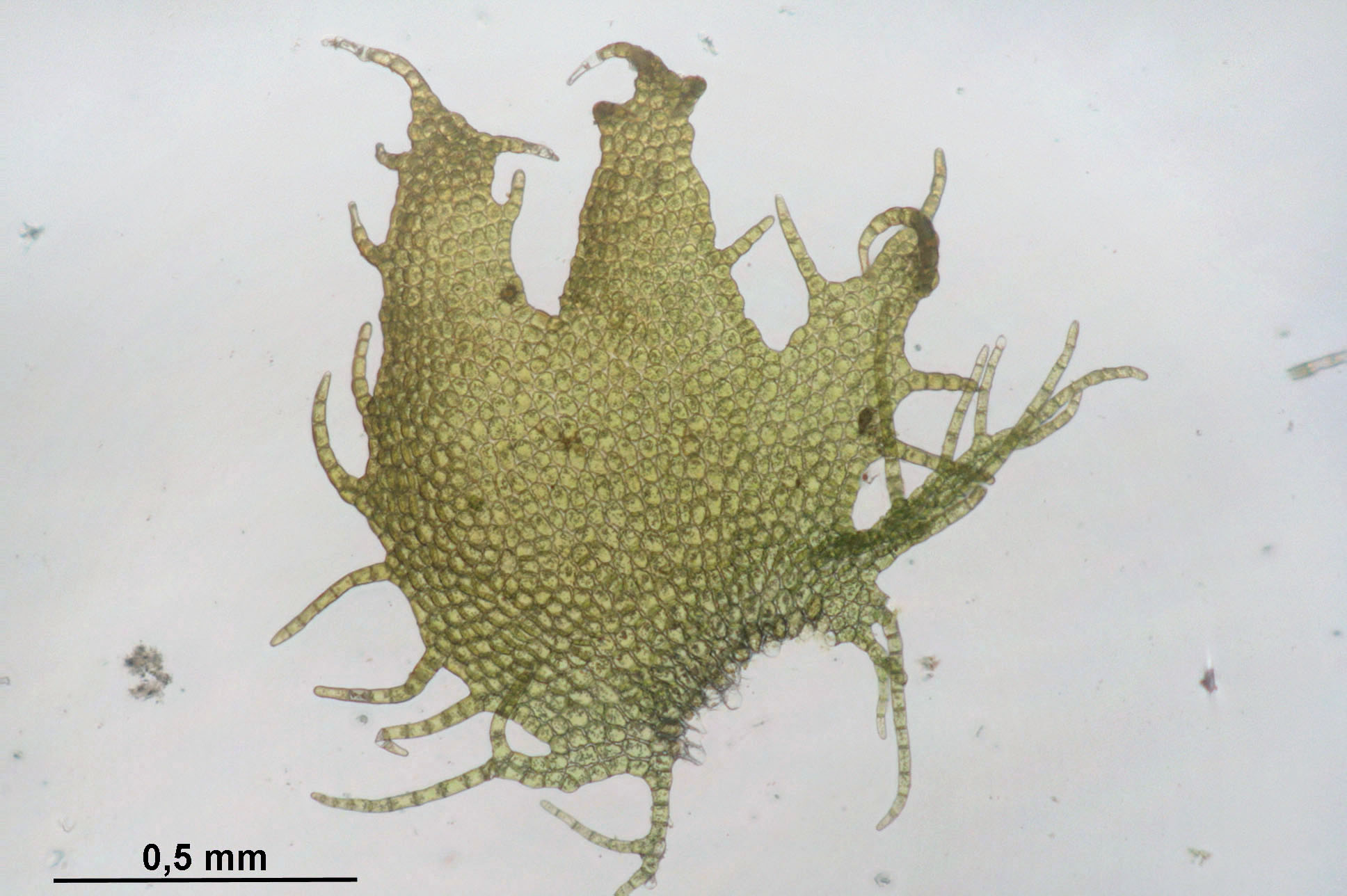
An individual leaf of P. ciliare seen under a microscope, with the fringing cilia clearly visible.

Ptilidium ciliare grows in loose, reddish-brown to yellow-green tufts, with individual shoots up to 3 mm wide. Its stems are pinnate or bipinnate, with short stubby branching clusters of dense overlapping leaves covering its stem. The leaves are up to 2.8 mm wide and 2.3 mm long, and the leaves are finely serrated or ciliated, the margins extended as fringe-like rows of thin teeth. The teeth make it difficult to see that the leaves are bilobed. Sexual reproductive structures are very rarely observed on this species.

== Habitat ==
Ptilidium ciliare is commonly found in lowland to upland habitats such as acidic grassland, rocky slopes, cliff ledges, screes, wall tops, dwarf shrub heaths, bogs, sand dunes and heathy woodlands. It is usually seen growing amongst a mixture of other bryophyte species. Well-drained and acidic substrates are the preferred growth medium of this species. It rarely grows on fallen logs and branches.

== Similar species ==
Stunted forms of P. ciliare could be mistaken for the species P. pulcherrimum, but P. pulcherrimum is smaller, and more compact, almost always growing closely to bark. Mastigophora woodsii is a more robust plant, with longer, attenuated branches on which the leaf size gradually tapers towards the tips.
