= Puttea duplex =

Scientific classification
- Kingdom: Fungi
- Division: Ascomycota
- Class: Lecanoromycetes
- Order: Lecanorales
- Genus: Puttea
- Species: P. duplex

Binomial name
- Puttea duplex (Coppins & Aptroot) M.Svenss. (2017)

Synonyms
- Fellhanera duplex Coppins & Aptroot (2008)

Species of lichen

Puttea duplex is a species of lichen of uncertain familial placement in the order Lecanorales. This tiny, inconspicuous lichen forms pale greyish films over decaying moss on tree bark and produces extremely small, yellowish-brown disc-shaped fruiting bodies that are barely visible to the naked eye. It is distinguished from similar species by having an unusually large number of ascospores (16–24) packed into each spore sac, compared to the typical eight found in related lichens.

== Taxonomy ==
Fellhanera duplex was described as new to science in 2008 by Brian J. Coppins and André Aptroot during work for a revised edition of Lichens of the British Isles. The holotype was collected in Wales (Cardiganshire) in 2001 from the trunk of Quercus petraea, where it grew over a tassel of the moss Hypnum. The species was segregated from similar Fellhanera on the basis of its unusually many-spored asci and very small, simple spores. The authors suggested a close resemblance to F. margaritella, but that species has only eight ascospores per ascus and larger, narrower spores.

The species was moved from Fellhanera to Puttea after comparison of its microscopic features with those that define Puttea: the minute, pale apothecia; asci whose tip shows a strong iodine-blue reaction with a tiny canal; abundant crystals in the fruiting layer that dissolve in K; and a strongly gelatinised apothecial rim built from branched, parallel hyphae. Within Puttea it is distinctive in having 16–24 spores per ascus (the type of Puttea, P. margaritella, has 8).

== Description ==
The thallus is very thin and inconspicuous, forming a pale grey to brownish film over decaying moss on bark. Apothecia (disc-like fruiting bodies) are tiny—typically 0.15–0.2 mm across—pale yellowish-brown and flat, with a margin similar in colour to the disc. Microscopically, the exciple (the apothecial rim) is nearly colourless; the spore-bearing layer has branched, interwoven paraphyses; and the asci are of the Ectolechiaceae type, each usually containing 16–24 spores. The spores (ascospores) are colourless, simple (without cross-walls), broadly ellipsoid and very small, about (2.5–)3–4(–5) × 2–2.3 μm. No asexual fruiting bodies (pycnidia) have been observed, and thin-layer chromatography detected no lichen products. In the field it can be mistaken for a pale-fruited Micarea, but the many-spored asci and very small, simple spores distinguish it.

== Habitat and distribution ==
Originally described from the British Isles (Scotland, Wales), where it grows on bleached, decaying moss on tree trunks, the species is now confirmed from Fennoscandia. It was reported from Norway and then newly recorded for Sweden, where it was found on the bark of birch in mature coniferous forest. The Swedish find, occurring directly on bark rather than only over bryophytes, suggests the species' substrate range is broader than first thought. Current distribution therefore includes the UK, Norway and Sweden, and it is plausibly overlooked elsewhere in oceanic to suboceanic woodland.
