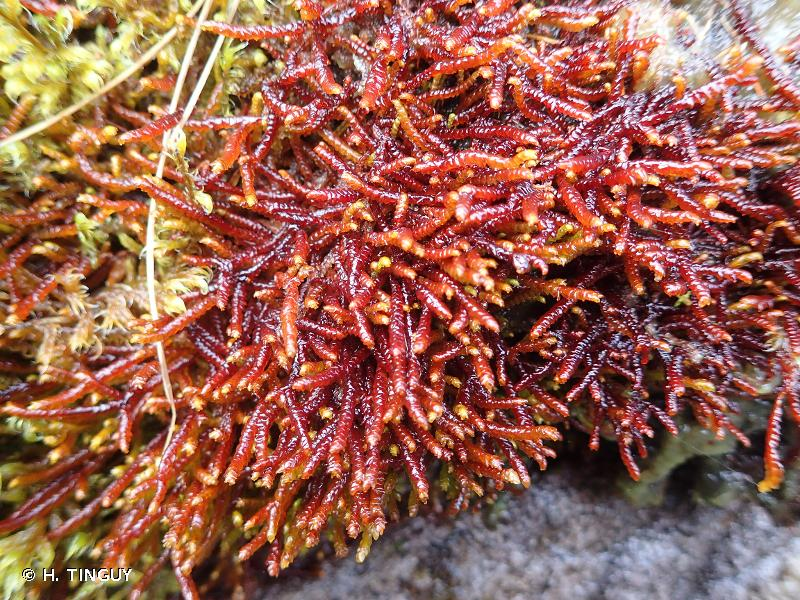

Conservation status
- Secure (NatureServe)

Scientific classification
- Kingdom: Plantae
- Division: Marchantiophyta
- Class: Jungermanniopsida
- Order: Pleuroziales
- Family: Pleuroziaceae
- Genus: Pleurozia
- Species: P. purpurea

Binomial name
- Pleurozia purpurea Lindb.

= Pleurozia purpurea =

Species of liverwort

Pleurozia purpurea is a species of thalloid liverwort, notable for its red to purple colour. Common names of the species include purple-worm liverwort and purple spoonwort.

== Geographic distribution ==
Pleurozia purpurea grows in bog environments found worldwide. The locations this species has been found in includes the following: "western Scotland and western Ireland, Norway, Faroes, Jan Meyen Island, Himalayas, Alaska, Guadeloupe, Hawaii".

== Habitat ==
Pleurozia purpurea often grows on the edges of bogs, fens and pools. However, it can also be found growing on lawns and other water saturated regions at high elevations, such as a "blanket bog, wet heath, montane turf, scree and peat-covered rock ledges". This species will grow in a matted form across the aforementioned water surfaces.

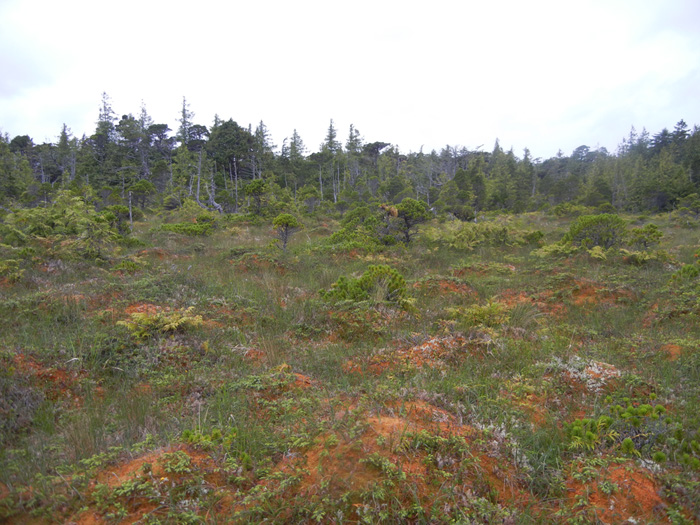
Haida Gwaii Bog, an archetypal environment for P. purpurea

== Morphology ==
In general, this thalloid liverwort is composed of worm like thallus, that often form a creeping mat; these mats can be branched or unbranched. Evident by its name, P. purpurea is often red, dark red-green or purple in colour.

Although P. purpurea is a thalloid liverwort, it contains egg shaped, large, concave leaves. The sac shape of the upper leaves help it to collect water. This feature is unique to liverworts in this genus (Pleurozia). The leaves are arranged in four rows; there are two rows of large leaves on the top side of the plant and two rows on the lower side. Like in other liverworts, oil bodies and trigones are visible in its leaves.

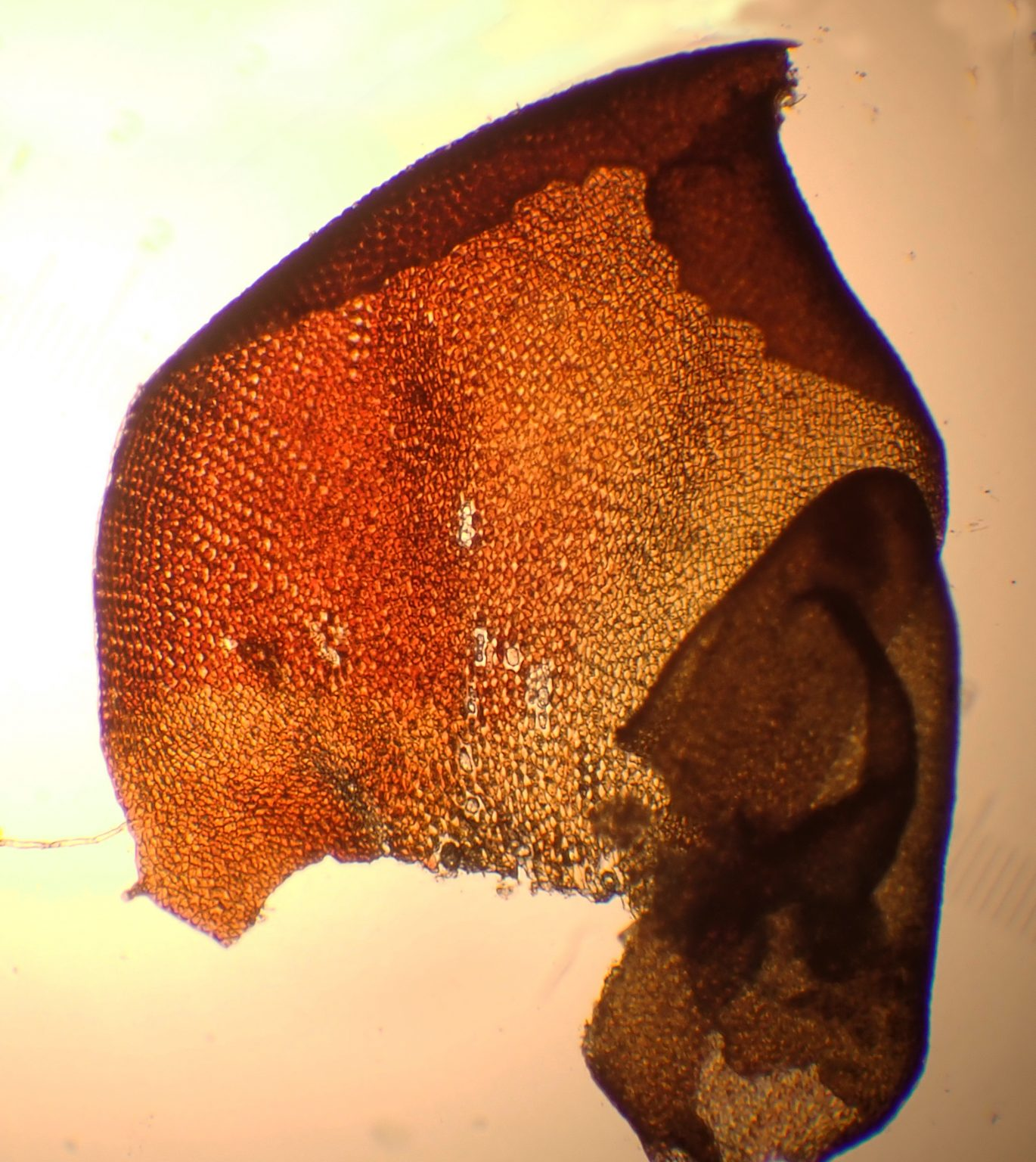
The leaf of P. purpurea

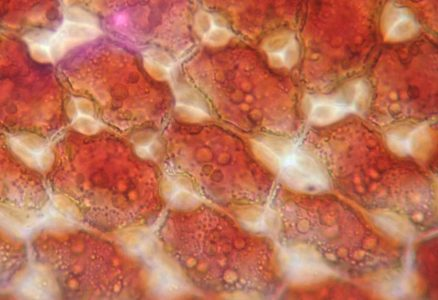
Microscopic photo of the leaf, showing oil bodies and trigones

== Ecology ==
Recent studies into Pleurozia purpurea have revealed that they participate in zoophagy. The sac shaped leaves of this species allows it easily collect and store water. However, it was found that P. purpurea also trapped Blepharisma americana, which is a protozoan species. Additionally, investigations found that this protozoan was attracted to the plant, who regularly (and purposefully) trapped small animals.
