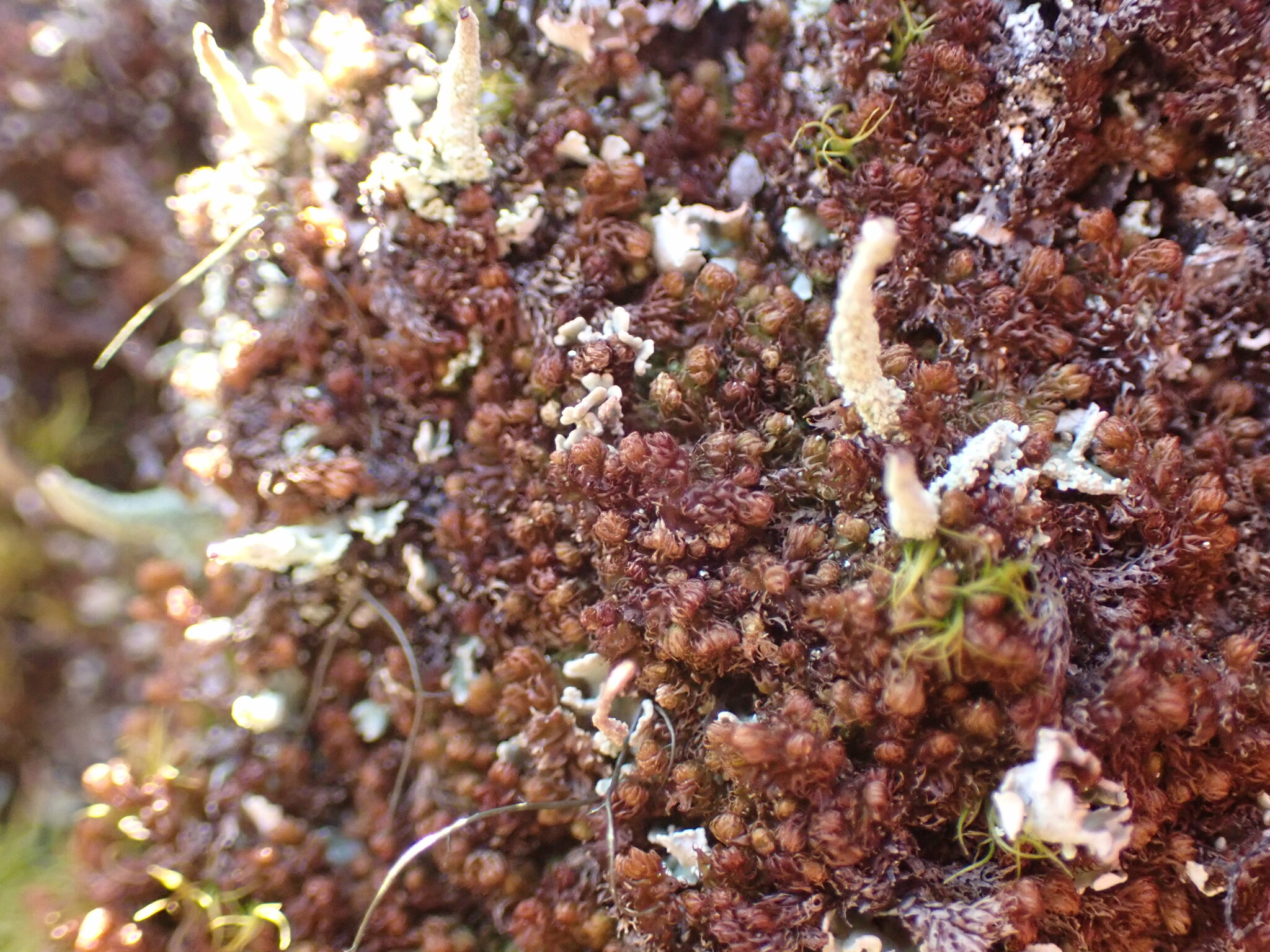

Conservation status
- Vulnerable (NatureServe)

Scientific classification
- Kingdom: Plantae
- Division: Marchantiophyta
- Class: Jungermanniopsida
- Order: Ptilidiales
- Family: Ptilidiaceae
- Genus: Ptilidium
- Species: P. californicum

Binomial name
- Ptilidium californicum (Austin) Pearson

= Ptilidium californicum =

Species of liverwort

Ptilidium californicum, the Pacific fuzzwort, is a rare liverwort of the western United States.

== Technical description ==
The plants are dioicous, small but medium-sized for a liverwort, from golden-green to golden, but more typically reddish-brown, or dilute purplish-red, or coppery red, resembling a dense fuzzy mat, occurring in small or large patches. Shoots are less than 1½ mm wide. Leaves are incubous (decurrent on the dorsal stem surface) and deeply bilobed, with each lobe divided 1–3 times, elongated, narrowly lanceolate, deeply divided. The lobe margins are entire, with 1 or 2 long, slender, cilia-like projections along the lobes margins and at lobe apices. The leaves are so closely overlapping that only a mass of ciliate projections is visible under a hand lens. The underleaves are prominent, wider than the stem but about or less than half the size of the leaves, 2–3 clefted, and with ciliate margins (even more finely divided into slender projections). The frequent perianths are plicate and narrowed to a ciliate mouth. Sporophytes are abundant from May to August.

== Distribution, habitat, and ecology ==
In the past, this plant has been reported from Russia and Japan, but recent literature calls it an endemic of the west coast of North America, ranging from southeastern Alaska to northern California.

This plant has a narrow environmental specificity; it is found in (and serves as an indicator species of) old-growth forest. It is typically epiphytic on bark at the base of standing mature to old-growth trees (Abies concolor, A. magnifica, and Pseudotsuga menziesii) or recently fallen logs; rarely on other organic substrates such as decaying logs and stumps, or humus covering boulders. At the southern end of its range (Oregon and California) this species is distinctly restricted to middle elevation forests. Its elevational range is from 1,275–5,725 feet (389–1,745 m).

The fire ecology of this plant is not known; however, fires in old-growth habitat might negatively affect P. californicum because of smoke, or from excessively opening the canopy. Severe fires that destroy old-growth trees would likely extirpate populations.

== Conservation status and threats ==
The plant is on the U.S. Forest Service Pacific Southwest Region Sensitive Species list, and has a NatureServe California State Rank of S3 and a Global Rank of G4.

The survival of Ptilidium californicum in the southern end of its range (i.e., northern California) depends upon the protection of the known sites as dispersal sources. The major threat facing P. californicum is loss of populations due to management activities that directly or indirectly impact the habitat or populations by disrupting stand conditions necessary for its survival. These include treatments such as the removal of colonized substrate, stand treatments that result in changes in microclimatic conditions or forest structure, or harvest of special forest products that may include individuals of this taxon. Spray paint used to mark 'leave,' 'take,' and 'wildlife' trees within project areas severely impact on this species. Liverwort diversity and abundance are strongly affected by forest age, and both components are much greater in old-growth forests. Therefore, the loss of old-growth habitats poses another threat to this species.

== Field identification ==
The leaves with many lobes divided into slender cilia make this species unmistakable.
