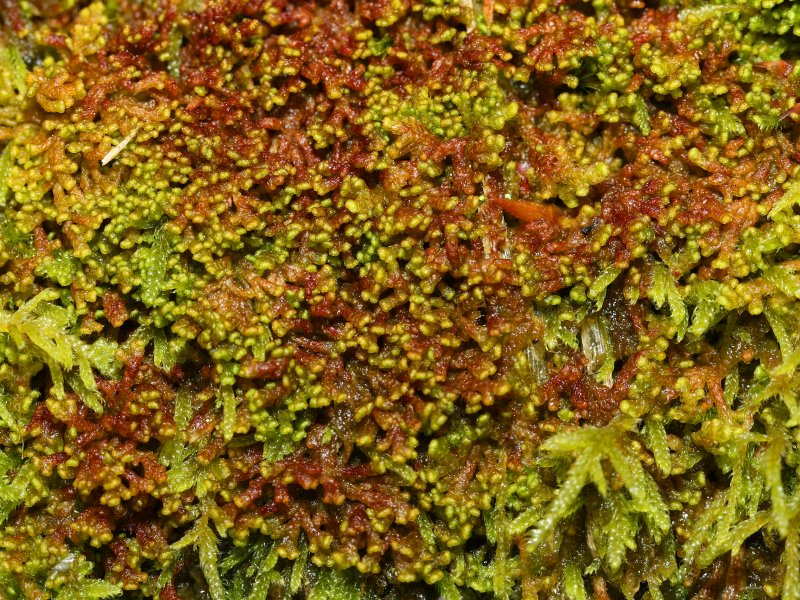
- Ptilidium pulcherrimum

Scientific classification
- Kingdom: Plantae
- Division: Marchantiophyta
- Class: Jungermanniopsida
- Order: Ptilidiales
- Family: Ptilidiaceae; H.Klinggr., 1858
- Genus: Ptilidium; Nees, 1833

Species
- Ptilidium californicum Ptilidium ciliare Ptilidium pulcherrimum

Synonyms
- Blepharozia (Dumort.) Dumort.

= Ptilidium =

Genus of liverworts

Ptilidium is a genus of liverwort, and is the only genus in family Ptilidiaceae. It includes only three species: Ptilidium californicum, Ptilidium ciliare, and Ptilidium pulcherrimum. The genus is distributed throughout the arctic and subarctic, with disjunct populations in New Zealand and Tierra del Fuego. Molecular analysis suggests that the genus has few close relatives and diverged from other leafy liverworts early in their evolution.

== Description ==
The name of the genus comes from the Greek word ptilidion for "small feather", in reference to the multiply deeply divided leaves with fringed edges, which give the plant a "feathery" appearance. Unlike other leafy liverworts, the underleaves are not significantly smaller than the lateral leaves. The "flossy" appearance from the leaf edges, together with the characteristic yellowish-brown or reddish-brown color make the genus easy to recognize.

Like Ptilidium, Blepharostoma and Trichocolea have deeply divided leaves with marginal cilia, however Ptilidium differs from these other two genera in that its leaf cells have bulging trigones (thickenings at the corners between cell walls).

The plants grow in dense mats, with stems growing either prostrate or ascending. Individual stems are once or twice pinnate, rarely with branches and only a few short rhizoids. The leaves are incubous and divided deeply into three to five portions, and edges of the leaf divisions are fringed with cilia. The underleaves are similar to the lateral leaves, but are slightly smaller. All species are dioicous, producing antheridia and archegonia on separate plants. The archegonia are terminal on a main stem. Mature sporophytes develop from within a large perianth with three distal folds.

The three species in the genus may be distinguished by the density of cilia along the leaf margin, depth of lobing in the leaf, width of the leaf base, and the substrate on which it is found growing. P. californicum has few cilia along the edge of its leaves and has underleaves lobed to about seven-eighths of their length. The other two species have many marginal cilia and underleaves lobed to no more than half their length. P. ciliare usually grows on soil and has leaf lobes that are 15–20 cells wide at their base. P. pulcherrimum usually grows on wood or rock, and has leaf lobes normally 6–10 cells wide at their base.

== Distribution ==
The genus Ptilidium has a boreal distribution, and is found in abundance in coniferous forests of Europe, Asia, and North America, as well as in New Zealand and Tierra del Fuego. Plants often grow attached to the bark of trees in the northern hemisphere, but may occur in rocks in mountain districts of New Zealand. At the more temperate ends of its range, plants are restricted to higher elevations.

Schuster (1984) proposed that the disjunct distribution of Ptilidium ciliare between the northern and southern hemispheres could be explained by migration of the Indian Plate from Gondwana. In this hypothesis, P. ciliare is a species originally native to Gondwana, and sterile populations existing in modern New Zealand and Tierra del Fuego are relicts of this earlier distribution. The other two species of Ptilidium are thus believed to be later descendants. Schuster's hypothesis is partially based upon a belief that Ptilidium is related to the genera Mastigophora and Dendromastigophora, both of which are largely restricted to the southern hemisphere. However, this relationship is not supported by modern molecular analysis, which places Mastigophora in an entirely different part of the liverwort phylogeny. Instead, Ptilidium is now believed to be part of an isolated clade allied only to two East Asian endemics, and it is thus more likely that the sterile populations of Ptilidium in the southern hemisphere reflect long-distance dispersal of plant fragments. Ptilidium ciliare is tolerant of desiccation and is ubiquitous in the Arctic, but rarely produces spores, and it is therefore believed to spread by means of such fragments.

== Phylogeny ==
- - - - - Leafy II (2600 spp)
        - - Ptilidium
          - - Neotrichocolea
            - Trichocoleopsis
      - Leafy I (1800 spp)
  - - - Pleurozia
      - - Metzgeriaceae
        - Aneuraceae

The diagram at left summarizes a portion of a 2006 cladistic analysis of liverworts based upon three chloroplast genes, one nuclear gene, and one mitochondrial gene. The genus Trichocoleopsis was not included in the original broad analysis, but is the sister taxon of Neotrichocolea according to a more narrowly focussed study utilizing six chloroplast genes, two nuclear genes, and a mitochondrial gene.

The genus Ptilidium is sister to the Trichocoleopsis-Neotrichocolea clade. This combined clade, in turn, attaches at the base of a large clade (2600 species) designated "Leafy II". That clade, together with "Leafy I" (another 1800 species) and Pleurozia constitute the Jungermanniales, as traditionally defined. Ptilidium, Neotrichocolea, and Trichocoleopsis thus sit at the base of the Jungermanniales, at a point where the two major groups of leafy liverworts diverge from each other.

== Gallery ==
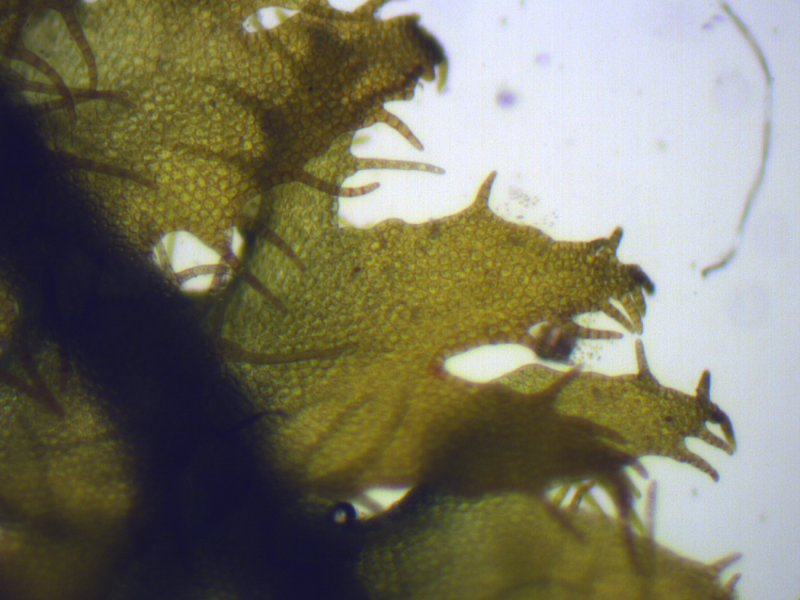
Magnified view of the stem of P. ciliare, showing the lateral leaves with deep lobing and marginal cilia.

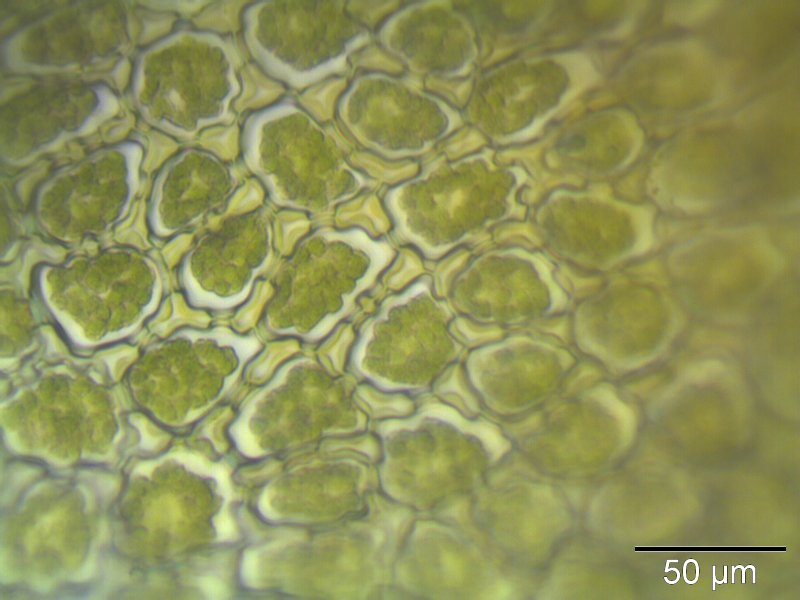
Higher magnification of the leaf surface, showing the trigones–cell wall thickenings in the corners between neighboring cells.
