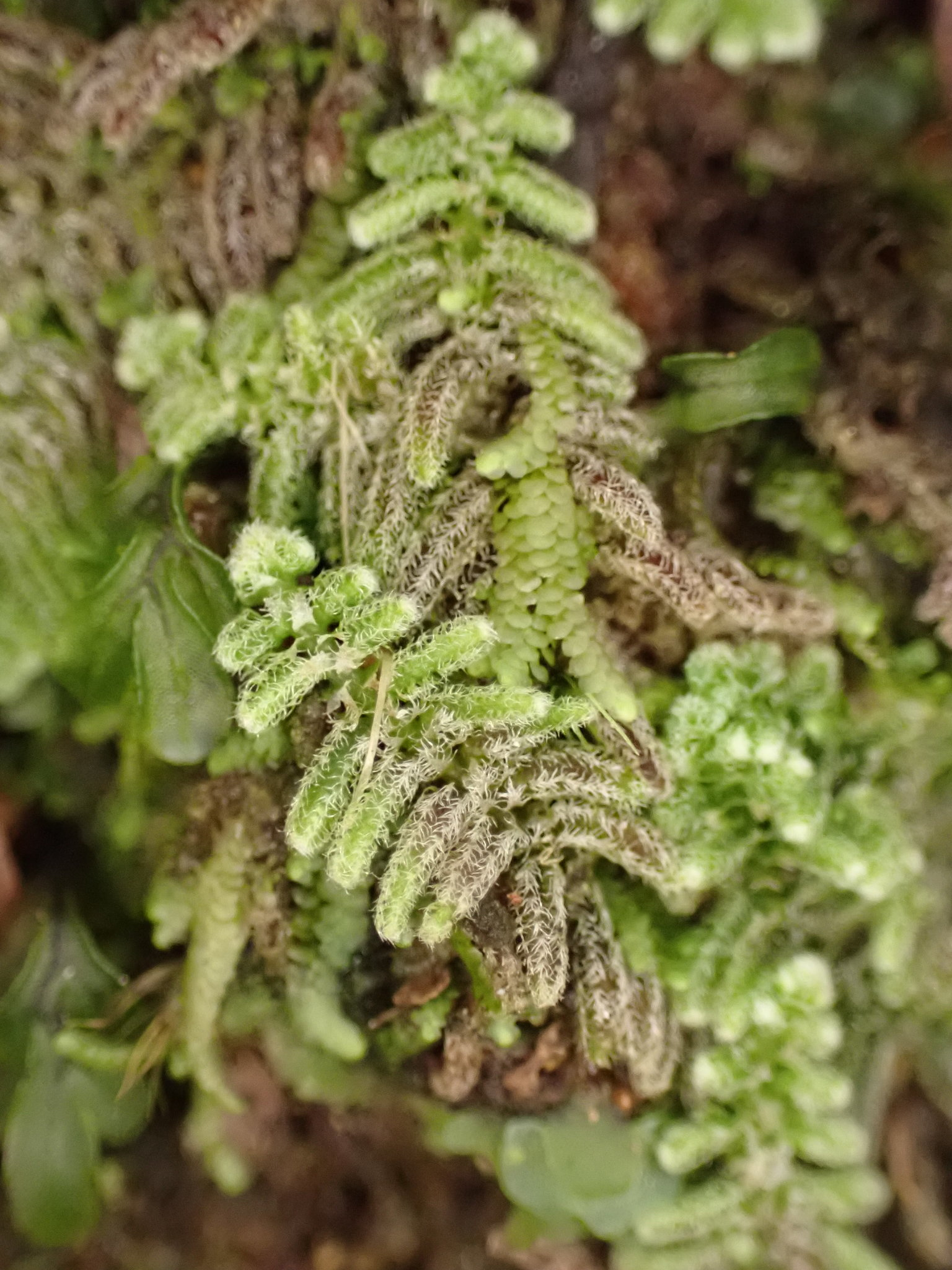
- Herzogianthus vaginatus

Scientific classification
- Kingdom: Plantae
- Division: Marchantiophyta
- Class: Jungermanniopsida
- Order: Ptilidiales
- Family: Herzogianthaceae; Stotler & Crand.Stotl.
- Genus: Herzogianthus; R.M.Schust.

Synonyms
- Anoplostoma E.A.Hodgs. & Allison

= Herzogianthus =

Genus of plants

Herzogianthaceae is a family of liverworts belonging to the order Ptilidiales. The monotypic family consists of only one genus: Herzogianthus R.M.Schust..

The genus name of Herzogianthus is in honour of Theodor Carl Julius Herzog (1880– 1961), who was a German bryologist and phytogeographer.

The genus was circumscribed by Rudolf Mathias Schuster in J. Hattori Bot. Lab. vol.23 on page 71 in 1961.

The genus is only found in New Zealand.

== Species ==
The genus contains 2 known species;

- Herzogianthus sanguineus R.M.Schust.
- Herzogianthus vaginatus (Herzog) R.M.Schust.
