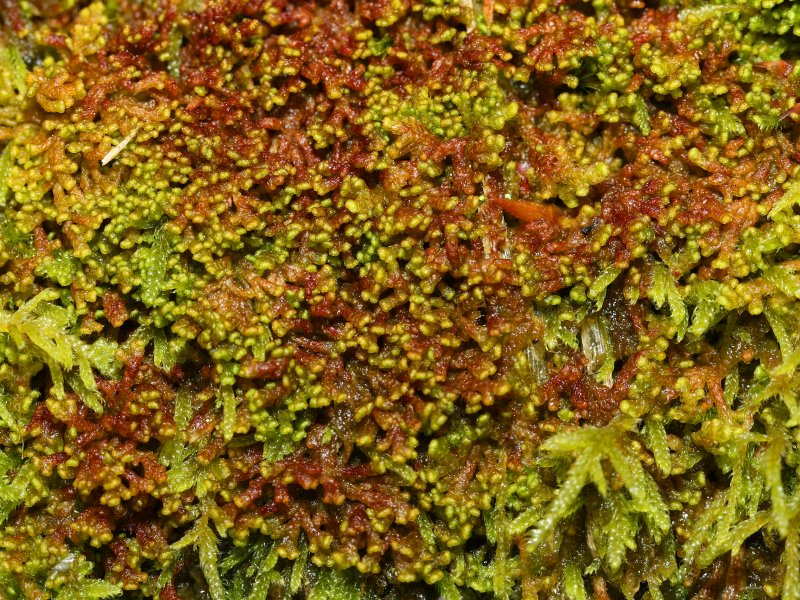

Conservation status
- Secure (NatureServe)

Scientific classification
- Kingdom: Plantae
- Division: Marchantiophyta
- Class: Jungermanniopsida
- Order: Ptilidiales
- Family: Ptilidiaceae
- Genus: Ptilidium
- Species: P. pulcherrimum

Binomial name
- Ptilidium pulcherrimum (Weber) Vain.

= Ptilidium pulcherrimum =

Species of liverwort

Ptilidium pulcherrimum is a liverwort in the genus Ptilidium known by the common name tree fringewort in English. It is found across North America, Northern Europe, and Asia.

== Description ==
Ptilidium pulcherrimum is a leafy liverwort with a reddish to yellowish-green coloration and distinct deeply divided leaf margins. It grows closely to tree bark in dense patches and exhibits a pinnate branching growth pattern. Its stems are usually obscured by its overlapping leaves which are measured at 1.8 mm (0.07 in) in width and 1.4 mm (0.06 in) in length.

== Habitat ==
Ptilidium pulcherrimum is typically found on the trunks or branches of living trees and shrubs but can also be found on fallen logs or boulders.

== Similar species ==
P. pulcherrimum can be easily confused with P. ciliare. However, P. pulcherrimum is more commonly found on wood and grows more tightly to the substrate than P. ciliare. It also has deeper divisions in its leaves compared to P. ciliare.
