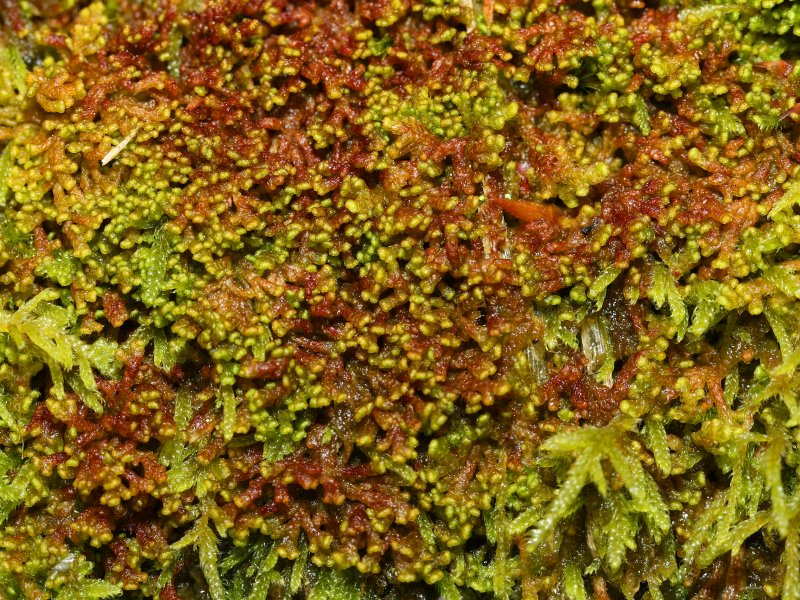
- Ptilidium pulcherrimum.

Scientific classification
- Kingdom: Plantae
- Division: Marchantiophyta
- Class: Jungermanniopsida
- Subclass: Jungermanniidae
- Order: Ptilidiales; Schljakov 1972

Families
- Herzogianthaceae Stotler & Crandall-Stotler 2009; Ptilidiaceae von Klinggräff 1858; Neotrichocoleaceae Inoue 1974

= Ptilidiales =

Order of liverworts

Ptilidiales is an order of liverworts.

== Taxonomy ==
- Herzogianthaceae Stotler & Crandall-Stotler 2009
  - Herzogianthus Schuster 1961 [Anoplostoma Hodgson & Allison 1962]
- Neotrichocoleaceae Inoue 1974
  - Neotrichocolea Hattori 1947
  - Trichocoleopsis Okamura 1911
- Ptilidiaceae von Klinggräff 1858
  - Ptilidium Nees 1833 [Blepharozia Dumortier 1835]
