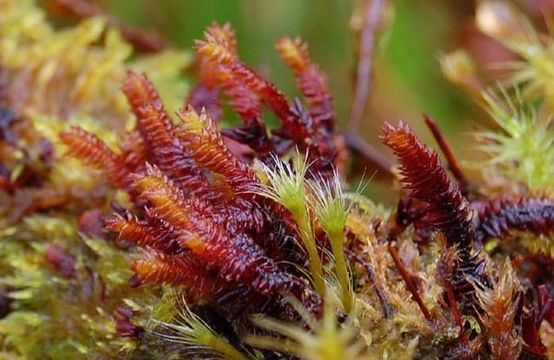
- Pleurozia purpurea

Scientific classification
- Kingdom: Plantae
- Division: Marchantiophyta
- Class: Jungermanniopsida
- Subclass: Metzgeriidae
- Order: Pleuroziales; Schljakov
- Family: Pleuroziaceae (Schiffn.) Müll.Frib.
- Genus: Pleurozia; Dumort.

Synonyms
- Eopleurozia Schust.; Physiotium Nees

= Pleurozia =

Genus of liverworts

Pleurozia is the only genus of liverworts in the family Pleuroziaceae, which is now classified in its own order Pleuroziales, but was previously included in a broader circumscription of the Jungermanniales. The genus includes twelve species, and as a whole is both physically distinctive and widely distributed.

The lower leaf lobes of Pleurozia species are fused, forming a closed water sac covered by a movable lid similar in structure to those of the angiosperm genus Utricularia. These sacs were assumed to play a role in water storage, but a 2005 study on Pleurozia purpurea found that the sacs attract and trap ciliates, much in the same way as Utricularia. Observations of plants in situ also revealed a large number of trapped prey within the sacs, suggesting that the species in this genus obtain some benefit from a carnivorous habit. After Colura, this was the second report of zoophagy among the liverworts.

== Taxonomy ==
The genus Pleurozia has been subdivided into three subgenera:

- Pleurozia subg. Pleurozia
  - Pleurozia gigantea (Weber) Lindberg
- Pleurozia subg. Constantifolia Thiers
  - Pleurozia purpurea Lindberg
  - Pleurozia conchifolia (Hooker & Arnott) Austin
- Pleurozia subg. Diversifolia Thiers
  - Pleurozia acinosa (Mitten) Trevisan
  - Pleurozia articulata (Lindberg) Lindberg & Lackström
  - Pleurozia caledonica (Gottsche ex Jack) Stephani
  - Pleurozia curiosa Thiers
  - Pleurozia heterophylla Stephani ex Fulford
  - Pleurozia johannis-winkleri Herzog
  - Pleurozia paradoxa (Jack) Schiffner
  - Pleurozia subinflata (Austin) Austin
- Unplaced
  - Pleurozia pocsii Müller
