= Smith system =

System of taxonomy of the cryptogams

A system of taxonomy of the cryptogams, the Smith system was published in:

Smith, G.M. (1938). Cryptogamic Botany, vol. 1. Algae and fungi. McGraw-Hill, New York.
Smith, G.M. (1955). Cryptogamic Botany, vol. 2. Bryophytes and pteridophytes. 2nd ed. McGraw-Hill, New York.

== Division Chlorophyta ==
- Class 1. Chlorophyceae

- Order 1. Volvocales

- Family 1. Chlamydomonadaceae
- Family 2. Volvocaceae

- Order 2. Tetrasporales
- Order 3. Ulotrichales

- Family 1. Ulotrichaceae
- Family 2. Microsporaceae
- Family 3. Cylindrocapsaceae
- Family 4. Chaetophoraceae
- Family 5. Protococcaceae
- Family 6. Coleochaetaceae
- Family 7. Trentepohliaceae

- Order 4. Ulvales

- Family 1. Ulvaceae
- Family 2 Schizomeridaceae

- Order 5. Schizogoniales

- Family Schizogoniaceae

- Order 6. Cladophorales

- Family 1. Cladophoraceae
- Family 2. Sphaeropleaceae

- Order 7. Oedogoniales

- Family Oedogoniaceae

- Order 8. Zygnematales

- Family 1. Zygnemataceae
- Family 2. Mesotaeniaceae
- Family 3. Desmidiaceae

- Order 9. Chlorococcales

- Family 1. Chlorococcaceae
- Family 2. Endosphaeraceae
- Family 3. Characiaceae
- Family 4. Protosiphonaceae
- Family 5. Hydrodictyaceae
- Family 6. Oöcystaceae
- Family 7. Scenedesmaceae

- Order 10. Siphonales

- Family 1. Bryopsidaceae
- Family 2. Caulerpaceae
- Family 3. Halicystaceae
- Family 4. Codiaceae
- Family 5. Derbesiaceae
- Family 6. Vaucheriaceae
- Family 7. Phyllosiphonaceae

- Order 11. Siphonocladiales

- Family 1. Valoniaceae
- Family 2. Dasycladaceae

- Class 2. Charophyceae

- Order Charales

- Family Characeae

== Division Euglenophyta ==
- Order 1. Euglenales
- Order 2. Colaciales (Euglenocapsales)

== Division Pyrrophyta ==
- Class 1. Cryptophyceae
- Class 2. Desmokontae
- Class 3. Dinophyceae

- Order 1. Gymnodiniales
- Order 2. Peridiniales
- Order 3. Dinophysidales
- Order 4. Rhyzodiniales
- Order 5. Dinocapsales
- Order 6. Dinotrichales
- Order 7. Dinococcales

== Division Chrysophyta ==
- Class 1. Xanthophyceae (Heterokontae)

- Order 1. Heterochloridales
- Order 2. Rhizochloridales
- Order 3. Heterocapsales
- Order 4. Heterotrichales
- Order 5. Heterococcales
- Order 6. Heterosiphonales

- Class 2. Chrysophyceae

- Order 1. Chrysomonadales

- Suborder 1. Cromulinae
- Suborder 2. Isochrysidineae
- Suborder 3. Ochromonadineae

- Order 2. Rhizochrysidales
- Order 3. Chrysocapsales
- Order 4. Chrysotrichales
- Order 5. Chrysosphaerales

- Class 3. Bacillariophyceae

- Order 1. Centrales
- Order 2. Pennales

== Division Phaeophyta ==
- Class 1. Isogeneratae

- Order 1. Ectocarpales
- Order 2. Sphacelariales
- Order 3. Tilopteridales
- Order 4. Cutleriales
- Order 5. Dictyotales

- Class 2. Heterogeneratae

- Subclass 1. Haplostichineae

- Order 1. Chordariales
- Order 2. Sporochnales
- Order 3. Desmarestiales

- Subclass 2. Polystichineae

- Order 1. Punctariales
- Order 2. Dictyosiphonales
- Order 3. Laminariales

- Class 3. Cyclosporeae

- Order Fucales

== Division Cyanophyta ==
- Class Myxophyceae (Cyanophyceae)

- Order 1. Chroococcales
- Order 2. Chamaesiphonales
- Order 3. Hormogonales

== Division Rhodophyta ==
- Class Rhodophyceae

- Subclass 1. Bangioideae

- Order Bangiales

- Subclass 2. Florideae

- Order 1. Nemalionales
- Order 2. Gelidiales
- Order 3. Cryptonemiales
- Order 4. Gigartinales
- Order 5. Rhodymeniales
- Order 6. Ceramiales

== Division Myxothallophyta ==
- Class 1. Myxomycetae

- Subclass 1. Endosporeae
- Subclass 2. Exosporeae

- Class 2. Phytomyxinae
- Class 3. Acrasieae

== Division Eumycetae ==
- Class 1. Phycomycetae

- Order 1. Chytridiales

- Family 1. Rhizidiaceae
- Family 2. Olpidiaceae
- Family 3. Synchytriaceae
- Family 4. Cladochytriaceae
- Family 5. Woroninaceae

- Order 2. Blastocladiales
- Order 3. Monoblepharidales
- Order 4. Ancylistales
- Order 5. Saprolegniales

- Family 1. Saprolegniaceae
- Family 2. Leptomitaceae
- Family 3. Pythiaceae

- Order 6. Peronosporales
- Order 7. Mucorales
- Order 8. Entomophthorales

- Class 2. Ascomycetae

- Subclass 1. Protoascomycetae
- Subclass 2. Euascomycetae

- Order 1. Aspergillales
- Order 2. Erysiphales
- Order 3. Hysteriales
- Order 4. Phacidiales
- Order 5. Pezizales
- Order 6. Tuberales
- Order 7. Helvellales
- Order 8. Exoascales
- Order 9. Hypocreales
- Order 10. Sphaeriales
- Order 11. Dothidiales
- Order 12. Laboulbeniales

- Class 3. Basidiomycetae

- Subclass 1. Eubasidii

- Order 1. Agaricales (Hymenomyceatae)
- Order 2. Lycoperdales (Gasteromycetae)
- Order 3. Dacryomycetales
- Order 4. Tremellales
- Order 5. Auriculariales

- Subclass 2. Hemibasidii

- Order 1. Urediniales
- Order 2. Ustilaginales

- Family 1. Ustilaginaceae
- Family 2. Tilletiaceae

- Class 4. Fungi imperfecti
- Lichens

- Subclass 1. Ascholichenes
- Subclass 2. Basidiolichenes

== Division Bryophyta ==
- Class 1. Hepaticae (liverworts)

- Order 1. Sphaerocarpales

- Family 1. Sphaerocarpaceae
- Family 2. Riellaceae

- Order 2. Marchantiales

- Family 1. Ricciaceae
- Family 2. Corsiniaceae
- Family 3. Targioniaceae
- Family 4. Monocleaceae
- Family 5. Marchantiaceae

- Order 3. Jungermanniales

- Suborder 1. Metzgerineae
- Suborder 2. Jungermannineae

- Order 4. Calobryales

- Class 2. Anthocerotae (hornworts)

- Order 1. Anthocerotales

- Class 3. Musci (mosses)

- Subclass 1. Sphagnobrya
- Subclass 2. Andreaeobrya
- Subclass 3. Eubrya

== Division Psilophyta ==
- Class 1. Psilophytinae (psilophytes)

- Order 1. Psilophytales

- Family 1. Rhyniaceae
- Family 2. Psilophytaceae
- Family 3. Pseudosporochnaceae
- Family 4. Zosterophyllaceae
- Family 5. Asteroxylaceae

- Order 2. Psilotales

== Division Lepidophyta ==
- Class 1. Lycopodinae (lycopods)

- Order 1. Lycopodiales

- Family 1. Protolepidodendraceae
- Family 2. Lycopodiaceae

- Order 2. Selaginellales

- Family 1. Selaginellaceae
- Family 2. Miadesmiaceae

- Order 3. Lepidodendrales

- Family 1. Lepidodendraceae
- Family 2. Lepidocarpaceae
- Family 3. Bothrodendraceae
- Family 4. Sigillariaceae

- Order 4. Isoetales

- Family 1. Pleuromeiaceae
- Family 2. Isoetaceae

== Division Calamophyta ==
- Class 1. Equisetinae (horsetails)

- Order 1. Hyeniales
- Order 2. Sphenophyllales
- Order 3. Equisetales

- Family 1. Calamitaceae
- Family 2. Equisetaceae

== Division Pterophyta ==
- Class 1. Filicinae (ferns)

- Subclass 1. Primofilices (or Inversicatenales, Coenopterideae, Palaeopteridales)

- Order 1. Protopteridales

- Family 1. Protopteridaceae
- Family 2. Cladoxylaceae

- Order 2. Coenopteridales

- Family 1. Zygopteridaceae
- Family 2. Botryopteridaceae
- Family 3. Anachoropteridaceae

- Order 3. Archaeopteridales

- Subclass 2. Eusporangitae

- Order 1. Ophioglossales
- Order 2. Marattiales

- Subclass 3. Leptosporangiatae

- Order 1. Filicales

- Family 1. Osmundaceae
- Family 2. Schizaeaceae
- Family 3. Gleicheniaceae
- Family 4. Matoniaceae
- Family 5. Dipteridaceae
- Family 6. Hymenophyllaceae
- Family 7. Cyatheaceae
- Family 8. Dicksoniaceae
- Family 9. Polypodiaceae
- Family 10. Parkeriaceae

- Order 2. Marsileales
- Order 3. Salviniales
