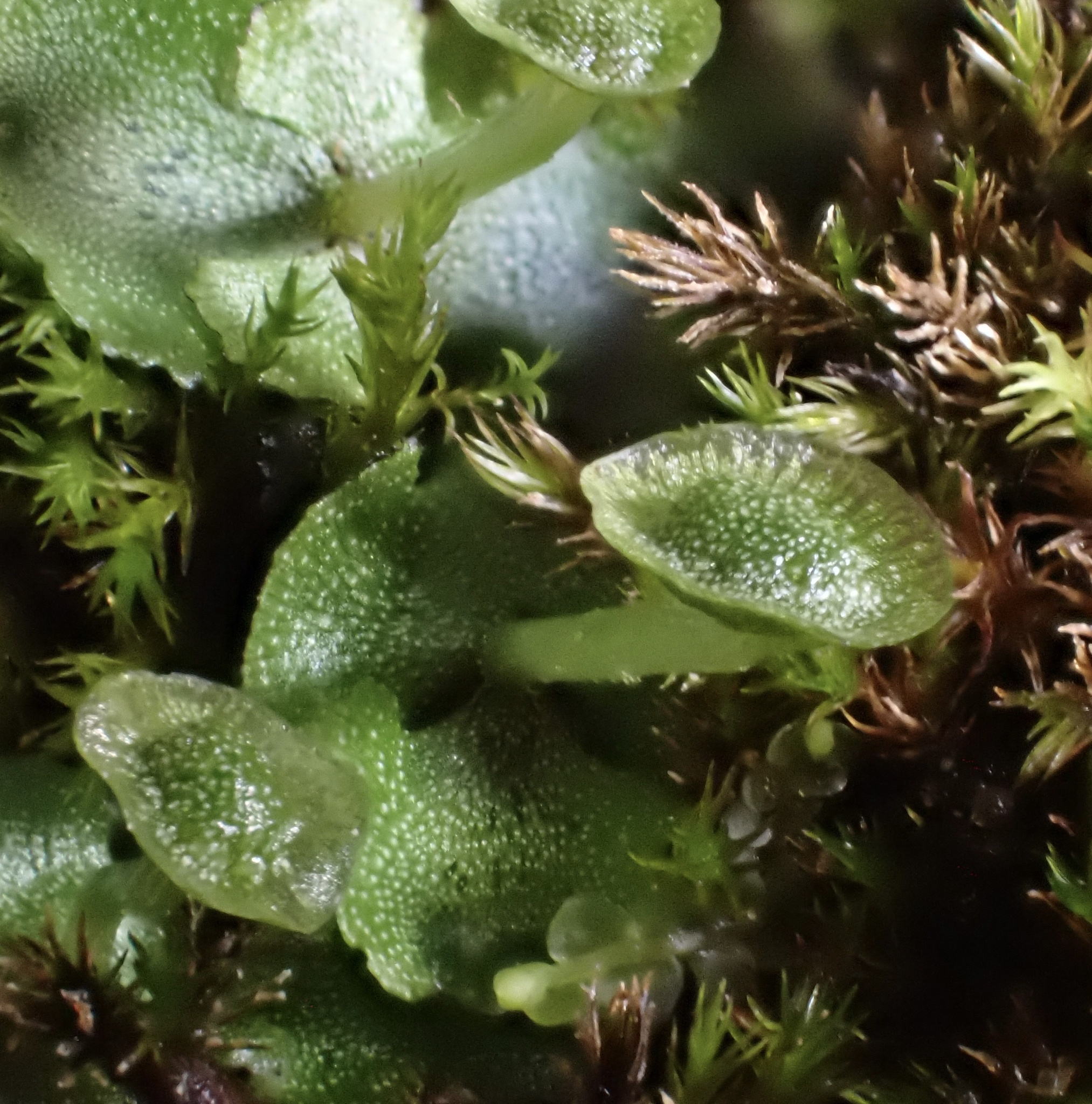
- Marchantia quadrata

Conservation status
- Secure (NatureServe)

Scientific classification
- Kingdom: Plantae
- Division: Marchantiophyta
- Class: Marchantiopsida
- Order: Marchantiales
- Family: Marchantiaceae
- Genus: Marchantia
- Species: M. quadrata

Binomial name
- Marchantia quadrata Scop., 1772

Synonyms
- List: Conocephalus quadratus (Scop.) Huebener; Achiton quadratus (Scop.) Corda; Chomiocarpon quadratum (Scop.) Lindb.; Conocephalum quadratum (Scop.) Huebener; Cyathophora quadrata (Scop.) Trevis.; Marchantia commutata var. quadrata (Scop.) Lindenb.; Preissia quadrata (Scop.) Nees; Reboulia quadrata (Scop.) Bertol.

= Marchantia quadrata =

Species of liverwort

Marchantia quadrata is a species of liverwort, a simple non-flowering plant that grows as a flat, green, leaf-like structure (thallus) typically found on damp rocks and soil along stream banks in the Northern Hemisphere. The species was originally classified in its own genus Preissia due to its distinctive features, including larger spores and lack of the specialised cup-like reproductive structures common in other liverworts, but genetic studies have shown it belongs within the genus Marchantia. Like most liverworts, it reproduces both sexually, through separate male and female plants that produce umbrella-like reproductive structures, and through regeneration from fragments. The species prefers slightly drier habitats than its relatives and shows significant genetic variation across its range, suggesting it may comprise several distinct but closely related species.

== Taxonomy and evolution ==
Marchantia quadrata was originally described as a distinct genus, Preissia, but molecular phylogenetics studies have shown that both Preissia and Bucegia are deeply nested within Marchantia. As a result, these genera have been merged into Marchantia, with M. quadrata and M. romanica (formerly Bucegia romanica) now placed in Marchantia subgenus Preissia. This subgenus can be distinguished from other Marchantia groups by several key features: it lacks the characteristic cup-shaped structures (gemma cups) and their contained reproductive bodies (gemmae) that are typically found on the plant's surface. The underside of the plant has only two rows of scale-like structures rather than multiple rows. The male reproductive structures form smooth, unlobed discs, while the female reproductive structures have short lobes and stalks with two grooves containing root-like rhizoids. Unlike other Marchantia species, these stalks lack the green, chambered tissue typical of the genus.

The species belongs to clade II of Marchantia, which includes only M. quadrata and M. romanica. Both species have a pan-continental distribution, though limited, largely in the northern hemisphere. Enzyme polymorphism has been detected in M. quadrata populations from Europe, Asia and North America, and ribosomal DNA sequences differ significantly between populations, suggesting M. quadrata as currently circumscribed might represent multiple taxa. Two proposed subspecies have been suggested based on sexual differences (dioicous versus monoicous), however, no known genetic or other morphological markers correlate with these proposed subspecies.

== Description ==
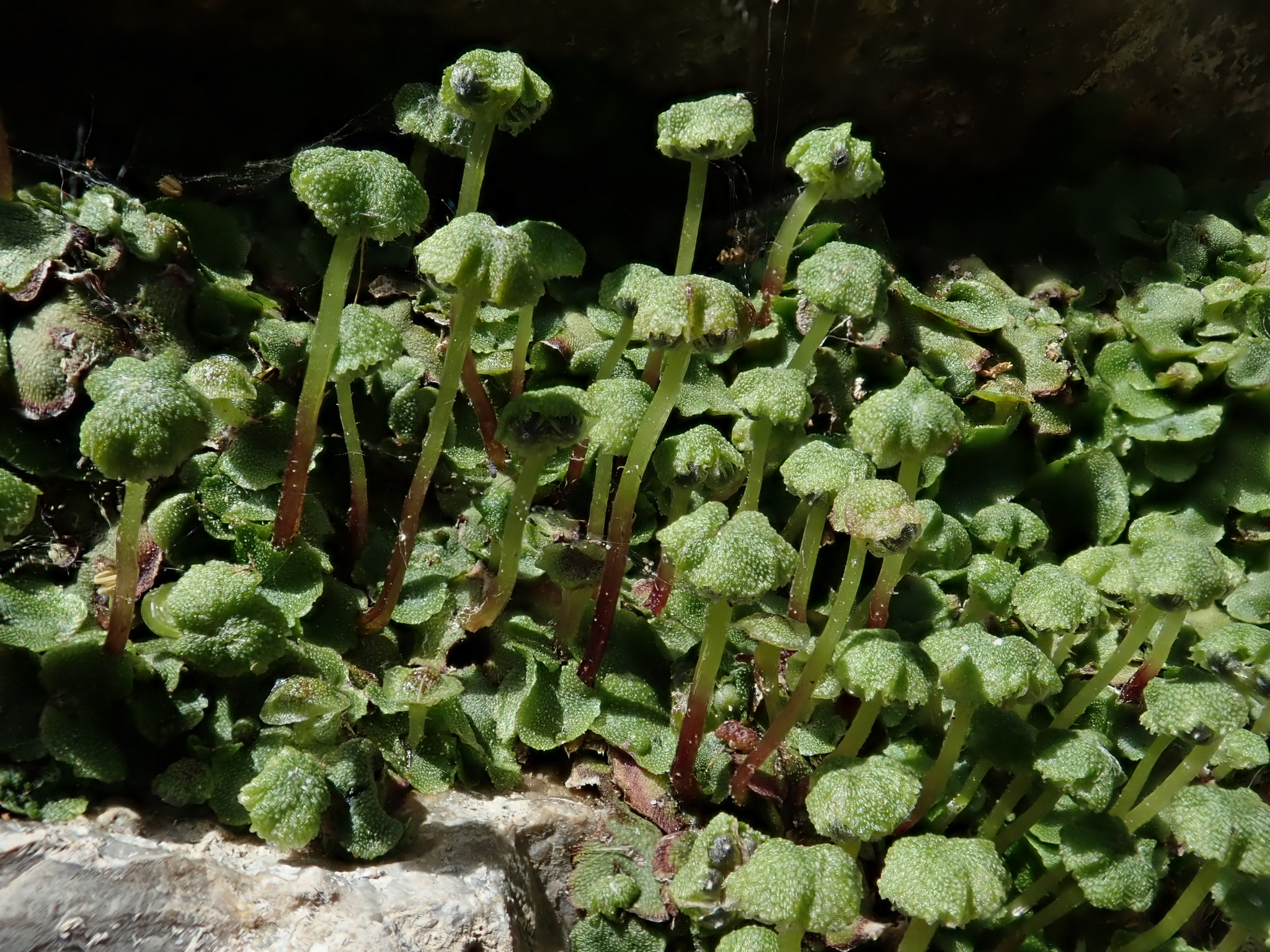
A colony growing on rock in Liezen, Austria. The green leafy thalli (ground-hugging plant bodies) bear numerous umbrella-like antheridiophores on reddish-brown stalks, indicating this is a male plant.

The adult thallus of M. quadrata is characterised by its substantial thickness, reaching up to 35 cell layers deep excluding the chlorophyllose cells in the air chambers. Unlike some related species, it lacks a definite midrib. The thallus is pale green with somewhat wavy margins, and branches dichotomously when young, later forming apical innovations. The ventral surface bears two longitudinal rows of purple scales along the median line, and both smooth and pegged rhizoids.

The thallus contains specialised sclerotic cells in its ventral region that serve as conducting tissue, though these differ from true tracheids in both form and function. These sclerotic cells are elongated, thick-walled, dark brown, fibre-like cells with pointed ends that typically occur singly, though occasionally two or three may be found together. Their primary function is believed to be water conduction and storage, as they are absent in plants grown in moist conditions.

Growth occurs via a single cuneate apical cell that cuts off segments from its four sides. The species demonstrates significant regenerative capabilities, readily producing adventitious growths from its ventral cells under suitable conditions. This regenerative growth is particularly evident when plants are subjected to greenhouse conditions at the end of the growing season, though fruiting plants bearing archegonial heads typically fail to continue development during this period.

== Reproduction ==
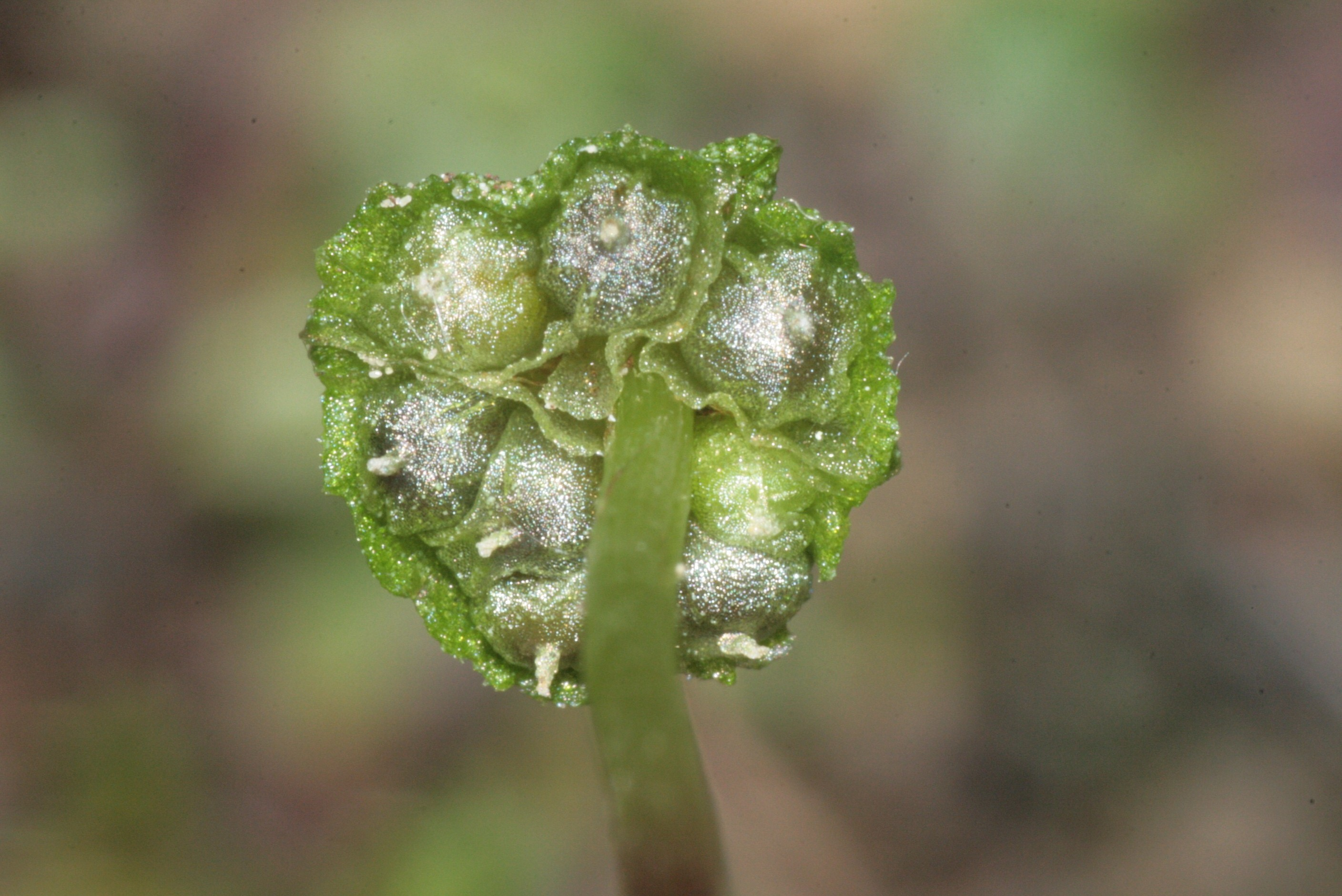
Male reproductive structure (antheridiophore), showing its characteristic unlobed disc shape viewed from below. The silvery-white depressions visible on the underside of the disc contain the sperm-producing antheridia.

Marchantia quadrata is typically dioecious (with separate male and female plants), though monoecious individuals occur rarely (approximately 1% of plants). Both male and female reproductive structures are borne on stalked receptacles, with bisexual receptacles being relatively common. Male receptacles typically contain 36–40 antheridia, while female receptacles bear 12–16 archegonia, usually distributed as three to four per quadrant, though up to six have been observed in a single quadrant.

The timing of reproductive development shows distinct seasonal patterns. Male receptacles are most abundant early in the growing season, while female receptacles predominate later. Bisexual receptacles reach their peak frequency during mid-season. On bisexual receptacles, antheridial development always precedes archegonial formation.

=== Sporophyte development ===
Despite nearly complete fertilisation success, mature sporophyte development is limited, with receptacles typically producing between one and six sporophytes, averaging about 3 per head. Each sporophyte capsule produces approximately 3,000 spores, resulting in an average of 9,000 spores per receptacle head. This represents a significant reduction compared to the related M. polymorpha, which produces over 7 million spores per head.

The spores of M. quadrata are larger than those of M. polymorpha, measuring approximately 75 micrometres (μm) in diameter compared to 18 μm. The species produces elaters (specialized cells that aid in spore dispersal) that are proportionally more numerous relative to spore count than in M. quadrata, though smaller in size. Evidence suggests that spore mother cells and elater cells are derived from the same generation of cells.

=== Spore germination and development ===
The spores show high initial viability, with 100% germination rates when fresh, though this declines to approximately 10% after four to five months. Germination typically occurs within six days under suitable conditions on solid substrate. The species shows less adaptation to hydrophytic (aquatic) conditions during early development compared to M. polymorpha, reflecting its more strictly mesophytic adult behaviour. In its natural habitat, M. quadrata is typically found growing on thin soil covering granitic rocks, usually along stream banks, and tends to occupy relatively drier situations than both M. polymorpha and Conocephalum.

Young gametophyte development is characterised by rapid cell division, resulting in progressively smaller cells despite the large initial spore size. The developing thallus frequently exhibits branching, with some spores producing twin thalli. Unlike M. polymorpha, young plants of M. quadrata lack specialised cells for essential oil storage. The early-stage plants produce smooth-walled rhizoids for anchorage, along with mucilage hairs, though these rhizoids are relatively few in number compared to related species.
