= Neesiella =

Neesiella may refer to:

- Neesiella, a genus of liverworts in the family Aytoniaceae, synonym of Mannia
- Neesiella, a genus of plants in the family Acanthaceae, synonym of Andrographis
- Neesiella, a genus of fungi in the family Xylariaceae, synonym of Anthostomella
