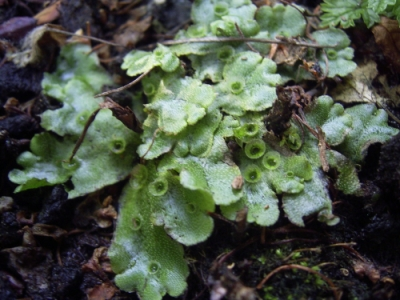
- Marchantia polymorpha

Scientific classification
- Kingdom: Plantae
- Division: Marchantiophyta
- Class: Marchantiopsida
- Order: Marchantiales
- Family: Marchantiaceae; Lindl.

Genera
- Marchantia

= Marchantiaceae =

Family of liverworts

Marchantiaceae is a family of liverworts in order Marchantiales. It contains a single genus Marchantia.

== Genera in Marchantiaceae ==
Until recently, three genera were included in the Marchantiaceae:

- Bucegia Radian 1903
- Marchantia Linnaeus 1753
- Preissia Corda 1829 non Opiz 1852

However, the genera Bucegia and Preissia have since been merged into Marchantia, leaving only the single genus in the family.

A number of additional genera have been moved to other families:

- Asterella, now in family Aytoniaceae
- Conocephalum, now in family Conocephalaceae
- Dumortiera, now in family Dumortieraceae
- Lunularia, now in family Lunulariaceae
- Reboulia, now in family Aytoniaceae
- Neohodgsonia, now in family Neohodgsoniaceae
