= Cyathophora =

Cyathophora may refer to:

- Euphorbia cyathophora, a species of plant sometimes called fire on the mountain
- Cyathophora (coral), a prehistoric genus of Hexacorallia
- Cyathophora, a genus of liverwort in the family Aytoniaceae, synonym of Mannia
