= Targionia =

Targionia may refer to a genus of:

- Targionia (plant), a liverwort
- Targonia (insect), a plant scale in the Targioniina tribe, of the Coccoidea
