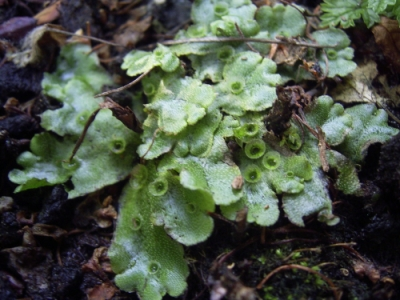
- Marchantia polymorpha

Scientific classification
- Kingdom: Plantae
- Division: Marchantiophyta
- Class: Marchantiopsida
- Order: Marchantiales
- Family: Marchantiaceae
- Genus: Marchantia; L., 1753

Species
- See text

= Marchantia =

Genus of liverworts

Marchantia is a genus of liverworts in the family Marchantiaceae and the order Marchantiales. The genus was named by French botanist Jean Marchant after his father. The widespread species Marchantia polymorpha has had its genome sequenced and is an incipient model organism.

The thallus of Marchantia shows differentiation into two layers: an upper photosynthetic layer with a well-defined upper epidermis with pores and a lower storage layer. The thallus features tiny cup-like structures called gemma cups, containing gemmae, small packets of tissue that are used for asexual reproduction. The combination of barrel-shaped pores and the circular shape of the gemma cups are diagnostic of the genus.

Multicellular purple colored scales with single cell thickness and unicellular rhizoids are present on the ventral surface of the thallus.

== Reproduction ==
Marchantia can reproduce both sexually and asexually. Sexual reproduction involves sperm from antheridia on the male plant fertilizing an ovum (egg cell) in the archegonium of a female plant. The antheridia and archegonia are borne a top special gametophore stalks called antheridiophores and archegoniophores, respectively. These are borne on separate thalli and thus the plants are dioicous.

Once fertilized, the ovum is called a zygote and develops into a small sporophyte plant, which remains attached to the larger gametophyte plant. The sporophyte produces spores which develop into free-living male and female gametophyte plants.

Asexual reproduction occurs by means of gemmae, discoid clumps of cells which are genetically identical to the parent and contained in cup-like structures on the upper surface of the plant. These are dispersed when rain splashes into the cups and develop into new plants. Asexual reproduction can also occur when older parts of the plant die and the surviving newer branches develop into separate plants.

== Species ==
- Marchantia alpestris
- Marchantia aquatica
- Marchantia berteroana
- Marchantia carrii
- Marchantia chenopoda
- Marchantia debilis
- Marchantia domingenis
- Marchantia emarginata
- Marchantia foliacia
- Marchantia grossibarba
- Marchantia inflexa
- Marchantia linearis
- Marchantia macropora
- Marchantia novoguineensis
- Marchantia paleacea
- Marchantia palmata
- Marchantia papillata
- Marchantia pappeana
- Marchantia polymorpha (also as M. aquatica)
- Marchantia quadrata (also as P. quadrata)
- Marchantia rubribarba
- Marchantia solomonensis
- Marchantia streimannii
- Marchantia subgeminata
- Marchantia vitiensis
- Marchantia wallisii
- Marchantia nepalensis
