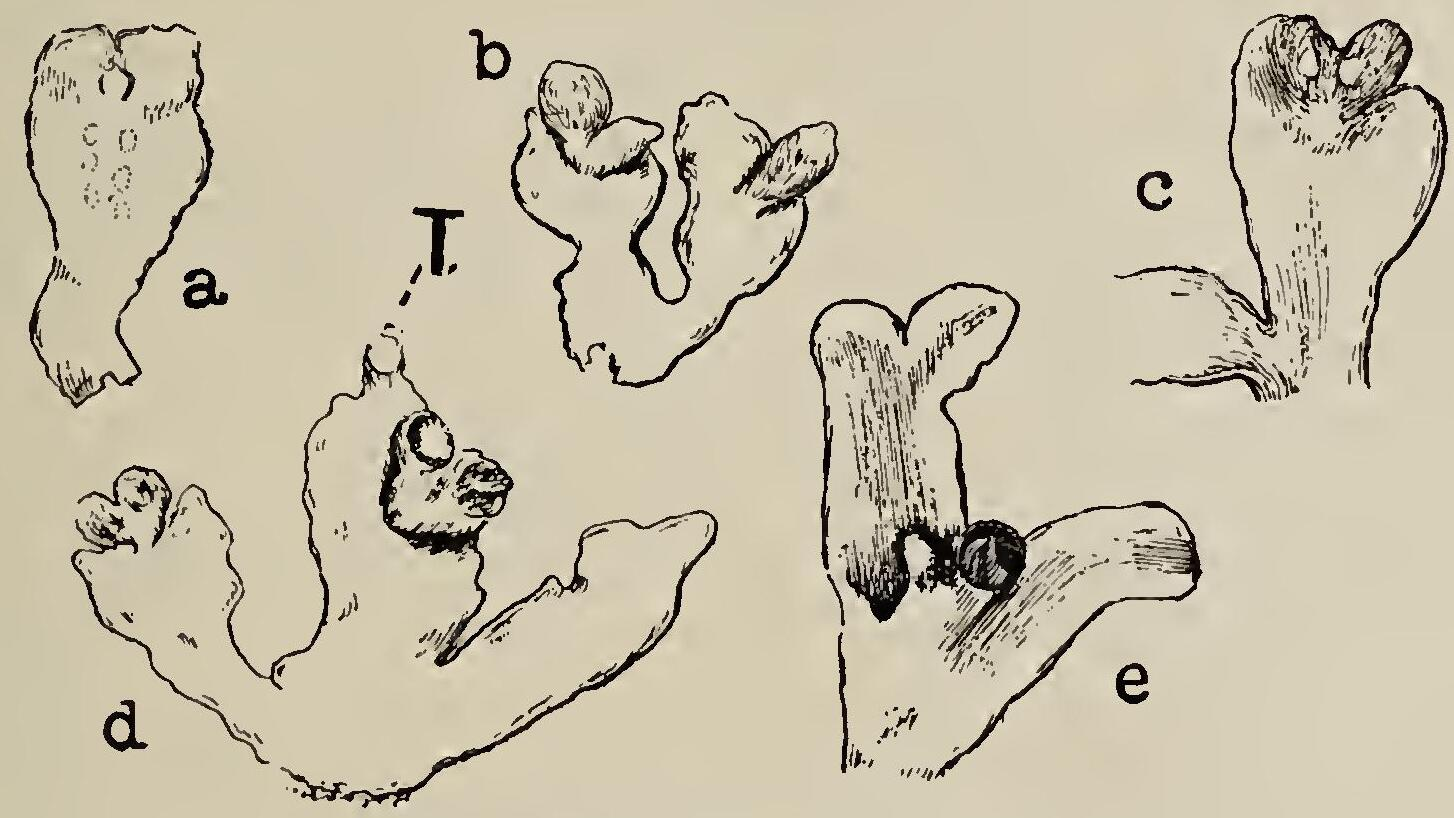
- Botanical illustration from the protologue of the genus.

Conservation status
- Endangered (IUCN 3.1)

Scientific classification
- Kingdom: Plantae
- Division: Marchantiophyta
- Class: Marchantiopsida
- Order: Marchantiales
- Family: Aitchisoniellaceae; R.M.Schust. ex T.X.Zheng & D.G.Long
- Genus: Aitchisoniella; Kashyap
- Species: A. himalayensis

Binomial name
- Aitchisoniella himalayensis Kashyap

= Aitchisoniella =

Genus of liverworts

Aitchisoniella himalayensis is a species of liverwort in the family Aitchisoniellaceae. Its natural habitats are rocky areas and cold desert of Sichuan and Himachal Pradesh. It is threatened by habitat loss.
