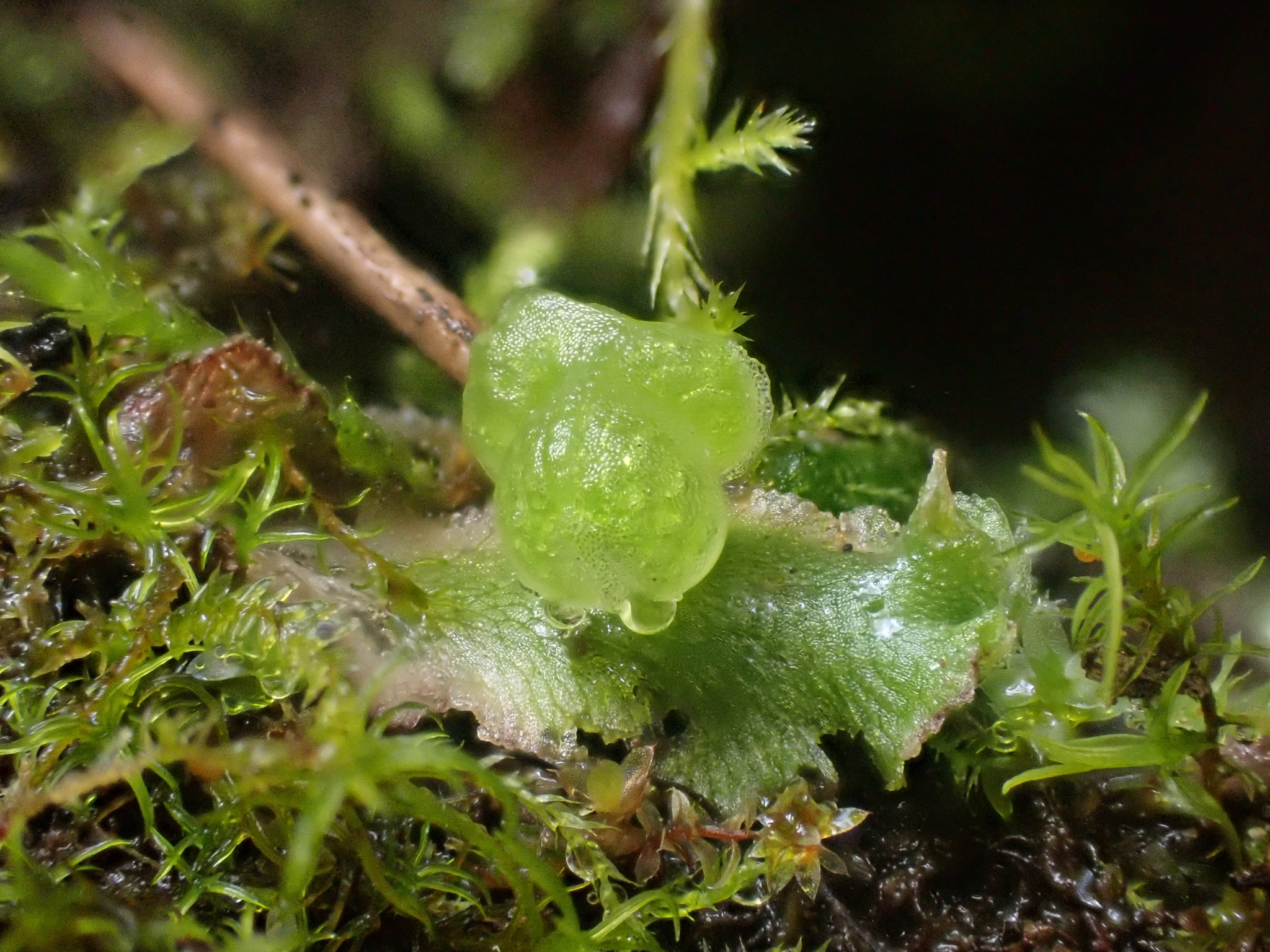
- Clevea hyalina

Scientific classification
- Kingdom: Plantae
- Division: Marchantiophyta
- Class: Marchantiopsida
- Order: Marchantiales
- Family: Cleveaceae
- Genus: Clevea; Lindb.

= Clevea =

Genus of liverworts

Clevea is a genus of liverworts belonging to the family Cleveaceae.

The genus was first described by Sextus Otto Lindberg in 1869.

The genus has almost cosmopolitan distribution.

Species:

- Clevea hyalina (Sommerf.) Lindb.
