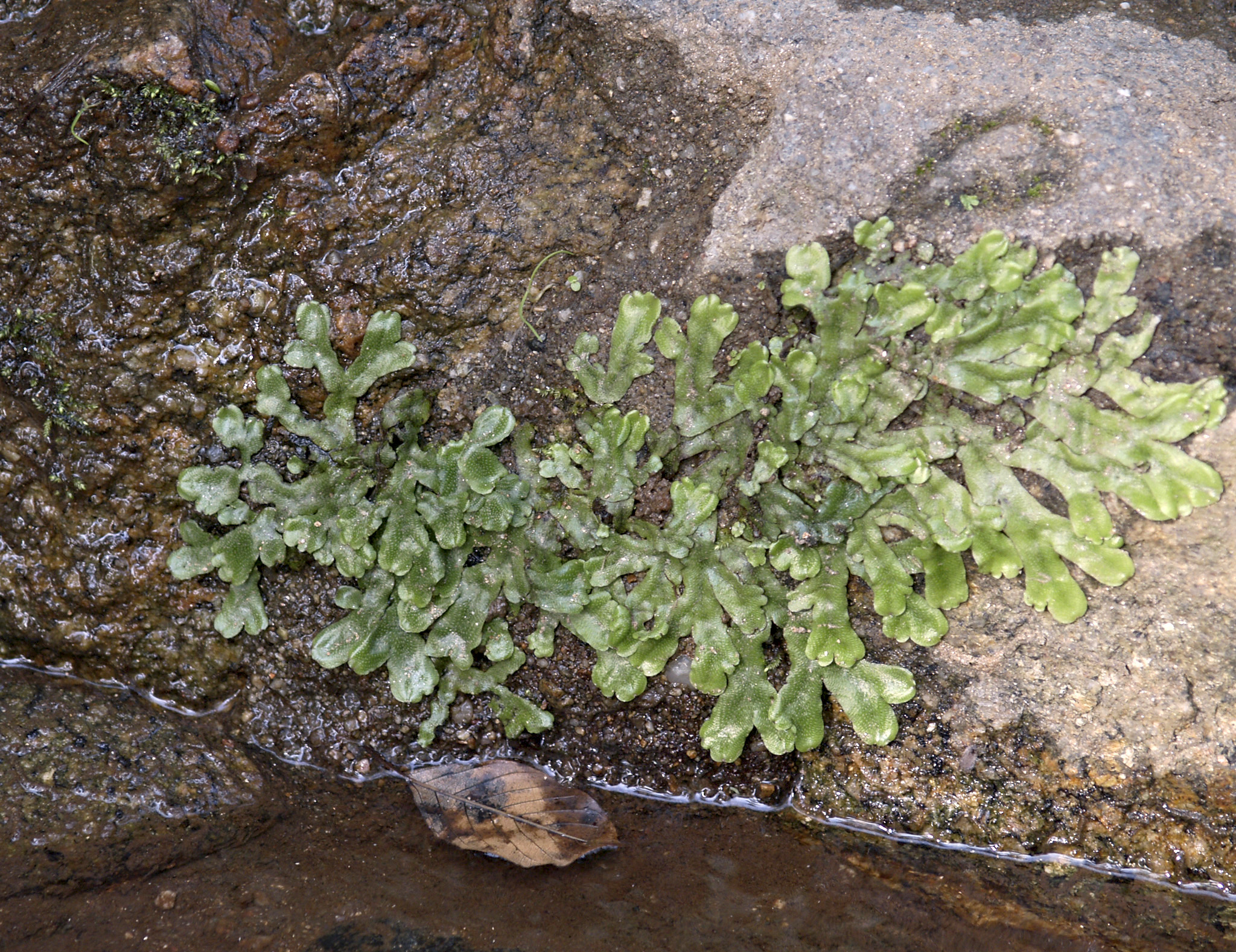
- Conocephalum conicum - a thallose liverwort

Scientific classification
- Kingdom: Plantae
- Clade: Embryophytes
- Division: Marchantiophyta
- Class: Marchantiopsida
- Subclass: Marchantiidae
- Order: Marchantiales; Limpr., 1877

Families
- See Classification

= Marchantiales =

Order of non-vascular plants known as liverworts

Marchantiales is an order of thallose liverworts (also known as "complex thalloid liverworts") that includes species like Marchantia polymorpha, a widespread plant often found beside rivers, and Lunularia cruciata, a common and often troublesome weed in moist, temperate gardens and greenhouses.

As in other bryophytes, the gametophyte generation is dominant, with the sporophyte existing as a short-lived part of the life cycle, dependent upon the gametophyte.

The genus Marchantia is often used to typify the order, although there are also many species of Asterella and species of the genus Riccia are more numerous. The majority of genera are characterized by the presence of (a) special stalked vertical branches called archegoniophores or carpocephala, and (b) sterile cells called elaters inside the sporangium.

== Phylogeny (extant Marchantiales) ==
Based on the work by Villarreal et al. 2015

- - Marchantiaceae
    Marchantia
  - - Dumortieraceae
      Dumortiera
    - - Aytoniaceae
        - Cryptomitrium
        - - Mannia
          - - Asterella
            - - Reboulia
              - Plagiochasma
      - - Cleveaceae
          - Aitchisoniella
          - - - Clevea
              - Peltolepis
            - - Athalamia
              - Sauteria
        - - - - Monocleaceae
                Monoclea
              - Conocephalaceae
                Conocephalum
            - - Oxymitraceae
                Oxymitra
              - Ricciaceae
                - Ricciocarpos
                - Riccia
          - - - Targioniaceae
                Targionia
              - Wiesnerellaceae
                Wiesnerella
            - - Monosoleniaceae
                Monosolenium
              - - Cyathodiaceae
                  Cyathodium
                - Corsiniaceae
                  - Corsinia
                  - - Stephensoniella
                    - Cronisia
                    - Exormotheca

== Phylogeny (extant and extinct Marchantiales) ==
Extinct complex thalloid liverworts are often represented by coalified compressions that preserve superficial morphological traits and do not allow exhaustively analysing their fine anatomy; though, in exceptional cases, fossils might preserve cell details.

Extinct Marchantiales - which commonly date back to the Mesozoic - can be grouped in Marchantia-like and Riccia-like fossils according to their overall morphology. While the phylogenetic relationships among many extinct and extant Marchantiales remain equivocal, it has been suggested that some fossils are closely related to extant Marchantiales.

Marchantites cyathodoides (Townrow) H. M. Anderson (Middle Triassic), for instance, is a Marchantia-like fossil whose detailed morphological characters (e.g., thallus with midrib, reduced air chambers, rhizoids and ventral scales) suggest a nested position within Marchantiales. Some Riccia-like fossils have even been assigned to families based on their overall morphology and branching patterns, such as the case of Ricciopsis sandaolingensis Li & Sun (Middle Jurassic). The first phylogenetic analyses that include both extinct and extant Marchantiales have further clarified the relationships among these taxa and have revealed new relationships among families. Likewise, the inclusion of fossils in total-evidence analyses implied that some groups of complex thalloid liverworts might be older than previously inferred.

Summary tree based on the work by Flores et al. 2020:

- Takakia ceratophylla
- Marchantiophyta
  - Haplomitriopsida
  - - Jungermanniopsida
      - - Pallaviciniites sandaolingensis +
        - Pellidae
      - - Metzgeriidae
          - Pleuroziales
          - - Metzgeriothallus sharonae +
            - Metzgeriales
        - Jungermanniidae
    - Marchantiopsida
      - Blasiidae
      - Marchantiidae
        - Neohodgsoniales
        - - - Sphaerocarpales
            - Marchantiales
              - - Lunulariaceae
                - Marchantites cyathodoides +
              - - Marchantiaceae
                  - Marchantites huolinhensis +
                  - Marchantia
                - - Dumortieraceae
                  - - Aytoniaceae
                    - - - Cleveaceae
                        - - - Wiesnerellaceae
                            - - Targioniaceae
                              - Monosoleniaceae
                          - - - Monocleaceae
                              - Conocephalaceae
                            - - - Oxymitraceae
                                - Ricciaceae
                                  - Ricciocarpos
                                  - Riccia
                                  - Ricciopsis +
                              - - Cyathodiaceae
                                - Corsiniaceae

== Origin and evolution ==
Liverworts, possess a compelling narrative of evolutionary intricacies, particularly within the realm of complex thalloid liverworts.

The genus Hepaticites, spanning Carboniferous strata of various regions, presents a puzzling case as its affiliation with the complex thalloid liverworts dependen on its individual species. Similarly, the Carboniferous Blasiites lobatus raises questions about its relationship with the Blasiales, the sister group to Marchantiales. The appearance of Marchantites loreus in the Early Permian of Russia offers the first clear evidence of the Marchantiales in the Paleozoic. However, rosette-shaped fossils that resemble Ricciaceae are as old as the Early Devonian – suggesting a much older origin for the group.

Molecular analyses, calibrated with the Triassic fossil Marchantites cyathodoides, suggest an origin for this group in the Permian or later. In contrast, total-evidence dating paints a more ancient picture, tracing the complex thalloid liverworts back to the Silurian-Devonian boundary, highlighting a narrative of morphological stability across epochs. Thus, the complex thalloid liverworts emerge as significant players in the ongoing saga of plant evolution, their history intertwined with the deep complexities of geological time.

== Classification ==
Taxonomy based on work by Söderström et al. 2016 and synonyms from Collection of genus-group names in a systematic arrangement. The order Lunulariales, proposed by Long 2006, has been recently re-included in Marchantiales as a family.

- Aytoniaceae Cavers 1911 [Rebouliaceae; Grimaldiaceae]
  - Asterella Palisot De Beauvisage 1805 [Fimbraria Nees 1820 non Fimbriaria Stackhouse 1809; Asterella section Wallichianae Long 2014; Hypenantron Corda 1829; Octokepos Griffith 1849]
  - Cryptomitrium Austin ex Underwood 1884 [Platycoaspis Lindberg 1889]
  - Mannia Corda 1829 nom. cons. [Grimaldia Raddi 1818 non Schrank 1805; Cyathophora Gray 1821 non Michelin 1843; Neesiella Schiffner 1893b; Duvalia Nees 1818 non Haworth 1812 non Bonpland 1813; Neesia Leman 1825 non Sprengel 1818; Arnelliella Massalongo 1914; Sindonisce Corda 1829]
  - Plagiochasma Lehmann & Lindenberg 1832 nom. cons. non Pomel 1883 [Aytonia Forster & Forster 1775; Ruppina Linnaeus; Rupinia (sic) Corda 1829]
  - Reboulia Raddi 1818 nom. cons.
- Cleveaceae Cavers 1911 [Sauteriaceae]
  - Athalamia Falconer 1848
  - Clevea Lindberg 1868 [Gollaniella Stephani 1905]
  - Peltolepis Lindberg 1876
  - Sauteria Nees 1838 [Sauchia Kashyap 1916]
- Conocephalaceae Müller ex Grolle 1972
  - Conocephalum Hill 1773 nom. cons. [Conicephala (sic) Wiggers 1780; Conocephalus (sic) Necker ex Dumortier 1822 non Blume 1825 non Thunberg 1815; Anthoconum Palisot De Beauvois 1804; Fegatella Raddi 1818; Hepatica Adanson 1763 non Miller 1754; Hepaticella Leman 1821; Strozzius Gray 1821; Nemoursia Merat 1840; Sandea Lindberg 1884; Conocephalum (Sandea) (Lindberg 1884) Inoue 1976]
- Corsiniaceae Engler 1892
  - Corsinia Raddi 1818 [Guentheria Leman 1821 non Sprengel 1826; Tessellina Dumortier 1822 non Dumortier 1874; Brissocarpus Lindenberg 1829]
  - Cronisia Berkeley 1857 [Carringtonia Lindberg 1868; Funicularia Trevisan 1877; Boschia Montagne 1856 non Korthals 1844; Myriorrhynchus Lindberg 1884]
- Cyathodiaceae Stotler & Crandall-Stotler 2000
  - Cyathodium Kunze ex Lehmann 1834 [Synhymenium Griffith 1849; Synymenium (sic) Hagen 1910; Cyathodium (Metacyathodium) Srivastava & Dixit 1996]
- Dumortieraceae Long 2006
  - Dumortiera Nees 1824
- Exormothecaceae Müller ex Grolle 1972
  - Aitchisoniella Kashyap 1914
  - Exormotheca Mitten 1870 [Corbierella Douin & Trabut 1919]
  - Stephensoniella Kashyap 1914 non Cernosvitov 1934 non Lastochkin 1935
- Lunulariaceae Klingrräff 1858
  - Lunularia Adanson 1763
- Marchantiaceae Lindley 1836
  - Marchantia Linnaeus 1753 [Chlamidium Corda 1828; Marchantiopsis Gao & Chang 1982 non Douin & Douin 1918]
- Monocleaceae Frank 1877
  - Monoclea Hooker 1820
- Monosoleniaceae Inoue 1966
  - Monosolenium Griffith 1849 [Dumortieropsis Horikawa 1934]
- Oxymitraceae Müller ex Grolle 1972
  - Oxymitra Bischoff ex Lindenberg 1829 non (Blume) Hooker & Thomson 1855 [Pycnoscenus Lindberg 1863; Tessellina Dumortier 1874 non Dumortier 1822]
- Ricciaceae Reichenbach 1828
  - Riccia Linnaeus 1753 [Hemiseuma (Bischoff) von Klinggraeff 1858; Riccia section Hemiseuma Bischoff; Hemiseumata Bischoff Lindley 1847; Riccia (Pteroriccia) (Schuster 1984) Schuster 1985; Pteroriccia Schuster 1984; Thallocarpus Lindberg 1874a; Cryptocarpus Austin 1869 non Kunth 1817 non Dozy & Molk. ex Dozy & Molk. 1846; Angiocarpus Trevisan 1877; Ricciella Braun 1821; Riccinia Trabut 1916]
  - Ricciocarpos Corda 1829 [Euriccia Lacouture 1905; Lichenoides Lindley 1847 non Hoffmann 1789 non Barrande 1846; Lemna Rafinesque 1817 non Linnaeus 1753]
- Targioniaceae Dumortier 1829
  - Targionia Linnaeus 1753 non non Hesse 1923
- Wiesnerellaceae Inoue 1976
  - Wiesnerella Schiffner 1896
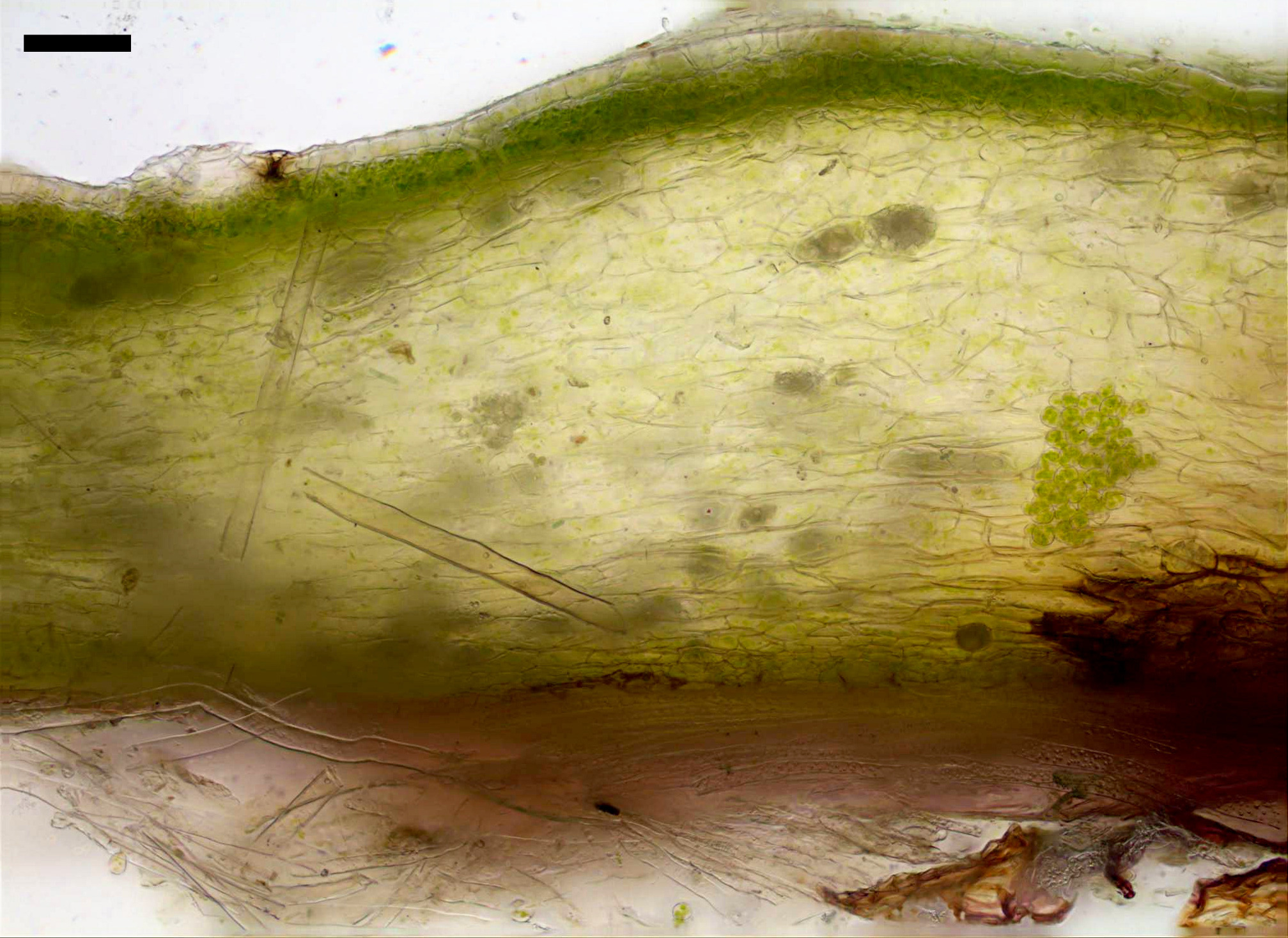
Cross section through a marchantialian thallus.
