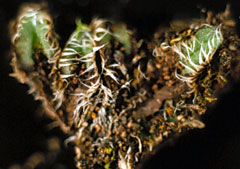

Scientific classification
- Kingdom: Plantae
- Division: Marchantiophyta
- Class: Marchantiopsida
- Order: Marchantiales
- Family: Ricciaceae; Müll.Frib. ex Grolle
- Genus: Oxymitra; Bisch. ex Lindenb.

Species
- Oxymitra cristata Oxymitra paleacea

Synonyms
- Rupinia Corda; Tessellina

= Oxymitra =

Genus of liverworts

Oxymitra is the only genus in the liverwort family Oxymitraceae, in the order Marchantiales. The genus includes two or three species.

The species Oxymitra paleacea occurs in Europe, South America and North America (Texas, Oklahoma, Kansas and Missouri, on sandstone or igneous substrates). North American plants have sometimes been considered a separate species O. androgyna, but they have more often been included in a wider definition of O. paleacea. The species Oxymitra cristata is found in South Africa.
