= Wiesnerella =

Scientific classification
- Kingdom: Plantae
- Division: Marchantiophyta
- Class: Marchantiopsida
- Order: Marchantiales
- Family: Wiesnerellaceae; Inoue
- Genus: Wiesnerella; Schiffn.

Species
- Wiesnerella denudata (Mitt.) Steph.

Synonyms
- W. denudata: Dumortiera denudata Mitt.; Wiesnerella javanica Schiffn.; Wiesnerella fasciaria C.Gao & K.C.Chang

Genus of liverworts

Wiesnerella is the only genus in the liverwort family Wiesnerellaceae, in the order Marchantiales. It contains one species: Wiesnerella denudata.
