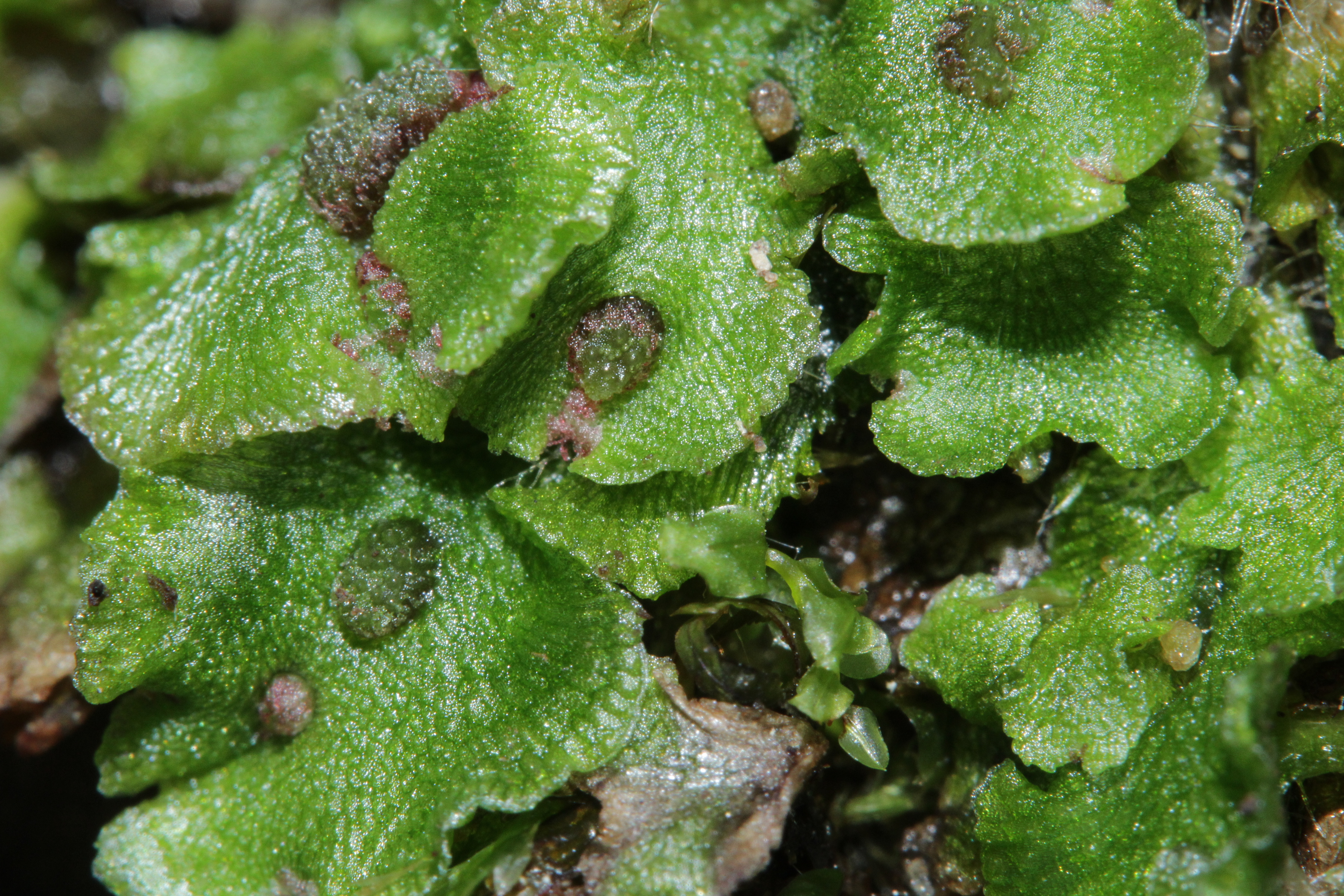
- Peltolepis quadrata

Scientific classification
- Kingdom: Plantae
- Division: Marchantiophyta
- Class: Marchantiopsida
- Order: Marchantiales
- Family: Cleveaceae; Cavers

= Cleveaceae =

Family of liverworts

Cleveaceae is a family of liverworts belonging to the order Marchantiales.

Genera:

- Athalamia Falc.
- Clevea Lindb.
- Peltolepis Lindb.
- Sauteria Nees
