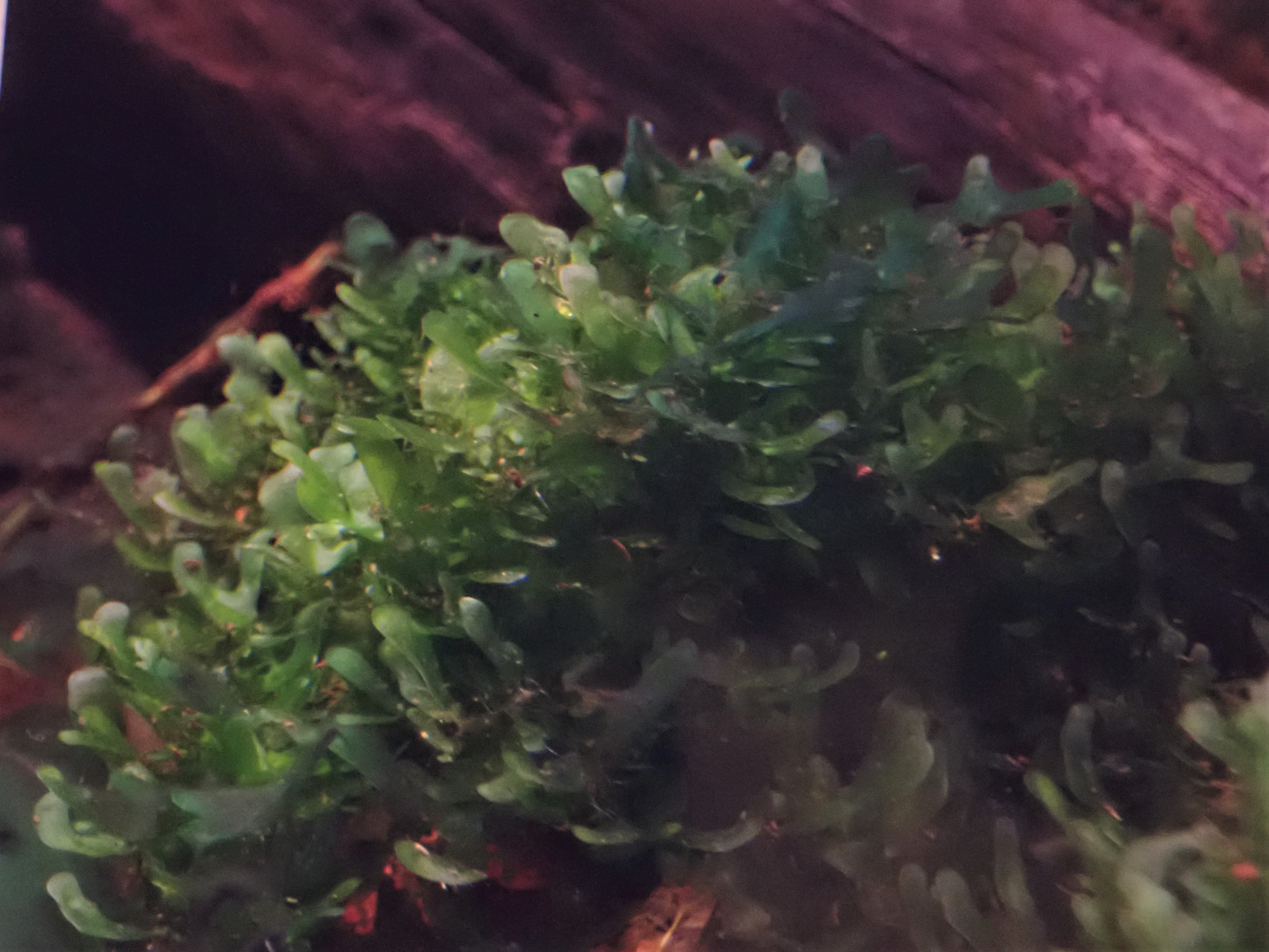

Scientific classification
- Kingdom: Plantae
- Division: Marchantiophyta
- Class: Marchantiopsida
- Order: Marchantiales
- Family: Monosoleniaceae; Inoue
- Genus: Monosolenium; Griff.
- Species: M. tenerum

Binomial name
- Monosolenium tenerum Griff.
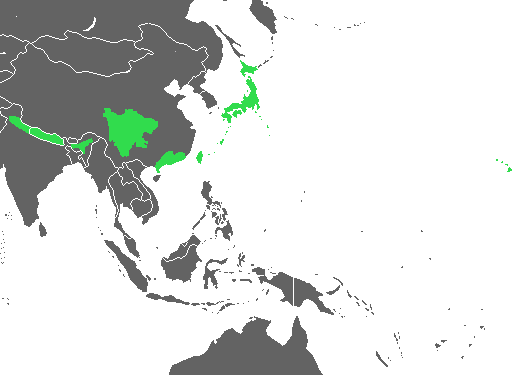
- Approximate distribution map of Monosolenium. Green indicates presence.

Synonyms
- Cyathodium tenerum Steph.; Dumortieropsis liukiuensis Horik.

= Monosolenium =

Genus of liverworts

Monosolenium tenerum, is a weedy species of liverwort found in east Asia. It is the only species in the genus Monosolenium and the family Monosoleniaceae. It is commonly confused with similar-looking plants in the aquarium trade like Pellia liverworts and Süsswassertang, a fern gametophyte.

== Ecology ==
Monosolenium tenerum is a terrestrial plant, growing on moist, shady soil, sometimes in association with Marchantia palmata. The species has an east Asiatic distribution. It has been found in east India (Assam, Himachal Pradesh, & Uttarakhand), Nepal, China (northwestern Sichuan, Guangdong, & Macau), Taiwan, as well as the Ryukyu Islands, Japan, and Hawaii. All areas where the plant grows are subtropical or temperate regions with mesic habitats, where there is ample supply of moisture. Perhaps it is because the species grows in such mesic climates that the thallus (plant body) has become simplified, since the chambered internal anatomy of other Marchantiales seems adapted to a climate with periodic drying and an unreliable water supply.

The species is able to exploit high levels of nitrogen in surface soil to achieve local dominance. It is therefore most common in areas inhabited by man, where the nitrogen levels have been artificially elevated, such as by the application of fertilizers. Occurrences in the wild are rare, but plants are not uncommon in populated areas. Schuster notes:

In Japan the incidence of this species has declined in the countryside in recent decades—after adoption of modern plumbing. When the old-fashioned privy was current, Monosolenium was a common "weed," as, e.g., around the privies in the periphery of the Mossy Temple at Kyoto...and in settled areas. The plant apparently hardly occurs "wild" and always seems associated with man—much like that other east Asiatic monotype, Ginkgo biloba. It is of interest that this plant, "lost" for decades, appeared on fertilized soil in a greenhouse in Munich, giving Goebel the opportunity to carefully investigate the taxon.

Monosolenium has been red-listed as a vulnerable species in Japan. It also is extremely rare in India, where it is confined to altitudes between about 550 to 1000 m in the sub-Himalayas, as a result of habitat destruction). However, Monosolenium is common in other countries where it occurs.

== Economic uses ==
A plant sold as Monosolenium tenerum and commonly called Pellia or Pelia has been made popular as a freshwater aquarium plant by Tropica is now being sold as Monosolenium tenerum. A similar looking plant, known in the hobby as "Süsswassertang" is often sold under the name Round Pellia or Round Pelia, but neither of these names is correct. Süsswassertang is now known to be the gametophyte of a species of fern, in the genus Lomariopsis.
