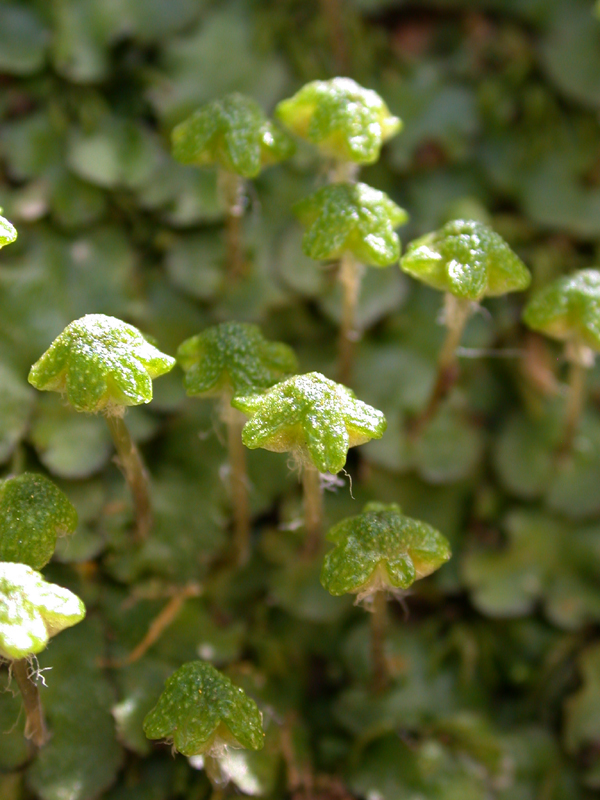

Scientific classification
- Kingdom: Plantae
- Division: Marchantiophyta
- Class: Marchantiopsida
- Order: Marchantiales
- Family: Aytoniaceae
- Genus: Reboulia; Raddi 1818, nom. cons.
- Species: R. hemisphaerica

Binomial name
- Reboulia hemisphaerica (L.) Raddi

Synonyms
- Asterella hemisphaerica Beauv.; Grimaldia hemisphaerica Lindenb.; Marchantia hemisphaerica L.; Reboulia queenslandica (Stephani) M. Hicks

= Reboulia =

Genus of liverworts

Reboulia hemisphaerica, the hemisphaeric liverwort or small mushroom-headed liverwort, is the only species of liverwort in the genus Reboulia.

A possible second species Reboulia queenslandica (Stephani) M. Hicks was published in 1992, but it was later determined to be a polyploid cross between two varieties of R. hemisphaerica, so not a distinct species. Subsequent lists and publications do not recognize it as distinct.

Riccardin C is a phenolic cyclic bibenzyl secondary metabolite isolated from R. hemisphaerica, as is marchantinquinone.
