= Targioniina =

Scientific classification
- Domain: Eukaryota
- Kingdom: Animalia
- Phylum: Arthropoda
- Class: Insecta
- Order: Hemiptera
- Suborder: Sternorrhyncha
- Family: Diaspididae
- Subfamily: Aspidiotinae
- Tribe: Aspidiotini
- Subtribe: Targioniina

Subtribe of true bugs

Targioniina is a subtribe of armored scale insects.

== Genera ==
- Fisanotargionia
- Genistaspis
- Schizotargionia
- Targaspidiotus
- Targionia
- Targionidea
