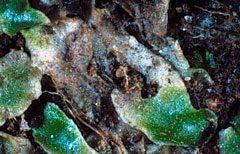
- Corsinia coriandrina

Scientific classification
- Kingdom: Plantae
- Division: Marchantiophyta
- Class: Marchantiopsida
- Order: Marchantiales
- Family: Corsiniaceae; Engl., 1892

Genera
- Corsinia; Cronisia

= Corsiniaceae =

Family of liverworts (primitive plants)

Corsiniaceae is a family of liverworts in the order Marchantiales. Being bryophytic, they are non-vascular. The function of absorption and anchorage is performed by filamentous structures rhizoids.

== Genera in the family Corsiniaceae ==
- Corsinia
- Cronisia
