= Halosulfuron-methyl =

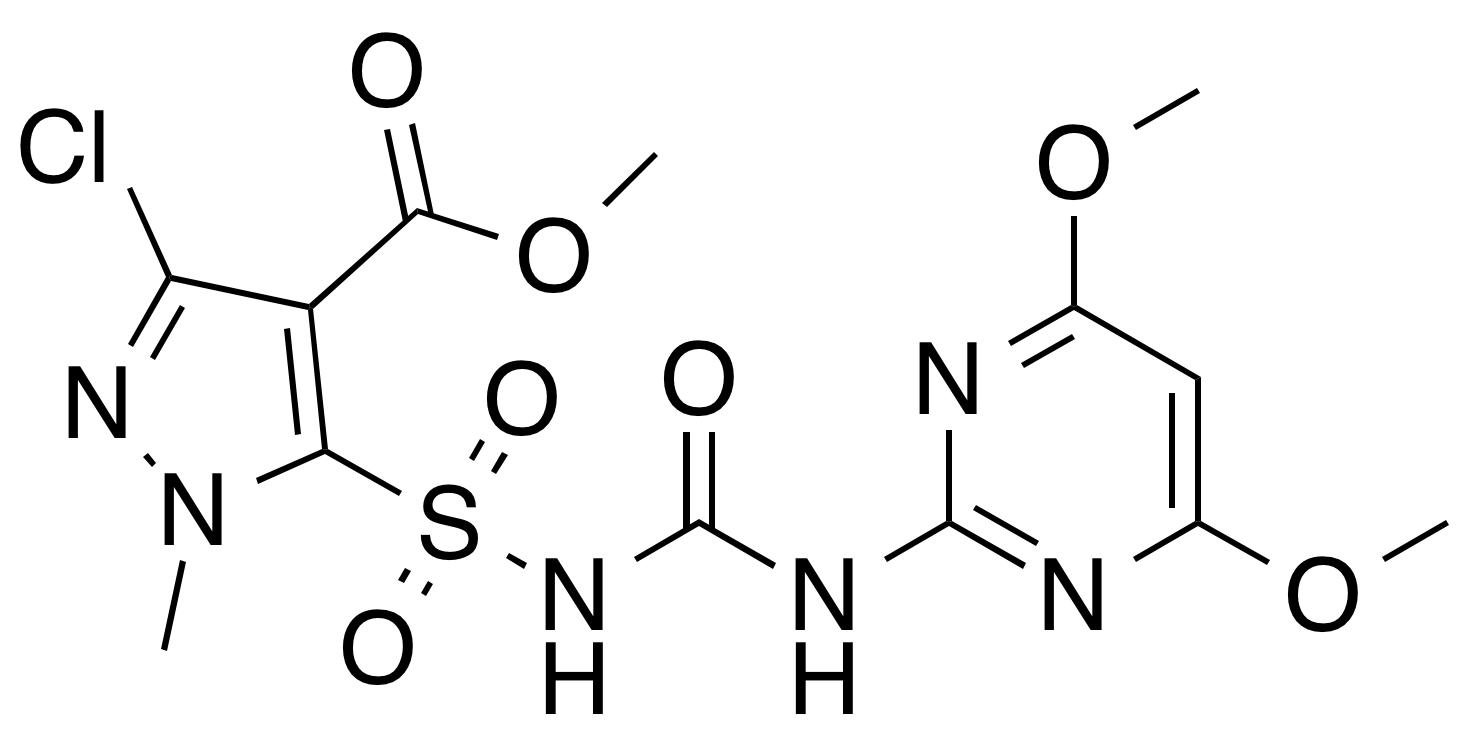

Names
- Preferred IUPAC name Methyl 3-chloro-5-{[(4,6-dimethoxypyrimidin-2-yl)carbamoyl]sulfamoyl}-1-methyl-1H-pyrazole-4-carboxylate

Identifiers
CAS Number	100784-20-1
3D model (JSmol)	Interactive image
Beilstein Reference	7783327
ChEMBL	ChEMBL2140532
ChemSpider	82861
ECHA InfoCard	100.117.125
EC Number	600-130-3
KEGG	C18442
PubChem CID	91763
UNII	W1CP17GD87
CompTox Dashboard (EPA)	DTXSID9034650
- InChI: InChI=1S/C13H15ClN6O7S/c1-20-10(8(9(14)18-20)11(21)27-4)28(23,24)19-13(22)17-12-15-6(25-2)5-7(16-12)26-3/h5H,1-4H3,(H2,15,16,17,19,22) Key: FMGZEUWROYGLAY-UHFFFAOYSA-N
- SMILES: CN1C(=C(C(=N1)Cl)C(=O)OC)S(=O)(=O)NC(=O)NC2=NC(=CC(=N2)OC)OC

Properties
Chemical formula	C_{13}H_{15}ClN_{6}O_{7}S
Molar mass	434.81 g·mol^{−1}
Density	1.62 g/cm^{3}
Melting point	175.5–177.2 °C (347.9–351.0 °F; 448.6–450.3 K)

Hazards
- GHS labelling
Pictograms	(GHS08: Health hazard) (GHS09: Environmental hazard)
Signal word	Danger
Hazard statements	H360D, H410
Precautionary statements	P203, P273, P280, P318, P391, P405, P501
- Except where otherwise noted, data are given for materials in their standard state (at 25 °C [77 °F], 100 kPa). Infobox references

Halosulfuron-methyl is a sulfonylurea post-emergence herbicide used to control some annual and perennial broad-leaved weeds and sedges (such as nutsedge/nutgrass) in a range of crops (particularly rice), established landscape woody ornamentals and turfgrass. It is marketed under several tradenames including Sedgehammer and Sandea.

Halosulfuron-methyl's HRAC classification is Group B (global, Aus), Group 2 (numeric), as it inhibits acetohydroxyacid synthase.

== Effects ==
Halosulfuron-methyl is systemic and selective, and acts as an inhibitor of acetohydroxyacid synthase (AHAS, also known as acetolactate synthase) restricting the biosynthesis of the essential amino acids, valine and isoleucine, thus restricting plant growth. Symptoms take several weeks to develop and include general stunting, chlorosis, and necrosis of the growing points. It typically does not affect other major annual and perennial weed grasses and broadleaves such as spurge, dandelions, lambsquarters, and oxalis.
