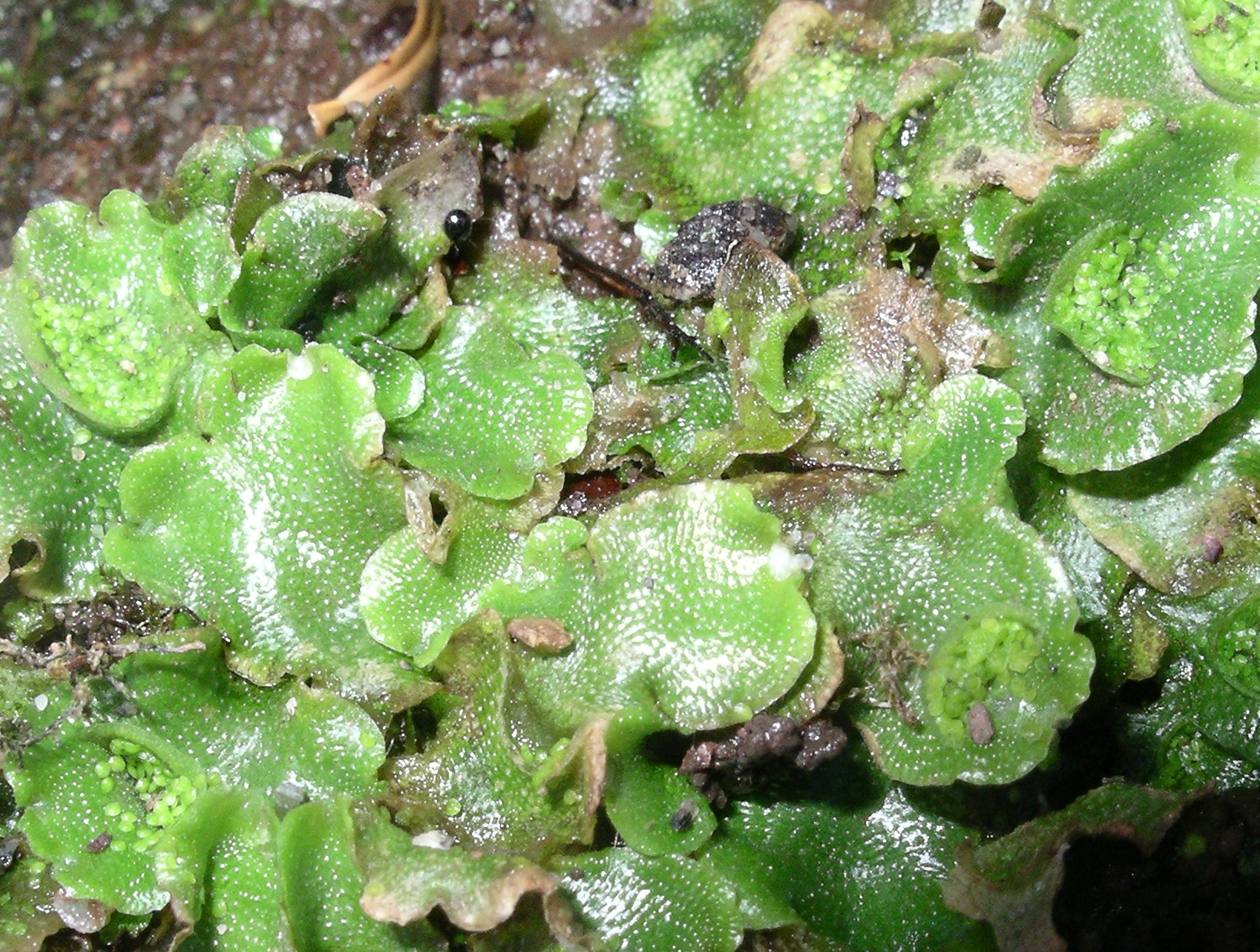

Scientific classification
- Kingdom: Plantae
- Clade: Embryophytes
- Division: Marchantiophyta
- Class: Marchantiopsida
- Order: Lunulariales; H.Klinggr.
- Family: Lunulariaceae; H.Klinggr.
- Genus: Lunularia; Adans.
- Species: L. cruciata

Binomial name
- Lunularia cruciata (L.) Dumort. ex Lindb.

Synonyms
- Selenia Hill non Nutt.; Staurophora Willdenow; Dichominum Neck. ex Trevisan; Marsilia Kuntze non Linnaeus; Sedgwickia Bowdich non Wall. & Griff.

= Lunularia =

Species of liverwort

Lunularia is a genus of liverworts whose only species is Lunularia cruciata, the crescent-cup liverwort. Lunularia is either the only genus in the order Lunulariales, or may be placed in the order Marchantiales. The name, from Latin luna, moon, refers to the moon-shaped gemma cups.

== Description ==
Lunularia cruciata grows large, dichotomously branched green thalli with crescent shaped gemma cups containing disc-like gemmae. This is a unique morphological characteristic not possessed by other thalloid liverworts. Its thallus surface is shiny, faintly lined, and is dotted with tiny air pores. When dried the thallus turns yellowish in color and its margin rolls inward.

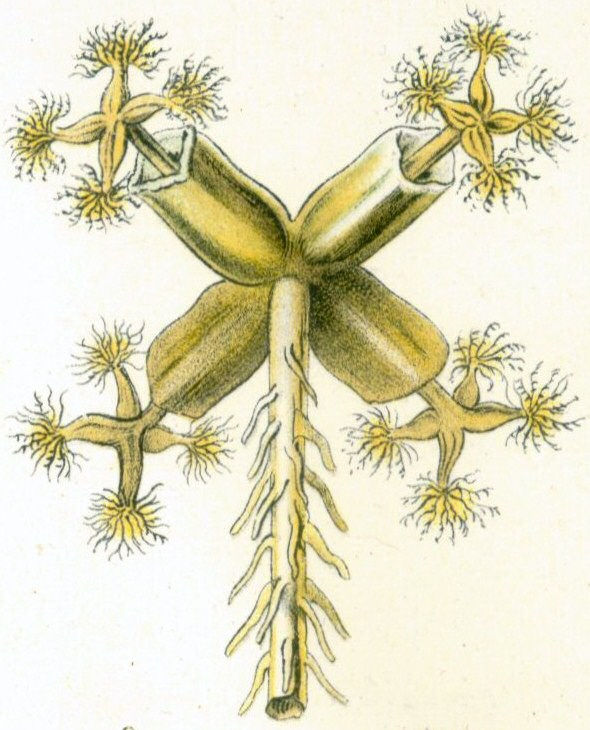
Lunularia can also reproduce sexually, as illustrated by Haeckel in this drawing of an archegonial head with (diploid) sporophyte plantlets. The main plant body (thallus) is haploid

As in other liverworts, the main plant body or thallus is a haploid gametophyte. The antheridia of L. cruciata develops in early spring, the archegonia develops in spring and sporophytes develop in late summer. However, records of sporophyte developments and sexual reproduction are rare and scattered. This was suspected to have been the result of the anthropogenic spreading of this species, causing a disjunctive distribution of antheridia and archegonia. When reproducing sexually, the four archegonia is arranged in a cross-shaped head (hence the specific name cruciata) bearing diploid sporophyte plantlets. When reproducing asexually, the disc-shaped gemmae are readily dislodged from the cups by splashes of rainwater. They can then quickly "take root" and start to grow in suitably damp places, which is why they are so successful in greenhouses.

== Distribution ==
Lunularia cruciata is distributed across the world, found in continents including Europe, Australasia, Asia, the Americas, and Africa. It occurs commonly in western Europe, and is native to the Mediterranean region, where the morphological forms from sexual reproduction are more frequently found there. It is also common in California, where it now grows "wild", and is known as an introduced weed in gardens and greenhouses in Australia. Ella Orr Campbell believed that L. cruciata was introduced into New Zealand sometime after 1867. The sporophytes of L. cruciata are rare, but has been found in European regions, as well as in South Africa, Argentina, California, India, Japan and New Zealand.

== Habitat and ecology ==
Lunularia cruciata grows in damp, shaded and disturbed habitats such as path and wall edges. It can act as a nutrient indicator because it often grows in alkaline and eutrophic to highly eutrophic soil. Other habitats include loam, boulders, concrete, exposed tree roots, soil covered logs and in the gaps between sidewalk stones. L. cruciata also grows as a horticultural weed in gardens, greenhouses and parks. L. cruciata is sensitive to frost, and is often found near water, where its gemmae are washed ashore.

== Chemical properties ==
Like many other liverwort species, L. cruciata produces a dihydrostilbenoid growth hormone, lunularic acid, that is reported to be a growth inhibitor of liverworts. Cadmium in this liverwort also inhibits gemma germination and apical thallus growth, as well as altering cell and chloroplast structure. Acetone extracts from L. cruciata were tested and showed antibacterial properties, but had no effects against fungal activity.
