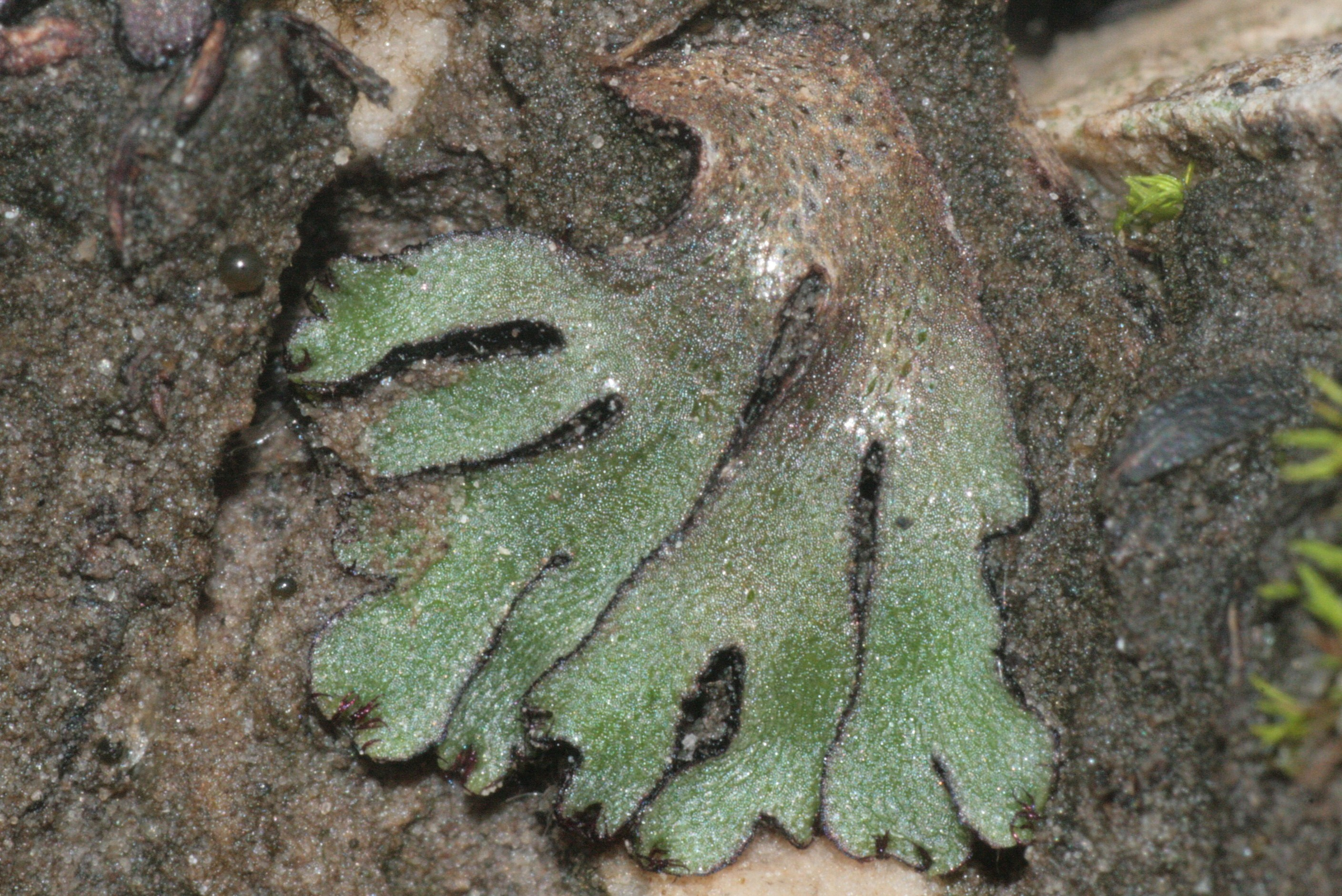
- Mannia triandra

Scientific classification
- Kingdom: Plantae
- Division: Marchantiophyta
- Class: Marchantiopsida
- Order: Marchantiales
- Family: Aytoniaceae
- Genus: Mannia; Opiz

Synonyms
- Duvalia Nees; Grimaldia Raddi; Cyathophora Gray; Neesia Léman; Sindonisce Corda; Duvaliella Borbás; Neesiella Schiffn.; Arnelliella C.Massal.

= Mannia =

Genus of liverworts

Mannia is a genus of liverworts belonging to the family Aytoniaceae. It has a cosmopolitan distribution.

== Species ==
The following species are recognised in the genus Mannia:

- Mannia androgyna (L.) A. Evans
- Mannia californica (Gottsche) L.C. Wheeler
- Mannia controversa (Meyl.) D.B. Schill
- Mannia fragrans (Balb.) Frye & L. Clark
- Mannia gracilis (F. Weber) D.B. Schill & D.G. Long
- Mannia hegewaldii Bischl.
- Mannia paradoxa R.M. Schust.
- Mannia perssonii Udar & V. Chandra
- Mannia pilosa (Hornem.) Frye & L. Clark
- Mannia sibirica (Müll. Frib.) Frye & L. Clark
- Mannia triandra (Scop.) Grolle
