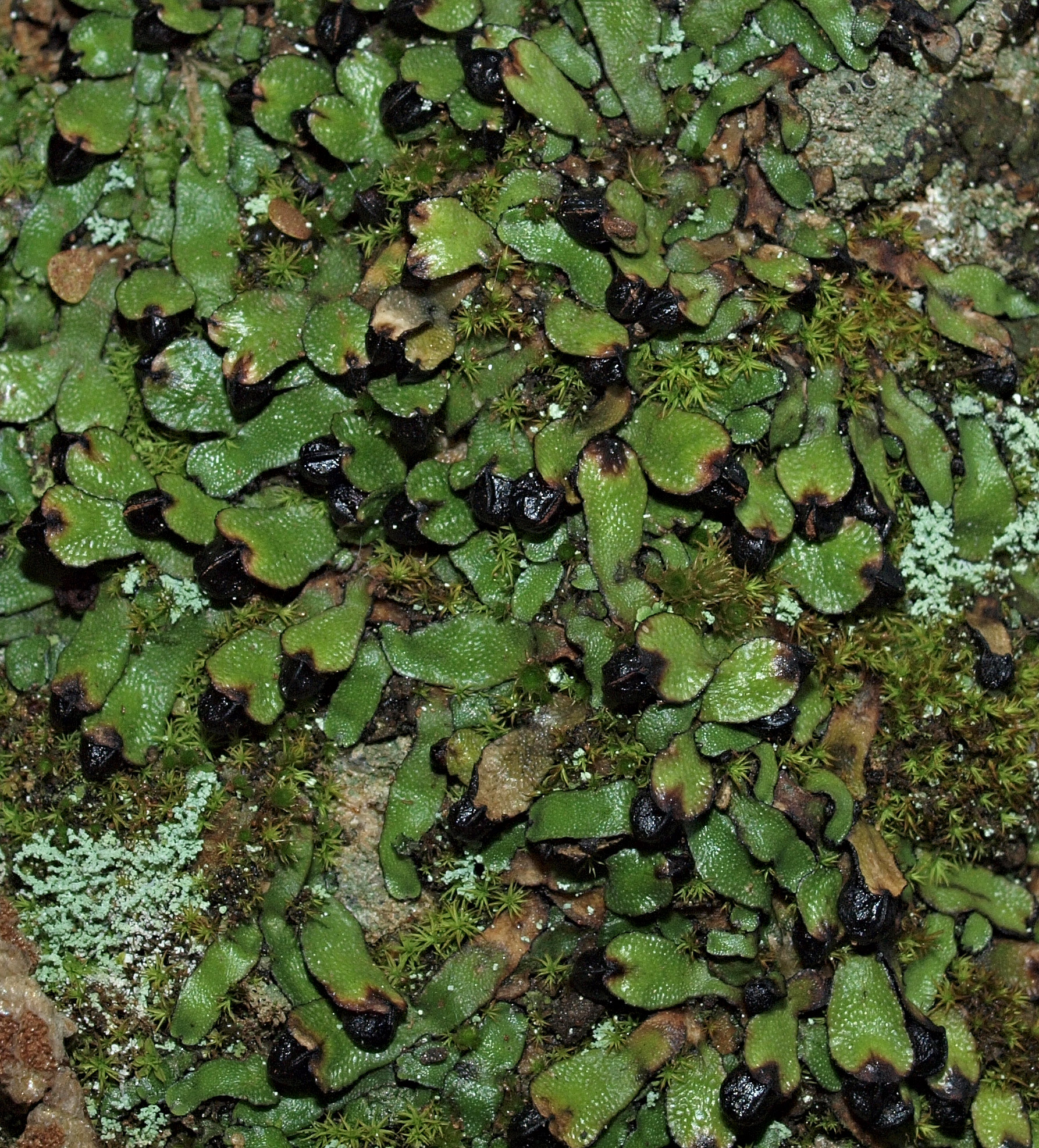
- Targionia hypophylla

Scientific classification
- Kingdom: Plantae
- Division: Marchantiophyta
- Class: Marchantiopsida
- Order: Marchantiales
- Family: Targioniaceae; Dumort.
- Genus: Targionia [ Micheli ] L., 1753

Species
- Targionia elongata Targionia hypophylla Targionia lorbeeriana Targionia stellaris

= Targionia (plant) =

Genus of liverworts

Targionia is a genus of liverworts in the order Marchantiales. It the only genus in the family Targioniaceae within that order. This genus has worldwide distribution in areas with a Mediterranean climate. That is, in regions with hot dry summers and cool wet winters.

== Species in Targionia ==
- Targionia elongata
- Targionia hypophylla
- Targionia lorbeeriana
- Targionia stellaris
