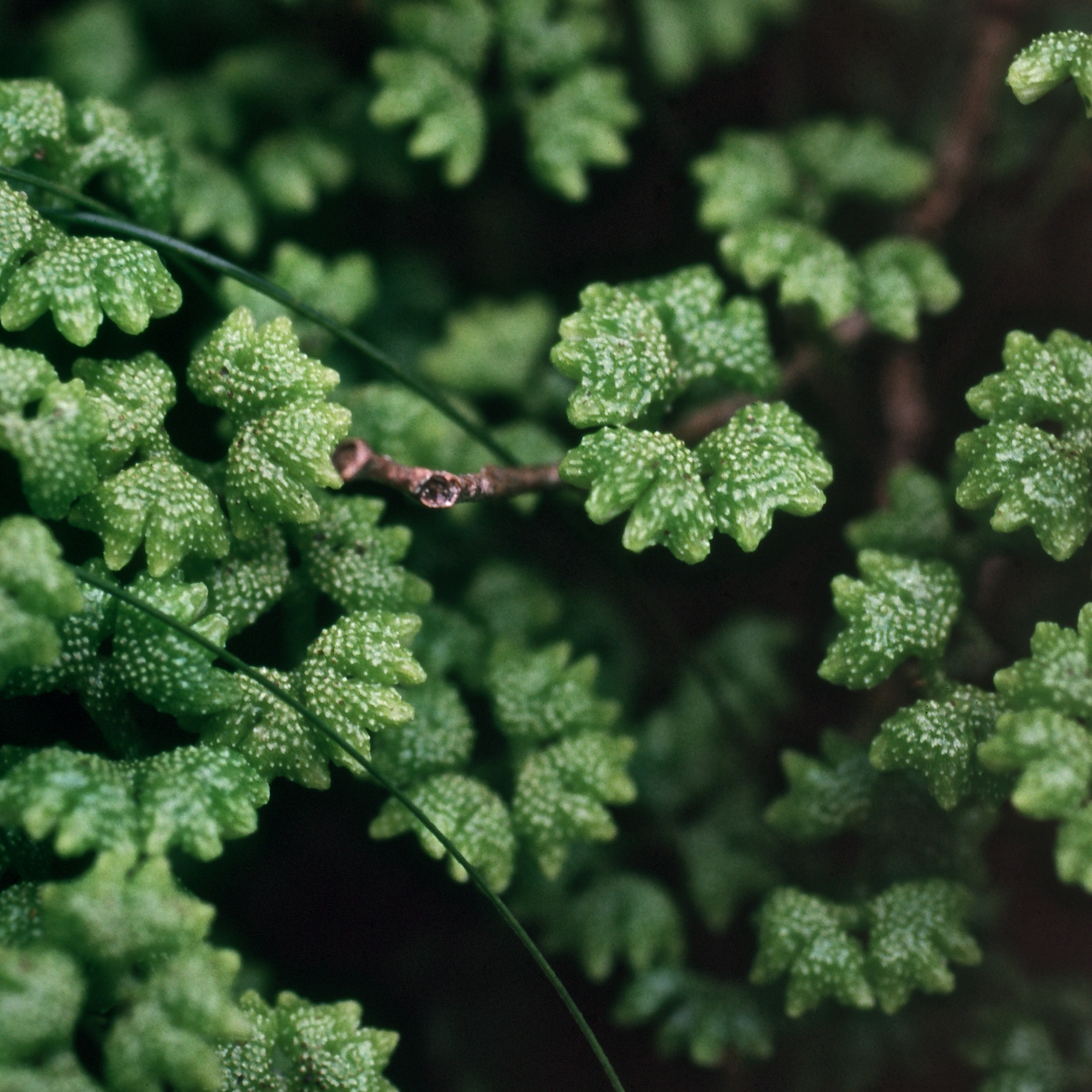

Scientific classification
- Kingdom: Plantae
- Division: Marchantiophyta
- Class: Marchantiopsida
- Subclass: Marchantiidae
- Order: Neohodgsoniales; D.G.Long 2006
- Family: Neohodgsoniaceae; D.G.Long 2006
- Genus: Neohodgsonia; Perss.
- Species: N. mirabilis

Binomial name
- Neohodgsonia mirabilis (Perss.) Perss.

Synonyms
- Hodgsonia Persson 1953 non Hooker & Thomson 1854 non von Müller 1860 non Schimkewitsch 1929; Hodgsonia mirabilis Persson 1953

= Neohodgsonia =

Genus of liverworts

Neohodgsonia is a genus of liverworts containing the single species Neohodgsonia mirabilis. Neohodgsonia is the only genus in the family Neohodgsoniaceae, which is the only family in the order Neohodgsoniales.
