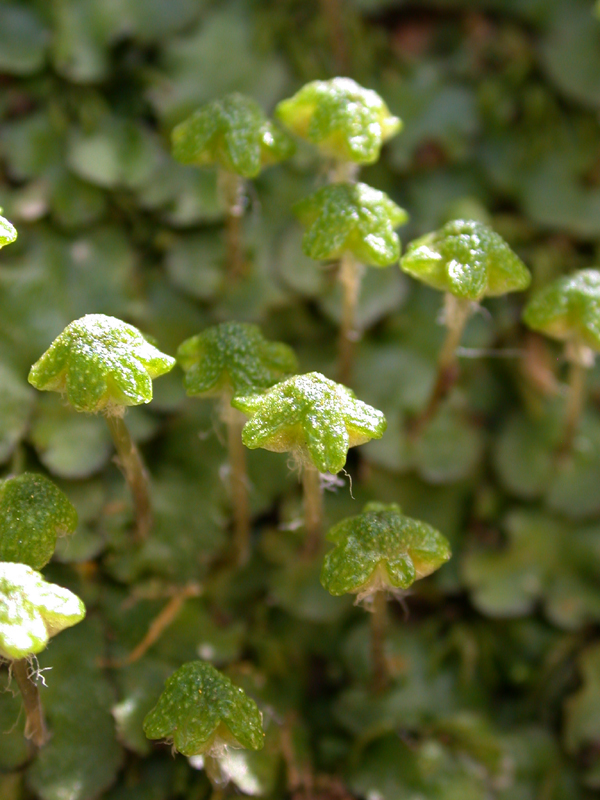
- Reboulia hemisphaerica

Scientific classification
- Kingdom: Plantae
- Division: Marchantiophyta
- Class: Marchantiopsida
- Order: Marchantiales
- Family: Aytoniaceae; Cavers, 1911

Genera
- See text

Synonyms
- Grimaldiaceae Reichenb. ex Rabenh.) K. Müll., 1940; Rebouliaceae Evans 1923

= Aytoniaceae =

Family of liverworts

Aytoniaceae is a family of liverworts in the order Marchantiales.

== Genera ==
- Asterella Palisot De Beauvisage 1805 non Saccardo 1891 non Hara 1936 non Sollas 1886
- Cryptomitrium Austin ex Underwood 1884
- Mannia Corda 1829
- Plagiochasma Lehmann & Lindenberg 1832 nom. cons. non Pomel 1883
- Reboulia Raddi 1818 nom. cons.
