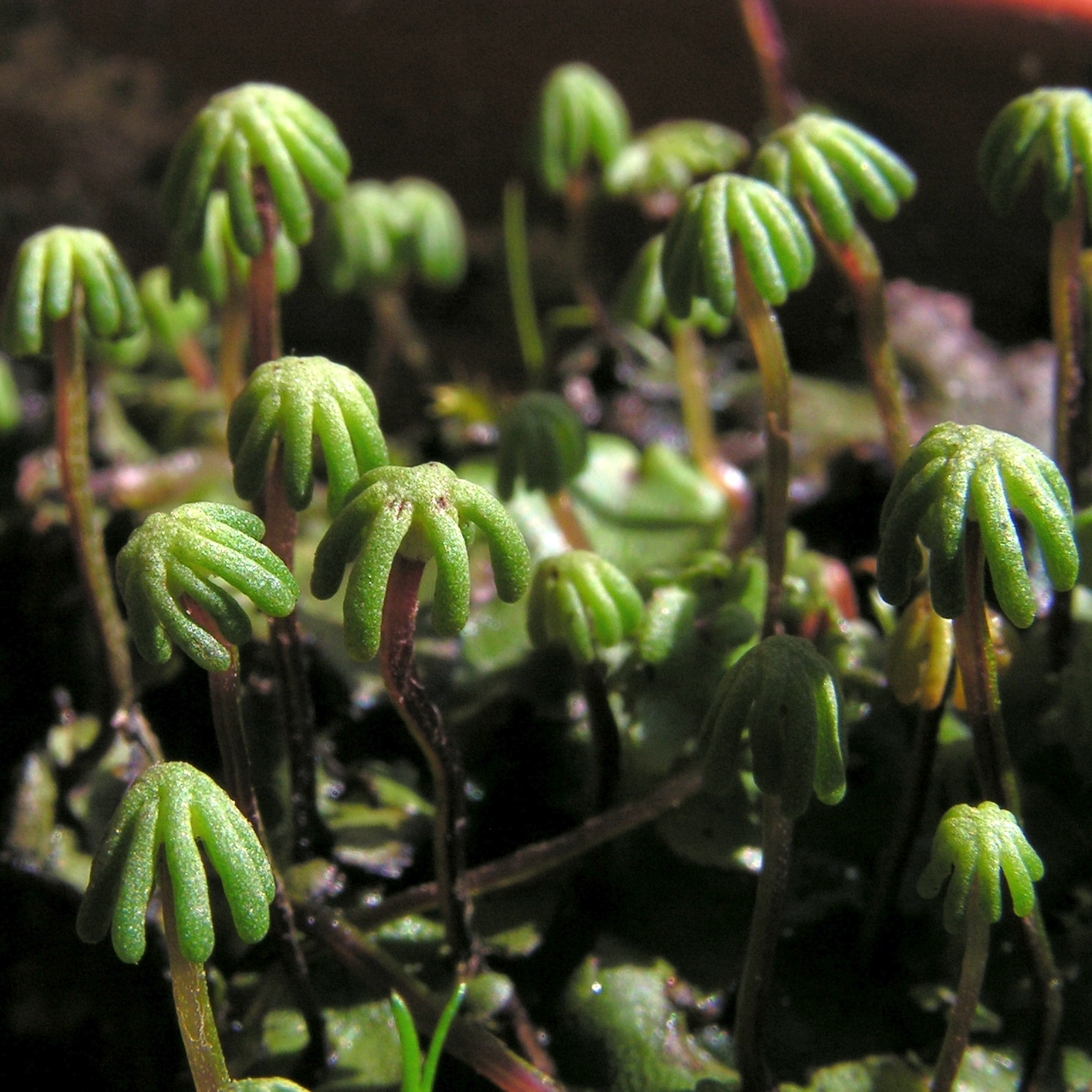
- Marchantia polymorpha

Scientific classification
- Kingdom: Plantae
- Division: Marchantiophyta
- Class: Marchantiopsida; Cronquist, Takht. et W.Zimm., 1966

Orders
- Blasiidae: Blasiales; Marchantiidae: Lunulariales; Marchantiales (complex thalloids); Neohodgsoniales; Sphaerocarpales (bottle liverworts)

= Marchantiopsida =

Class of liverworts

Marchantiopsida is a class of liverworts within the phylum Marchantiophyta. The species in this class are known as complex thalloid liverworts. The species in this class are widely distributed and can be found worldwide. Complex oil bodies are only found in the gametophyte.

== Taxonomy ==
- Blasiidae He-Nygrén et al. 2006
  - Blasiales Stotl. & Crand.-Stotl. 2000
    - Blasiaceae H.Klinggr. 1858
    - †Treubiitaceae Schuster 1980
- Marchantiidae Engl. 1893 sensu He-Nygrén et al. 2006
  - Lunulariales H.Klinggr. 2006
    - Lunulariaceae H.Klinggr. 1858
  - Marchantiales Limpr. 1877 (complex thalloids)
    - Aytoniaceae Cavers 1911 [Rebouliaceae; Grimaldiaceae]
    - Cleveaceae Cavers 1911 [Sauteriaceae]
    - Conocephalaceae Müll.Frib. ex Grolle 1972
    - Corsiniaceae Engl. 1892
    - Cyathodiaceae Stotler & Crand.-Stotl. 2000
    - Dumortieraceae Long 2006
    - Exormothecaceae Müll.Frib. ex Grolle 1972
    - Marchantiaceae Lindl. 1836
    - Monocleaceae A.B.Frank 1877
    - Monosoleniaceae Inoue 1966
    - Oxymitraceae Müll.Frib. ex Grolle 1972
    - Ricciaceae Rchb. 1828
    - Targioniaceae Dumort. 1829
    - Wiesnerellaceae Inoue 1976
  - Neohodgsoniales D.G.Long 2006
    - Neohodgsoniaceae D.G.Long 2006
  - Sphaerocarpales Cavers 1910 (bottle liverworts)
    - Monocarpaceae D.J.Carr ex Schelpe 1969
    - Riellaceae Engl. 1892
    - Sphaerocarpaceae Heeg 1891

== Phylogeny ==
Villarreal et al. 2015

- - Blasiidae
    - Blasiales
      Blasiaceae
  - Marchantiidae
    - - Neohodgsoniales
        Neohodgsoniaceae
    - - - Sphaerocarpales
          - Riellaceae
          - - Monocarpaceae
            - Sphaerocarpaceae
      - - Lunulariales
          Lunulariaceae
        - Marchantiales
          - Marchantiaceae
          - - Dumortieraceae
            - - Aytoniaceae
              - - Cleveaceae
                - - - - Targioniaceae
                      - Wiesnerellaceae
                    - - Monosoleniaceae
                      - - Cyathodiaceae
                        - Corsiniaceae
                  - - - Monocleaceae
                      - Conocephalaceae
                    - - Oxymitraceae
                      - Ricciaceae

Xiang et al. 2022

- - Blasiidae
    - Blasiales
      Blasiaceae
  - Marchantiidae
    - - Neohodgsoniales
        Neohodgsoniaceae
    - - - Sphaerocarpales
          - Riellaceae
          - - Monocarpaceae
            - Sphaerocarpaceae
      - - Lunulariales
          Lunulariaceae
        - Marchantiales
          - Marchantiaceae
          - - Aytoniaceae
            - - Dumortieraceae
              - - - - Monosoleniaceae
                    - - Targioniaceae
                      - Wiesnerellaceae
                  - - Cleveaceae
                    - - Cyathodiaceae
                      - Corsiniaceae
                - - - Monocleaceae
                    - Conocephalaceae
                  - Ricciaceae incl. Oxymitraceae

== See also ==
- Marchantiophyta
