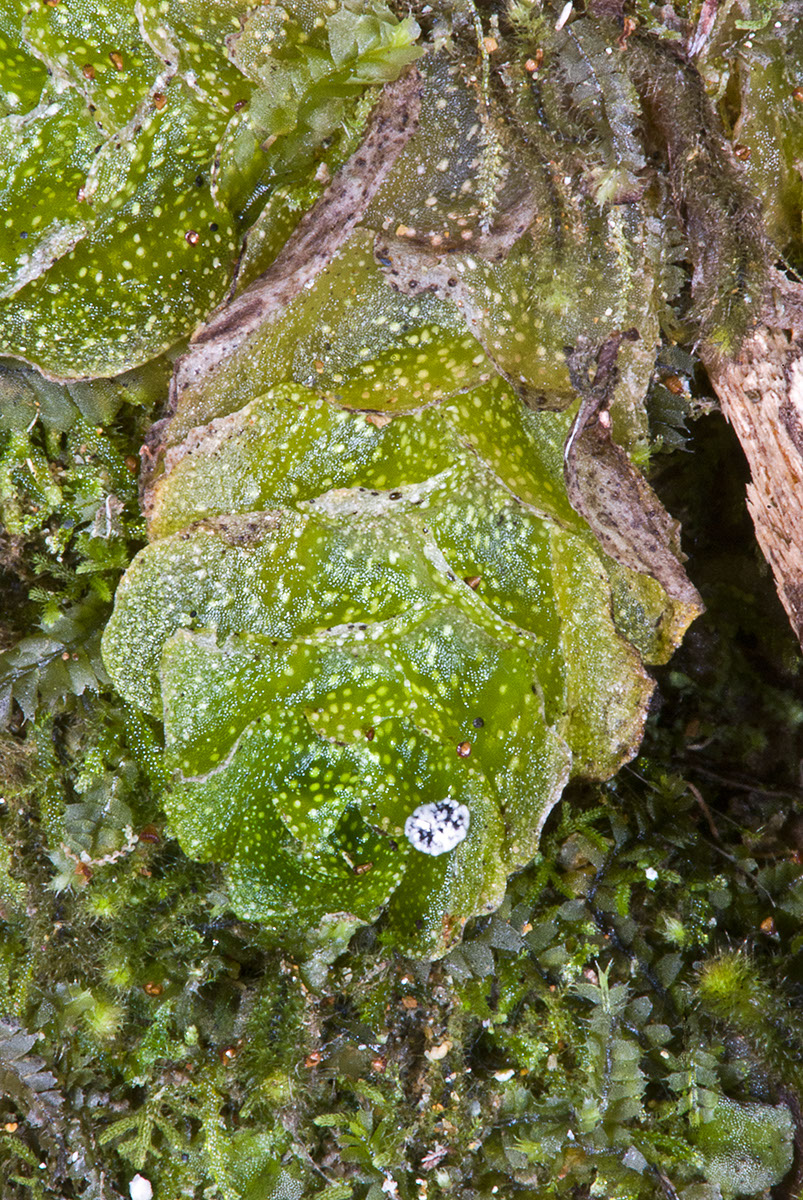

Scientific classification
- Kingdom: Plantae
- Division: Marchantiophyta
- Class: Haplomitriopsida
- Order: Treubiales
- Family: Treubiaceae
- Genus: Treubia
- Species: T. lacunosa

Binomial name
- Treubia lacunosa (Colenso) Prosk.

= Treubia lacunosa =

Species of liverwort

Treubia lacunosa is a species of liverwort in the family Treubiaceae that is found across New Zealand in moist shady areas on logs or soil. The organism is relatively complex for a liverwort, and hosts endosymbiotic fungi which provide it with growth-inhibiting nutrients.

== Description ==
Treubia lacunosa grows flat along the ground with a single fleshy but brittle axis. Two rows of lobes extend laterally outwards from this axis, and there are small upright lobules at the base of each. The entire liverwort is around 1.5 cm wide and 4–9 cm long. There are mucus-covered hairs around the rhizoids and sex organs. The sporophyte rises from around the apex of the lobe, and has a very large seta and relatively small foot.

== Taxonomy ==
The diversity of Treubia lacunosa may actually consist of two species, since there are two separate populations of the species in New Zealand. One grows primarily in sheltered forest areas, while the other is found in more open and exposed habitats. Molecular sequencing confirmed that there is a greater divergence between these populations than between other unrelated species, such as T. tasmanica and T. scapanioides. The new species would have the proposed name of Treubia lacunosoides.
