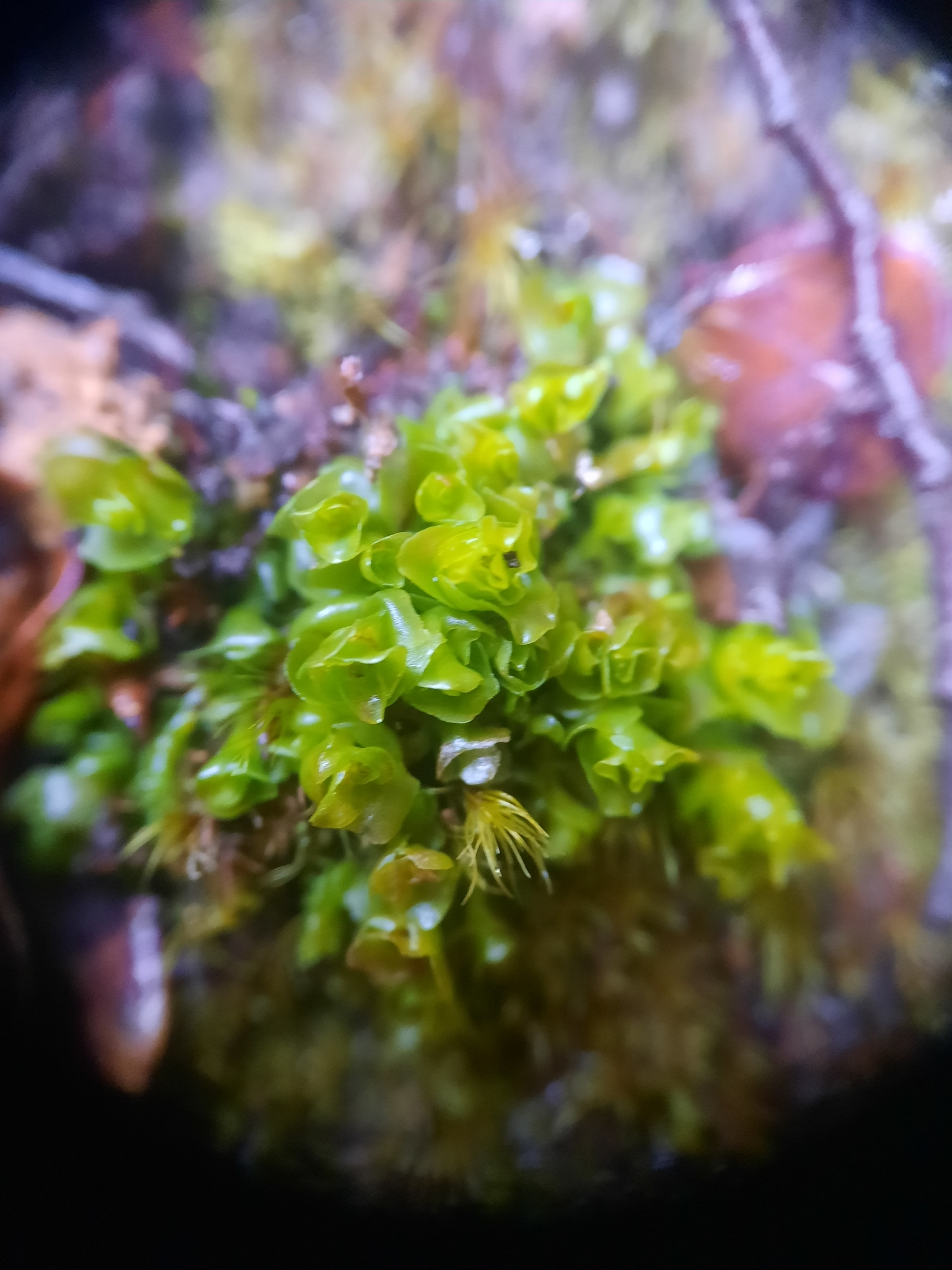
- Haplomitrium gibbsiae

Scientific classification
- Kingdom: Plantae
- Division: Marchantiophyta
- Class: Haplomitriopsida
- Order: Calobryales
- Family: Haplomitriaceae
- Genus: Haplomitrium
- Subgenus: Haplomitrium subg. Haplomitrium
- Section: Haplomitrium sect. Archibryum
- Species: H. gibbsiae

Binomial name
- Haplomitrium gibbsiae (Steph.) R.M.Schust.

Synonyms
- Calobryum gibbsiae Steph.; Calobryum dentatum D.Kumar & Udar; Calobryum indicum Udar & V.Chandra; Haplomitrium chilense R.M.Schust.; Haplomitrium dentatum (D.Kumar & Udar) J.J.Engel; Haplomitrium grollei D.Kumar & Udar; Haplomitrium indicum (Udar & V.Chandra) R.M.Schust.; Haplomitrium kashyapii Udar & D.Kumar

= Haplomitrium gibbsiae =

Species of liverwort

Haplomitrium gibbsiae is a species of liverwort.

The specific Latin epithet of gibbsiae is in honour of Lilian Gibbs (1870–1925), a British botanist.
