= Haplomitrium blumei =

Scientific classification
- Kingdom: Plantae
- Division: Marchantiophyta
- Class: Haplomitriopsida
- Order: Calobryales
- Family: Haplomitriaceae
- Genus: Haplomitrium
- Subgenus: Haplomitrium subg. Calobryum
- Species: H. blumei

Binomial name
- Haplomitrium blumei (Nees) R.M.Schust.

Synonyms
- Monoclea blumei Nees; Calobryum blumii (Nees) Nees; Scalius andinus Spruce; Scalius carnosulus Mitt.; Calobryum andinum (Spruce) Steph.; Tylimanthus giganteus Steph.; Thysananthus integerrimus Steph.; Calobryum giganteum (Steph.) Grolle; Haplomitrium andinum(Spruce) R.M. Schust.; Haplomitrium giganteum (Steph.) Grolle

Species of liverwort

Haplomitrium blumei is a species of liverwort.
