= Haplomitrium mnioides =

Scientific classification
- Kingdom: Plantae
- Division: Marchantiophyta
- Class: Haplomitriopsida
- Order: Calobryales
- Family: Haplomitriaceae
- Genus: Haplomitrium
- Subgenus: Haplomitrium subg. Calobryum
- Species: H. mnioides

Binomial name
- Haplomitrium mnioides (Lindb.) R.M. Schust.

Synonyms
- Calobryum mnioides (Lindb.) Steph.; Rhopalanthus mnioides Lindb.; Scalius rotundifolius Mitt.; Calobryum rotundifolium Mitt.; Haplomitrium rotundifolium Mitt.

Species of liverwort

Haplomitrium mnioides is a species of liverwort from China, Taiwan, and Japan.
