= Haplomitrium hookeri var. minutum =

Scientific classification
- Kingdom: Plantae
- Division: Marchantiophyta
- Class: Haplomitriopsida
- Order: Calobryales
- Family: Haplomitriaceae
- Genus: Haplomitrium
- Species: H. hookeri
- Variety: H. h. var. minutum

Trinomial name
- Haplomitrium hookeri var. minutum (E. O. Campb.) Barthol.-Began

Synonyms
- Haplomitrium minutum (E.O.Campb.) J.J.Engel & R.M.Schust.; Steereomitrium minutum E.O.Campb.

Species of liverwort

Haplomitrium minutum is a liverwort from New Zealand.
