= Treubia scapanioides =

Scientific classification
- Kingdom: Plantae
- Division: Marchantiophyta
- Class: Haplomitriopsida
- Order: Treubiales
- Family: Treubiaceae
- Genus: Treubia
- Species: T. scapanioides

Binomial name
- Treubia scapanioides R.M. Schust.

Species of liverwort

Treubia scapanioides is a species of liverwort in the family Treubiaceae. Until recently, the genus was placed in the order Metzgeriales. There are only 6 species in the genus Treubia. Five are native to Australasia but T. scapanioides is known only from Chile.
