= Gibbsia =

Gibbsia is the scientific name of two genera of organisms and may refer to:

- Gibbsia (alveolate), a genus of apicomplexans in the family Adeleidae
- Gibbsia (plant), a genus of plants in the family Urticaceae
