= Haplomitrium hookeri =

Scientific classification
- Kingdom: Plantae
- Division: Marchantiophyta
- Class: Haplomitriopsida
- Order: Calobryales
- Family: Haplomitriaceae
- Genus: Haplomitrium
- Subgenus: Haplomitrium subg. Haplomitrium
- Section: Haplomitrium sect. Haplomitrium
- Species: H. hookeri

Binomial name
- Haplomitrium hookeri (Sm.) Nees

Varieties
- Haplomitrium hookeri var. hookeri; Haplomitrium hookeri var. minutum (E.O. Campb.) Barthol.-Began

Synonyms
- Jungermannia hookeri Sm. Gymnomitrion hookeri (Sm.) Corda; Scalius hookeri (Sm.) Gray

Species of liverwort

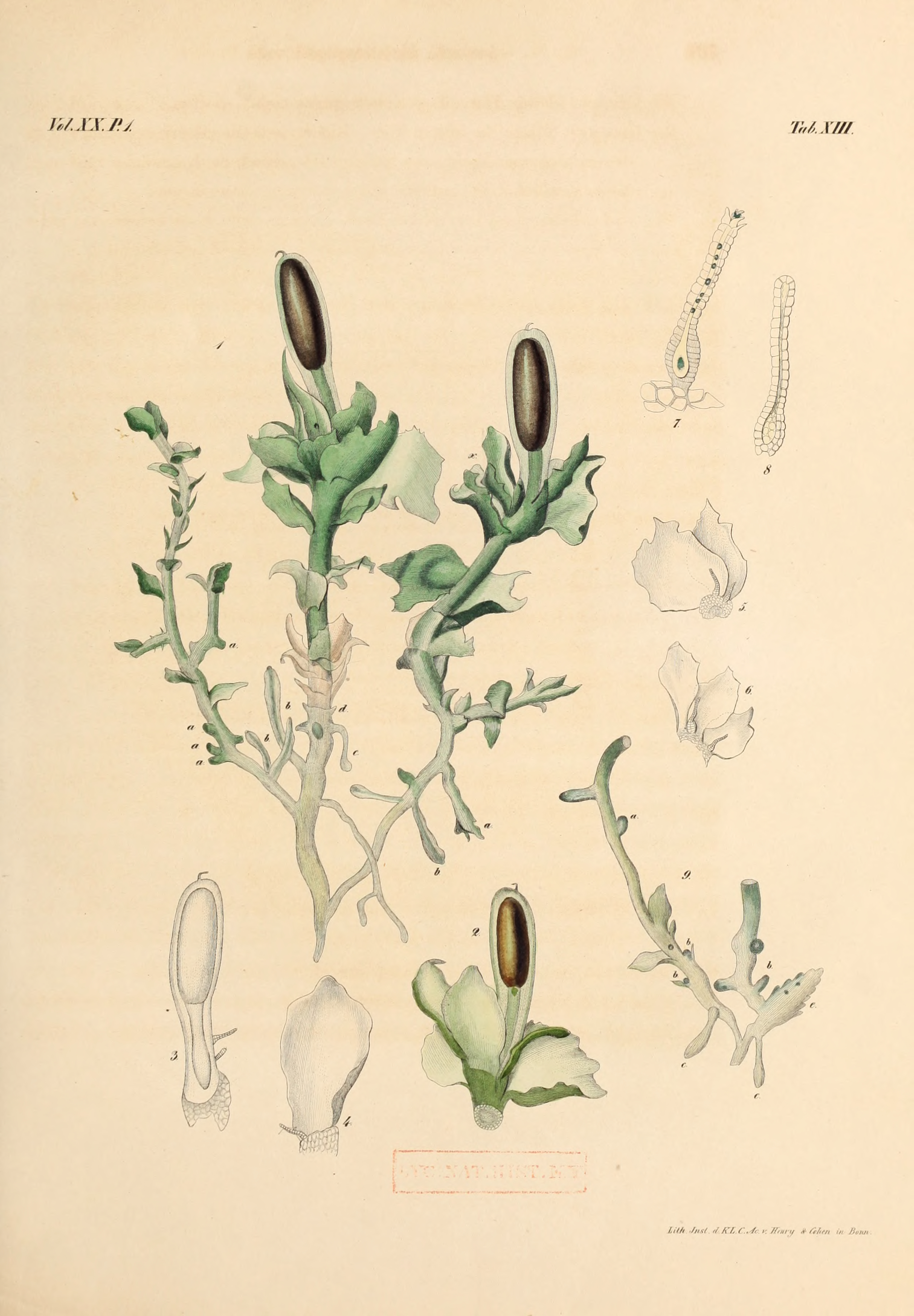
Scientific illustration of Haplomitrium hookeri

Haplomitrium hookeri, or Hooker's flapwort, is a species of liverwort. It occurs in Europe, Asia, North America and New Zealand.
