= Gessella =

Gessella Temporal range: Early Permian

Scientific classification
- Kingdom: Plantae
- Division: Marchantiophyta
- Class: Haplomitriopsida
- Order: Calobryales
- Family: Haplomitriaceae
- Genus: †Gessella; C.Poulsen

Type species
- Gessella communis C.Poulsen

Species
- †Gessella communis C.Poulsen; †Gessella striata C.Poulsen

Extinct genus of liverworts

Gessella is a fossil genus of liverworts in the family Haplomitriaceae. Fossils were found in Early Permian deposits of Western Zealand.
