= Lilian Gibbs =

British botanist, botanical collector and scientific illustrator (1870-1925)

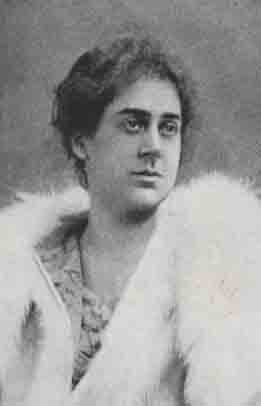
- Born: 10 September 1870; London, United Kingdom
- Died: 30 January 1925 (aged 54); Santa Cruz de Tenerife
- Known for: Mount Kinabalu
- Awards: Fellow of the Linnean Society, 1905; Huxley Medal and Prize, 1910
- Scientific career
- Fields: Botany
- Workplaces: British Museum
- Author abbrev. (botany): Gibbs

Lilian Suzette Gibbs (1870–1925) was a British botanist who worked for the British Museum in London and was an authority on mountain ecosystems. The standard author abbreviation Gibbs is used to indicate this person as the author when citing a botanical name.

== Education ==
She studied initially at Swanley Horticultural College in Kent, UK (1899-1901) and then specialised in botany at the Royal College of Science in London, studying under J. B. Farmer. Her postgraduate research was into seeds of the Alsinoideae (Caryophyllaceae). While a student, she collected plants from the European Alps and developed her identification skills with help from the Botanical Department at the Natural History Museum.

== Career ==
Gibbs was employed by the Natural History section of the British Museum in London for her entire career but also collaborated with the Herbarium at the Royal Botanic Gardens, Kew and undertook histological and plant development work at the Royal College of Science. Expeditions between 1905 and 1915 to Australia, New Zealand, Fiji, Iceland, Indonesia, Malaysia, South America, the US and Zimbabwe allowed her to see plant life worldwide, and mountain plants were her particular interest. In 1905, she was part of a British Association visit to Rhodesia (Zimbabwe) and also collected plant material. She visited Fiji in 1907, and explored the flora on the northern slopes of the Mount Victoria range, and then studied the bryophyte flora of New Zealand on her way home, identifying four new species of liverwort in the Waitākere Ranges. She also reported on the destruction of the New Zealand forests to permit grazing on her return to the UK in the Gardener's Chronicle in 1908 and 1909.

She was the first woman and the first botanist to ascend Mount Kinabalu in February 1910 while leading an expedition for three months that recorded 15 new plant species. One outcome of this expedition was to show the importance of New Guinea as a centre for subsequent radiation of plants to south and east. In 1912, she collected in Iceland. 1913 found her in the Arfak Mountains in Dutch New Guinea and she continued to the Bellenden Ker Range in Queensland, Australia in 1914 and then returned to London from Tasmania in 1915. Her final journey was to South America. Her travels were limited after 1921 due to ill-health and she died on 30 January 1925 at Santa Cruz, on Tenerife in the Canary Islands.

Gibbs collected many plants new to science. Her specimens are in the collections at the British Museum. Others have named genera and species in her honour. These include the genus Gibbsia Rendle, Garcinia gibbsiae S.Moore, Racemobambos gibbsiae (Stapf) Holttum or Miss Gibbs' Bamboo, (Urticaceae), and the liverwort species Haplomitrium gibbsiae (Steph.) R.M.Schust. and Neolepidozia gibbsiana (Steph.) E.D.Cooper

Gibbs had the personality and ability to organise and carry out her expeditions successfully but was also remembered for her skill as a hostess at afternoon tea-parties.

== Awards ==
Gibbs was elected a Fellow of the Linnean Society in 1905. In 1910 she was awarded the Huxley medal and prize for research in natural science and also joined the Microscopial Society. She became a Fellow of the Royal Geographical Society in 1919.

== Publications ==
Her publications include:

- (1904) Notes on Floral Anomalies in species of Cerastium New Phytologist 3 243-247
- (1906) A contribution to the botany of Southern Rhodesia. Botanical J. Linnean Society 38 425-494
- (1907) Notes on the development and structure of the seed in the Alsinoideae. Annals of Botany 21 25-55
- (1908) Bio-histological notes on some new Rhodesian species of Fuirena, Hesperantha and Justicia Annals of Botany 22 187-206
- (1909) A contribution to the montane flora of Fiji (including crypograms). Botanical J. Linnean Society 39 130-212
- (1911) The Hepatics of New Zealand. Journal of Botany 49 261-266
- (1912) On the development of the female strobilus in Podocarpus. Annals of Botany 24 515-571
- (1914) A contribution to the flora and plant formations of Mount Kinabalu and the Highlands of British North Borneo. Botanical J. Linnean Society 42 1-240
- (1917) Dutch N. W. New Guinea: a contribution to the phytogeography and flora of the Arfak Mountains, etc. Octavo Taylor and Francis, London
- (1917) A contribution to the phyto-geography of Bellenden-Ker. Journal of Botany 55 297-310
- (1920) Notes on the phyto-geography and flora of the mountain summit plateaux of Tasmania. J Ecology 8 1-17
- (1920) The genus Calobryum. Journal of Botany 58 275
