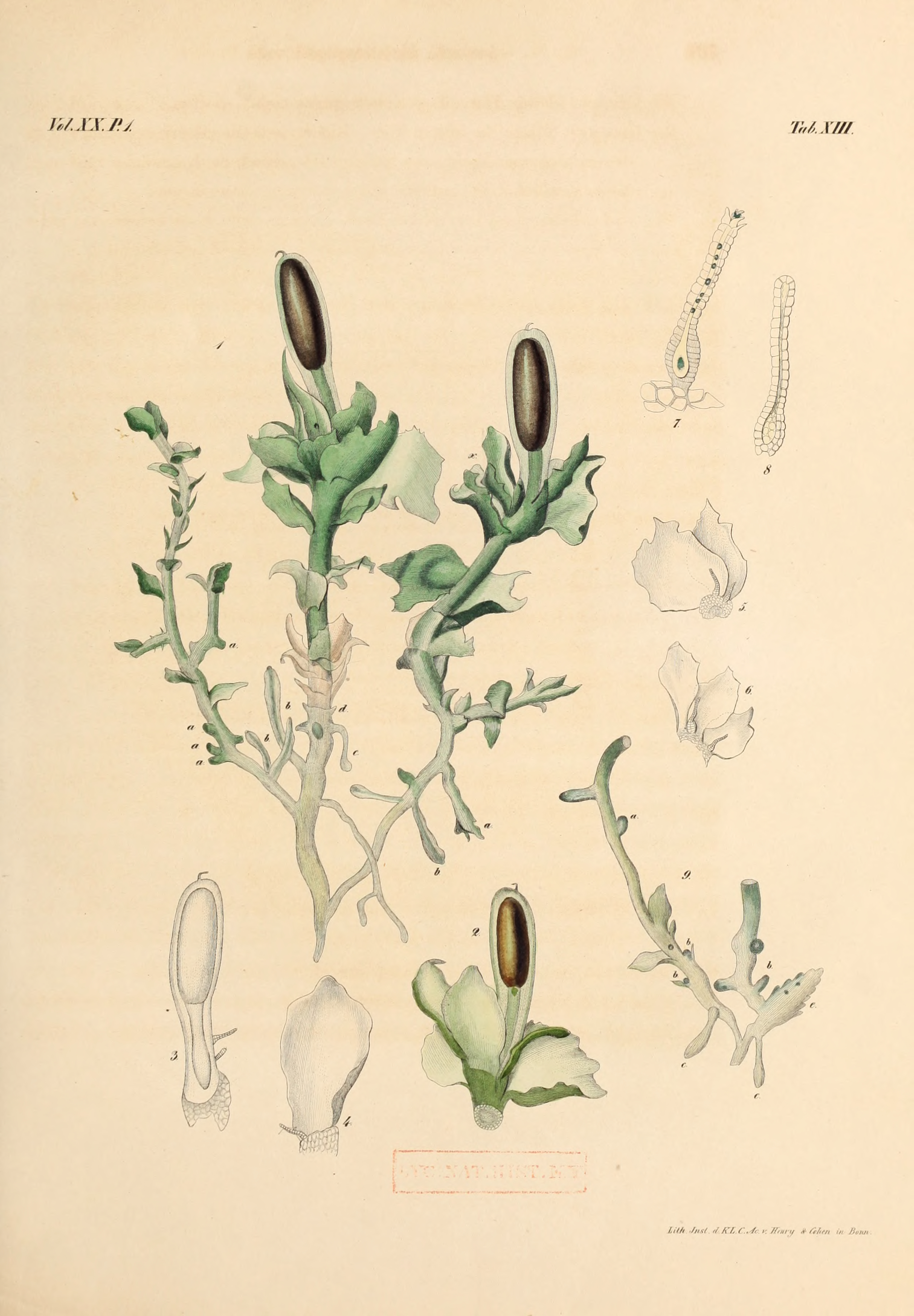
- Haplomitrium hookeri

Scientific classification
- Kingdom: Plantae
- Division: Marchantiophyta
- Class: Haplomitriopsida
- Order: Calobryales
- Family: Haplomitriaceae
- Genus: Haplomitrium; Nees 1833 nom. cons.

Type species
- Haplomitrium hookeri Nees, 1833

Synonyms
- Calobryum Nees 1846; Cladobryum Nees ex Endlicher 1840; Mniopsis Dumortier 1822 non Wilson 1859 non Martius 1823; Rhopalanthus Lindberg 1874; Scalius Gray 1821 suppressed name; Scaliusa Kuntze 1891; Steereomitrium Campbell 1987

= Haplomitrium =

Genus of liverworts

Haplomitrium is a genus of liverworts.

== Species ==
Species of Haplomitrium:

- Subgenus (Calobryum) (Nees 1846) Schuster 1967c [Calobryum Nees 1846; Cladobryum Nees ex Endlicher 1840]
  - Haplomitrium blumei (Nees 1846) Schuster 1963
  - Haplomitrium mnioides (Lindberg 1875) Schuster 1963
- Subgenus (Haplomitrium) Nees 1833 nom. cons.
  - Section Archibryum (Schuster 1967c) Engel 1981
    - Haplomitrium gibbsiae (Steph. 1917) Schuster 1963
    - Haplomitrium intermedium Berrie 1962
  - Section Haplomitrium Nees 1833 nom. cons.
    - Haplomitrium hookeri (Lyell ex Sm. 1814) Nees 1833
      - Haplomitrium hookeri var. minutum (Campbell 1987) Bartholomew-Began 1991
    - Haplomitrium monoicum Engel 1981
    - Haplomitrium ovalifolium Schuster 1971d
