= Apotreubia =

Scientific classification
- Kingdom: Plantae
- Division: Marchantiophyta
- Class: Haplomitriopsida
- Order: Treubiales
- Family: Treubiaceae
- Genus: Apotreubia; S.Hatt & Mizut.

Species
- Apotreubia nana (S.Hatt. & Inoue) S.Hatt. & Mizut.; Apotreubia pusilla (R.M.Schust.) Grolle

Genus of liverworts

Apotreubia is a genus of liverworts in the family Treubiaceae. There are two species, Apotreubia nana, which is found in subalpine New Guinea, and Apotreubia pusilla, which has a disjunct distribution between eastern Asia (Himalayas to Japan) and British Columbia.

The genus name of Apotreubia is in honour of Melchior Treub (1851–1910), who was a Dutch botanist. He worked at the Bogor Botanical Gardens in Buitenzorg on the island of Java, south of Batavia, Dutch East Indies, gaining renown for his work on tropical flora.
