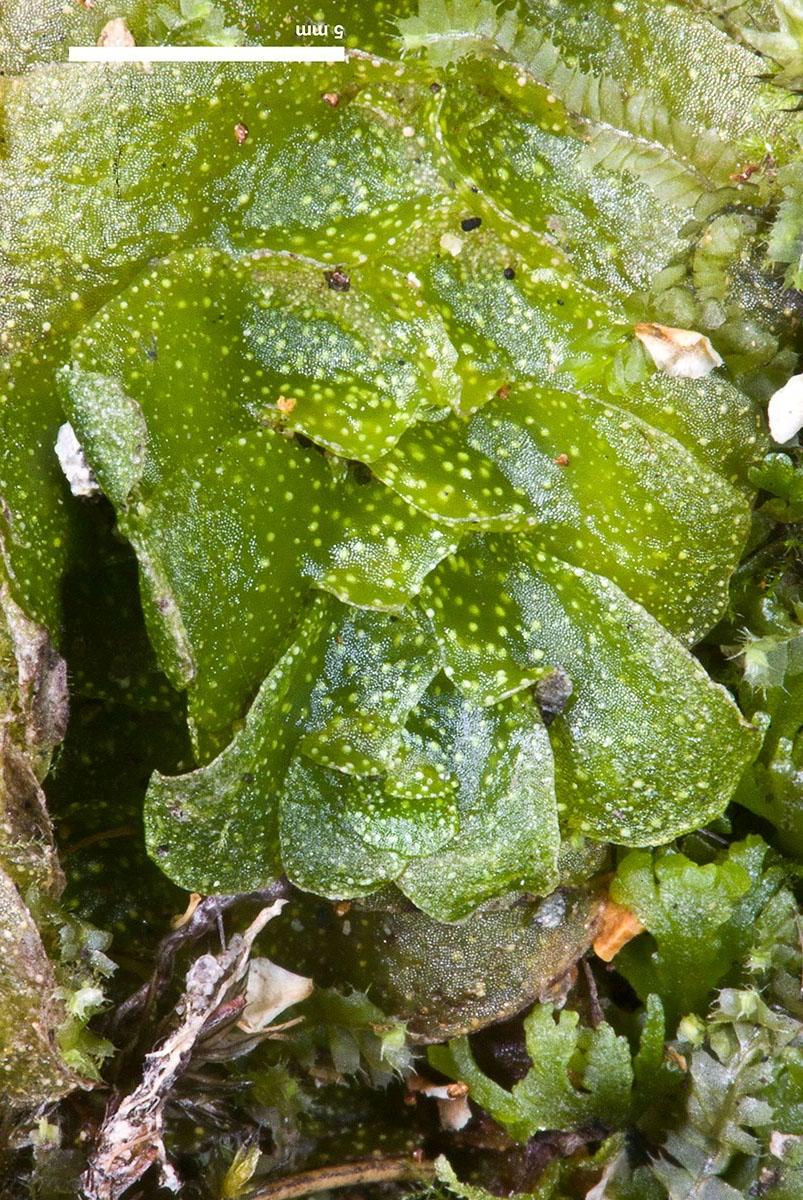
- Treubia lacunosa

Scientific classification
- Kingdom: Plantae
- Division: Marchantiophyta
- Class: Haplomitriopsida
- Order: Treubiales
- Family: Treubiaceae
- Genus: Treubia; K.I.Goebel 1890 nom. cons. non Pierre 1890

Species
- Treubia insignis; Treubia lacunosa; Treubia lacunosoides; Treubia pygmaea; Treubia scapanioides; Treubia tahitensis; Treubia tasmanica

= Treubia =

Genus of liverworts

Treubia is a genus of liverworts in the family Treubiaceae. There are seven species, all of which are restricted to the southern hemisphere. Five of the species occur in Australasia and the other (Treubia scapanioides) occurs in Chile. All species are dioicous, with separate male and female gametophytes.

== Classification ==
Species list:

- Treubia insignis K.I.Goebel
- Treubia lacunosa (Colenso) Prosk.
- Treubia lacunosoides T.Pfeiff., W.Frey et M.Stech
- Treubia pygmaea R.M.Schust.
- Treubia scapanioides R.M.Schust.
- Treubia tahitensis (Nadeaud) Goebel ex Besch.
- Treubia tasmanica R.M.Schust. et G.A.M.Scott
