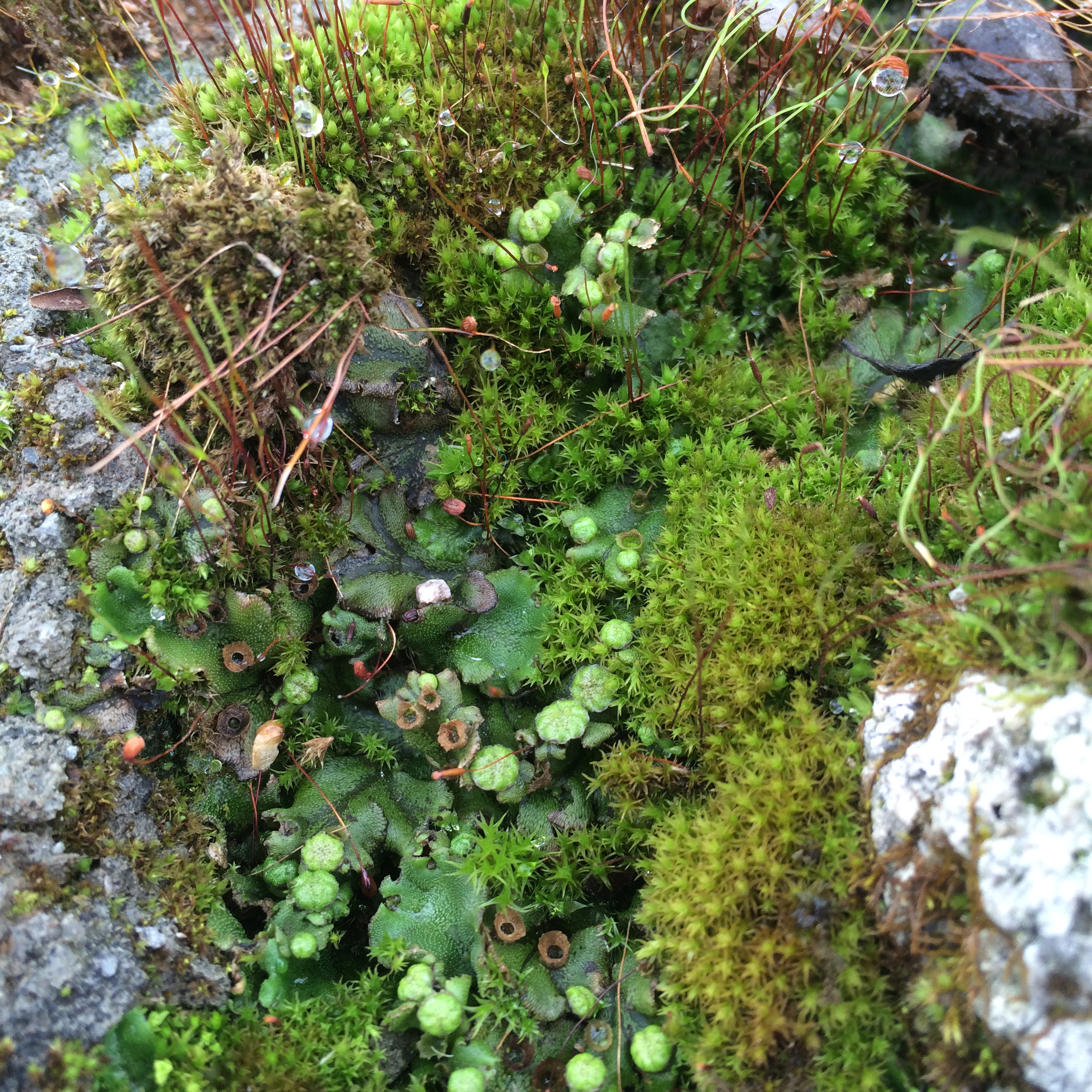
- A mosaic of liverworts and mosses

Scientific classification
- Kingdom: Plantae
- Clade: Embryophytes
- Clade: Setaphyta

Divisions
- Marchantiophytina – liverworts; Bryophytina – mosses

= Setaphyta =

Subclade of green plants, also known as land plants

The Setaphyta are a clade within the division Bryophyta sensu lato which includes Marchantiophytina (liverworts) and Bryophytina (mosses). Excluded are the Anthocerotophytina (hornworts). A 2018 study found through molecular sequencing that liverworts are more closely related to mosses than hornworts, with the implication that liverworts were not among the first species to colonize land.

== Phylogeny ==
There is strong phylogenetic evidence for Setaphyta.

'Monophyletic bryophytes' model
'Liverworts plus mosses–basal' model

- embryophytes
  - vascular plants
  - bryophytes
    - hornworts
    - setaphytes
      - mosses
      - liverworts

- embryophytes
  - - vascular plants
    - hornworts
  - setaphytes
    - mosses
    - liverworts

Two of the most likely models for bryophyte evolution.
