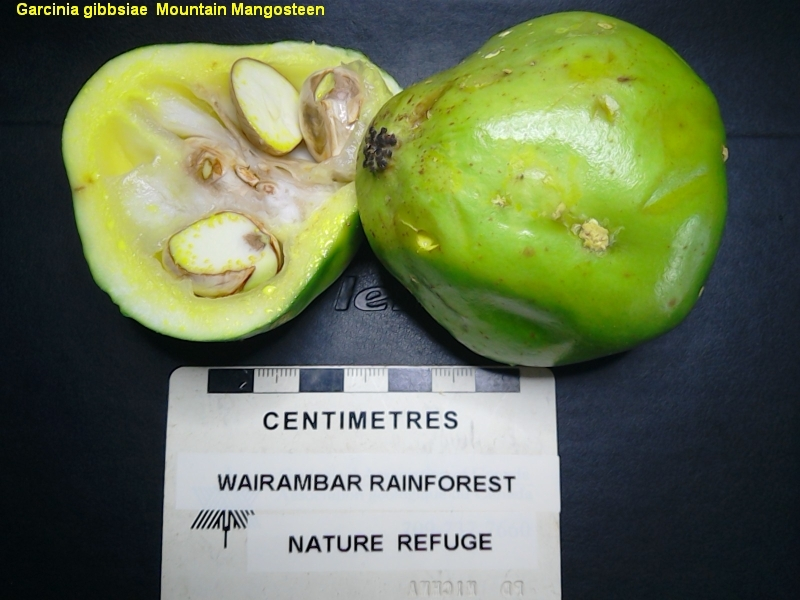
- Fruit

Conservation status
- Least Concern (IUCN 3.1)

Scientific classification
- Kingdom: Plantae
- Clade: Tracheophytes
- Clade: Angiosperms
- Clade: Eudicots
- Clade: Rosids
- Order: Malpighiales
- Family: Clusiaceae
- Genus: Garcinia
- Species: G. gibbsiae

Binomial name
- Garcinia gibbsiae S.Moore

= Garcinia gibbsiae =

Mountain mangosteen

Species of flowering plant

Garcinia gibbsiae, commonly known as mountain mangosteen, is a species of plants in the family Clusiaceae found only in the Wet Tropics bioregion of Queensland, Australia. It is a small tree to about 15 m (49 ft) tall. Leaves can reach 20 cm (7.9 in) long and 9 cm (3.5 in) wide, and they have numerous lateral veins either side of the midrib. This species is dioecious, meaning that pistillate (functionally female) and staminate (functionally male) flowers are borne on separate plants. It was first described in 1917 by English botanist Spencer Le Marchant Moore, and the species epithet was given in honour of another English botanist, Lilian Gibbs, who collected the type specimen.

== Conservation ==
This species has been assessed to be of least concern by the International Union for Conservation of Nature (IUCN) and by the Queensland Government under its Nature Conservation Act.
