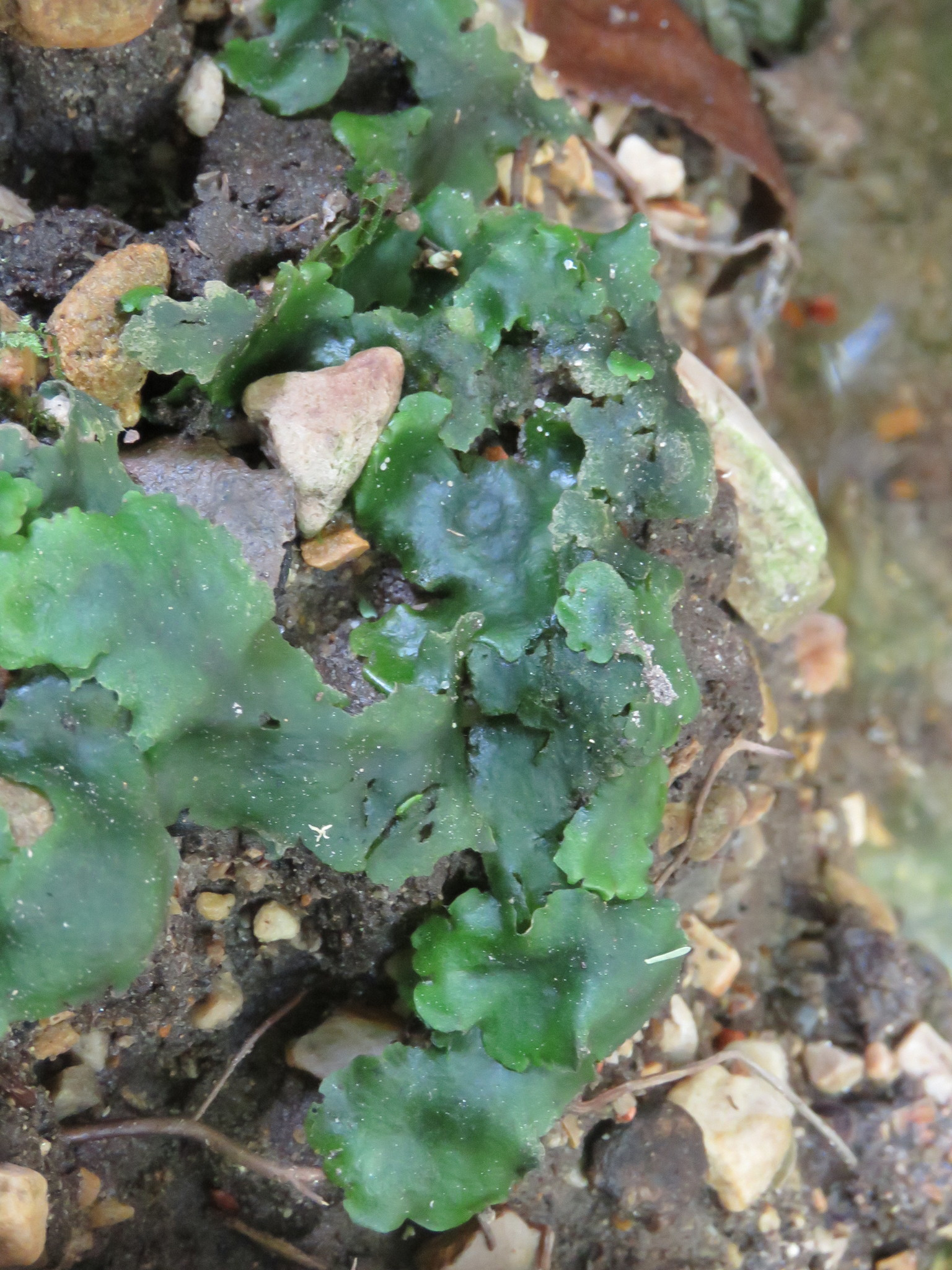

Scientific classification
- Kingdom: Plantae
- Division: Marchantiophyta
- Class: Marchantiopsida
- Order: Marchantiales
- Family: Monocleaceae
- Genus: Monoclea
- Species: M. gottschei

Binomial name
- Monoclea gottschei Lindb., 1886

= Monoclea gottschei =

Species of liverwort

Monoclea gottschei is a species of liverwort belonging to the family Monocleaceae.

A study in tropical Ecuador found that Monoclea gottschei was typically not found in urban environments despite being found in a nearby more pristine location, suggesting that the species is sensitive to anthropogenic effects such as the presence of wastewater and heavy metal pollution.
