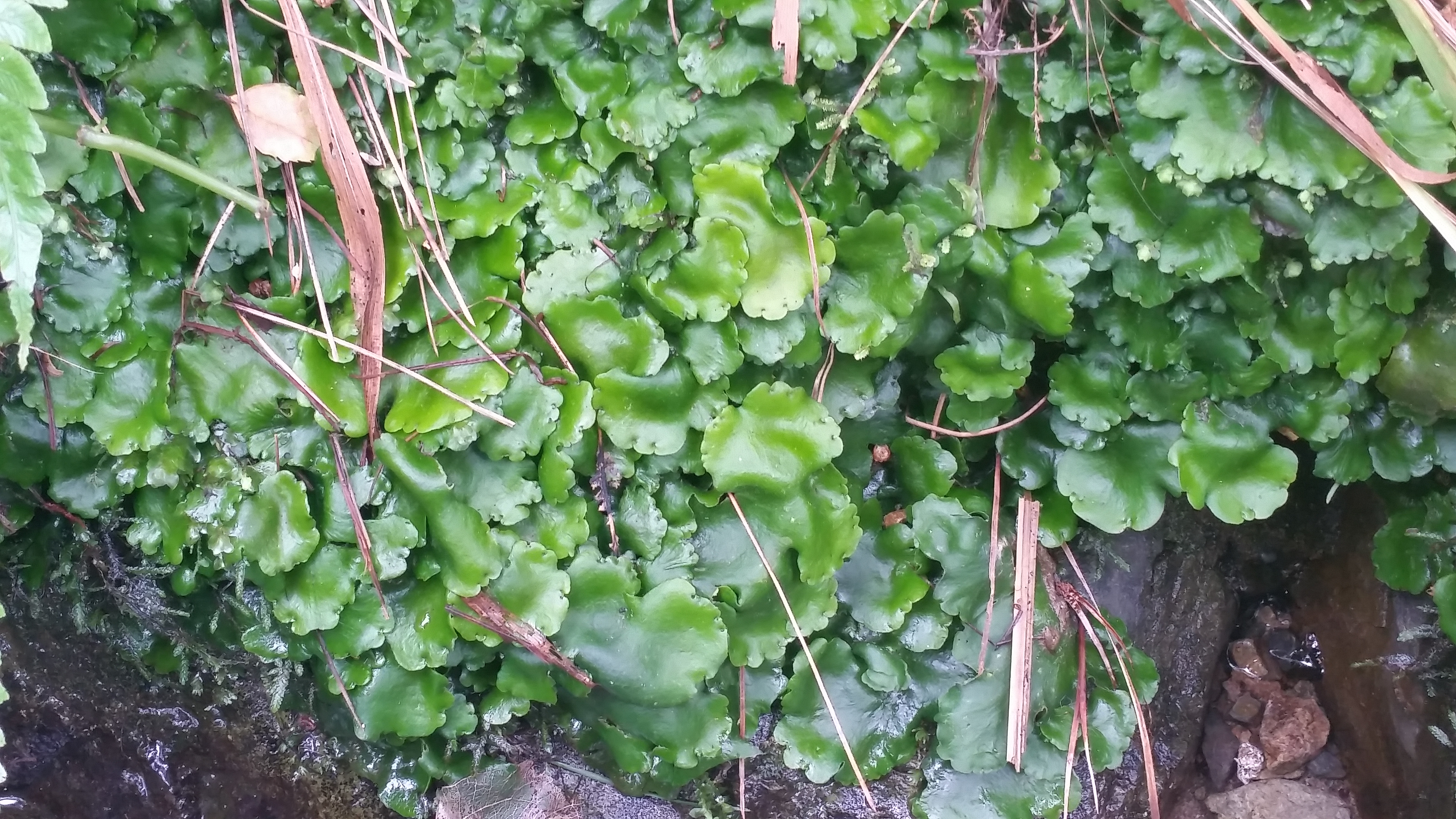
- Monoclea forsteri

Scientific classification
- Kingdom: Plantae
- Division: Marchantiophyta
- Class: Marchantiopsida
- Order: Marchantiales
- Family: Monocleaceae; A.B.Frank
- Genus: Monoclea; Hook.

Species
- Monoclea forsteri Monoclea gottschei

= Monoclea =

Genus of liverworts

Monoclea is a genus of liverwort that contains two species. It is the only genus in the family Monocleaceae. Species of this genus can be found in New Zealand, South and Central America as well as in the Caribbean.

Classifications of the late twentieth century recognized a separate order, Monocleales, but later molecular studies show that it is closely related to the liverwort genus Dumortiera.

== Species in Monoclea ==
- Monoclea forsteri
- Monoclea gottschei
