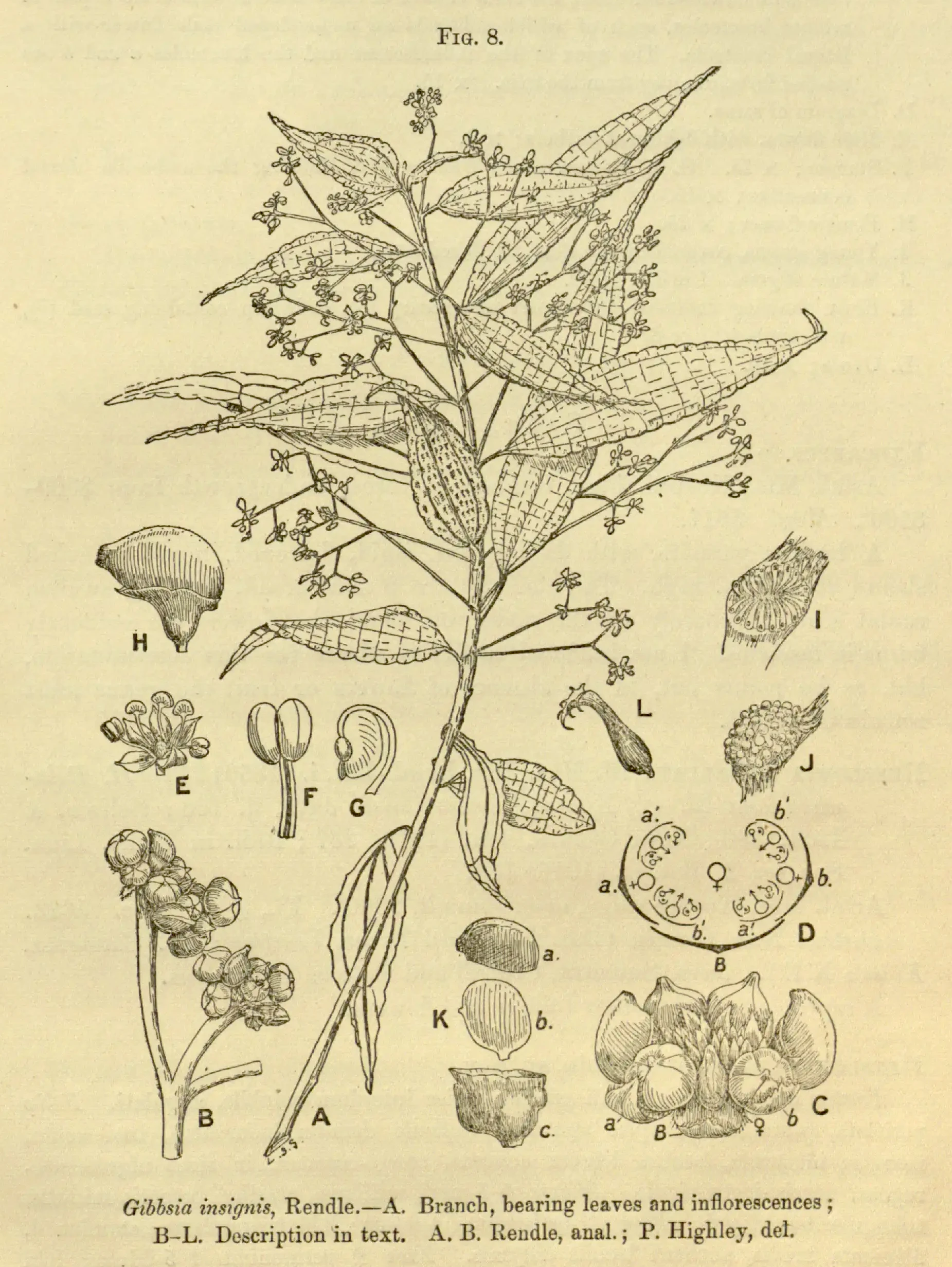
- Gibbsia insignis

Scientific classification
- Kingdom: Plantae
- Clade: Embryophytes
- Clade: Tracheophytes
- Clade: Angiosperms
- Clade: Eudicots
- Clade: Rosids
- Order: Rosales
- Family: Urticaceae
- Genus: Gibbsia; Rendle

= Gibbsia (plant) =

Genus of flowering plants

Gibbsia is a genus of flowering plants belonging to the family Urticaceae. It contains two species, both native to mountains of western New Guinea.

== Taxonomy ==
The genus was erected in 1917 by English botanist Alfred Barton Rendle, and published in the book A Contribution to the Phytogeography and Flora of the Arfak Mountains by Lilian Gibbs. Rendle named the genus after Gibbs.

Two species have been described:

- Gibbsia carstenszensis Rendle
- Gibbsia insignis Rendle

== Description ==
Plants in this genus are shrubs. The leaves are alternate with toothed margins, and they have fine white hairs covering the underside. Cystoliths (tiny mineral deposits between cells) are present on the leaf blades, appearing like pin-pricks.

The plants are monoecious, meaning that flowers are either male or female, and both types are present on each plant. They are produced together on small cymes emerging from the leaf axils. Male flowers have five petals and five stamens, female flowers have a single stigma. The fruit are drupe-like.
