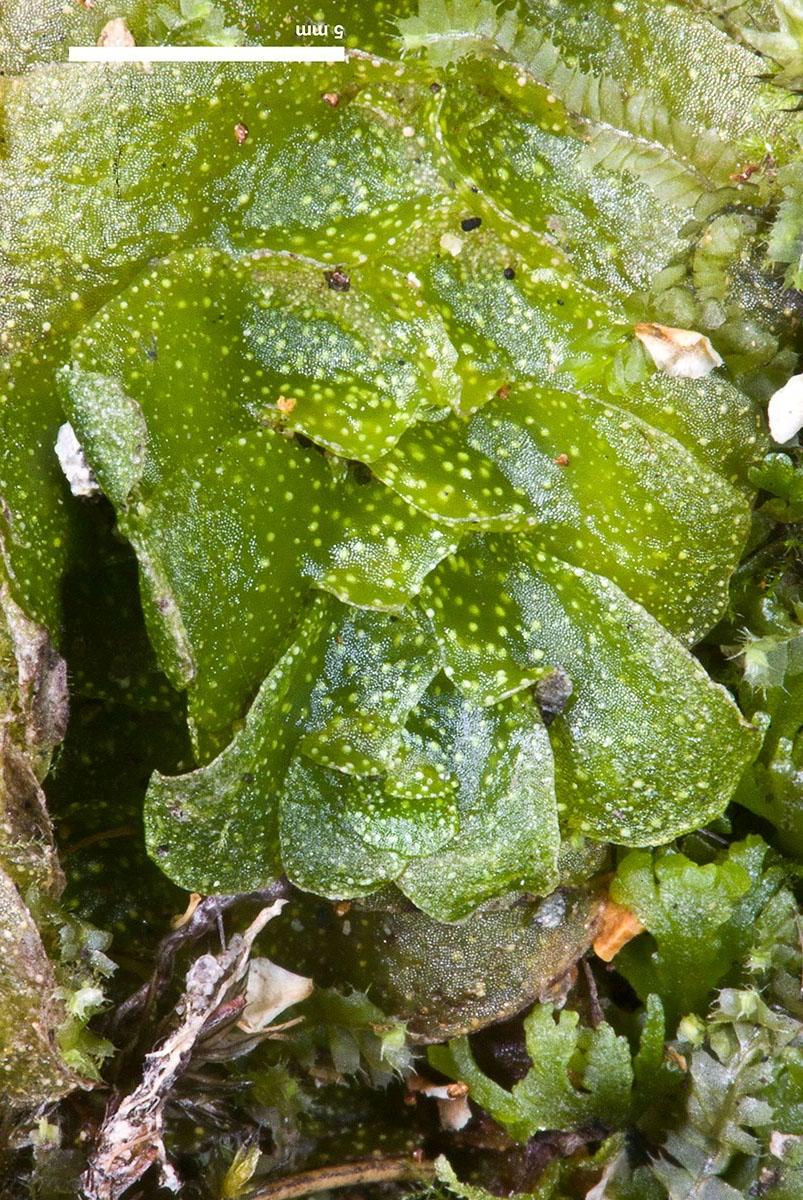
- Treubia lacunosa

Scientific classification
- Kingdom: Plantae
- Division: Marchantiophyta
- Class: Haplomitriopsida
- Subclass: Treubiidae; Stotler & Crand.-Stotl.
- Order: Treubiales; Schljakova
- Family: Treubiaceae; Verd.

Genera
- Apotreubia; Treubia

= Treubiaceae =

Family of liverworts

Treubiaceae is a family of liverworts in the order Treubiales. Species are large and leafy, and were previously classified among the Metzgeriales.
