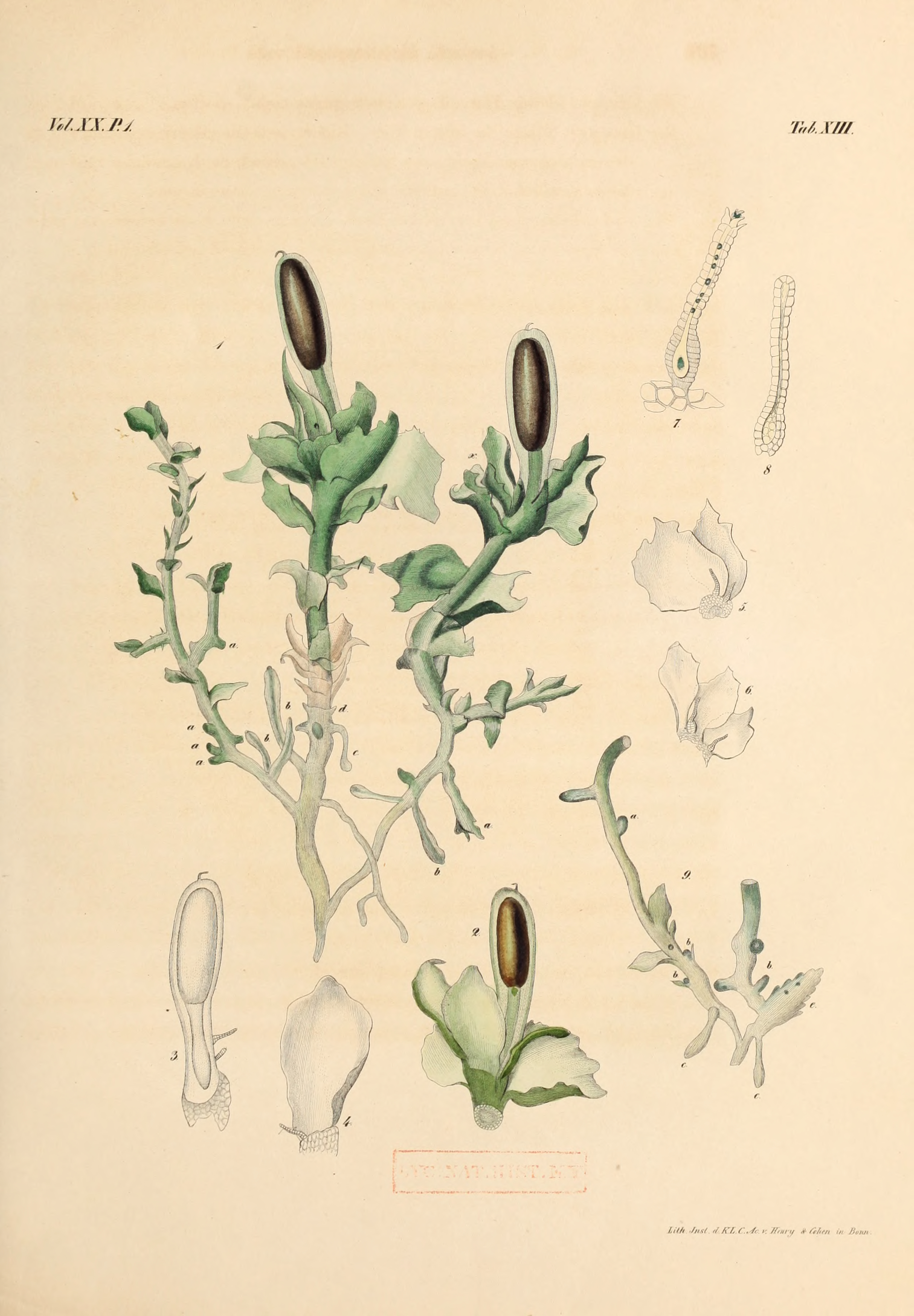
- Haplomitrium hookeri

Scientific classification
- Kingdom: Plantae
- Division: Marchantiophyta
- Class: Haplomitriopsida
- Subclass: Haplomitriidae; Stotler & Crand.-Stotl.
- Order: Calobryales; Hamlin
- Family: Haplomitriaceae; Dědeček 1884

Genera
- †Gessella Poulsen 1974; Haplomitrium Nees 1833

Synonyms
- Calobryales Campbell ex Hamlin, 1972; Calobryaceae K.I. Goebel, 1905

= Haplomitriaceae =

Haplomitriaceae Temporal range: Early Permian–Recent

Order of liverworts

Calobryales (formerly Haplomitriales) is an order of plants known as liverworts.

This order contains one family, Haplomitriaceae, with a single extant genus Haplomitrium.

== Taxonomy ==
- Order Calobryales Campbell ex Hamlin 1972 [Haplomitriales Buch ex Schljakov 1972]
  - Family Haplomitriaceae Dědeček 1884
    - Genus †Gessella Poulsen 1974
    - Genus Haplomitrium Nees 1833 nom. cons.
