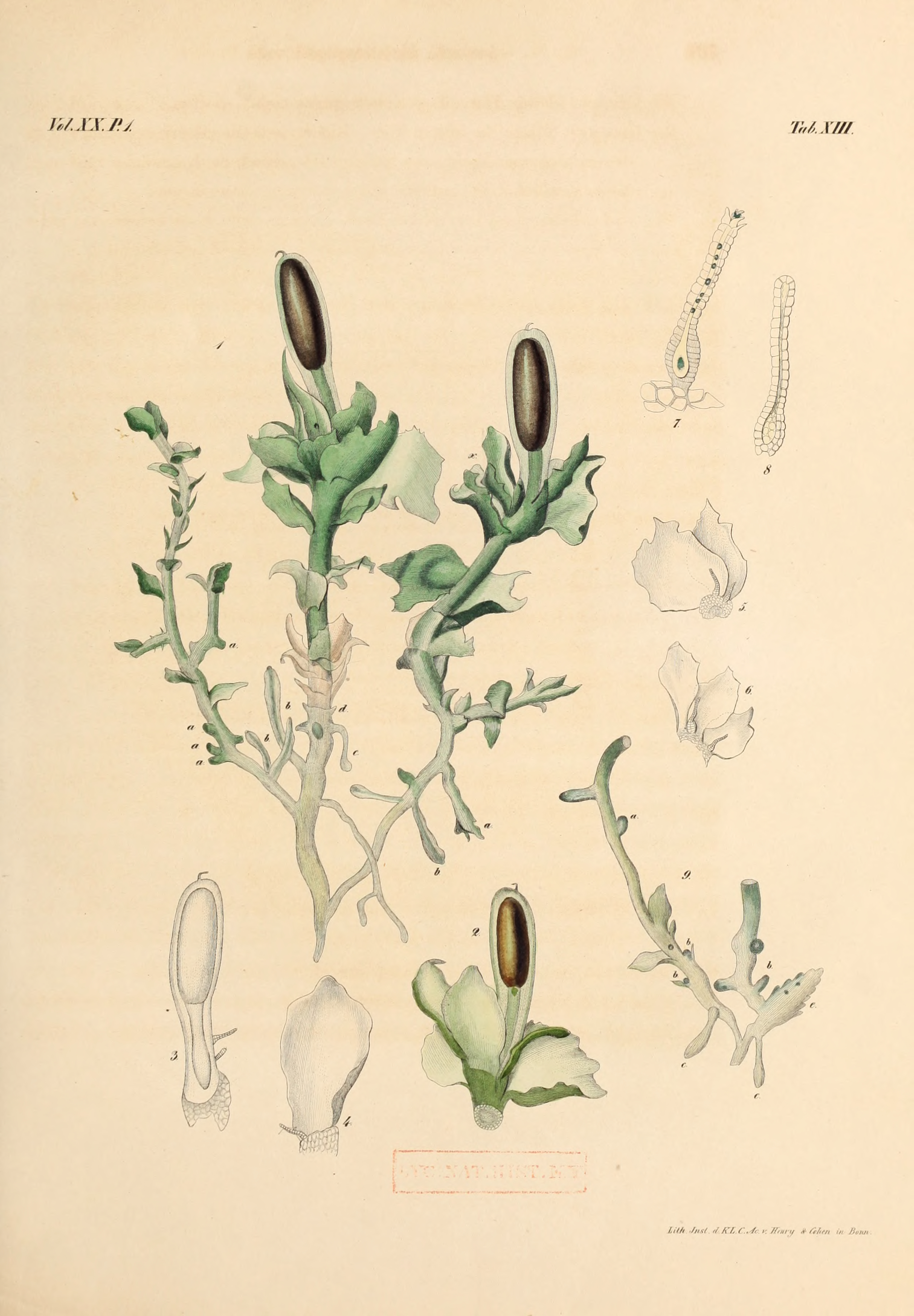
- Haplomitrium hookeri

Scientific classification
- Kingdom: Plantae
- Division: Marchantiophyta
- Class: Haplomitriopsida; Stotler & Stotl.-Crand., 1977

Type genus
- Haplomitrium Nees, 1833

Subgroups
- See text.

Synonyms
- Treubiopsida M.Stech, J.-P.Frahm, Hilger & W.Frey

= Haplomitriopsida =

Haplomitriopsida Temporal range: Early Permian–Recent

Class of liverworts

Haplomitriopsida is a class of liverworts comprising fifteen species in three genera. Recent cladistic analyses of nuclear, mitochondrial, and plastid gene sequences place this monophyletic group as the basal sister group to all other liverworts. The group thus provides a unique insight into the early evolution of liverworts in particular and of land plants in general.

== Description ==
Plants of Treubia grow as a prostrate leafy thallus. The bifid leaves extend like wings on either side of the midrib, or may be folded upwards and pressed close together, giving the plants a ruffled appearance. By contrast, Haplomitrium grows as a subterranean rhizome with erect leafy stems. The thin, rounded leaves are arranged around the upright stems, giving the appearance of a soft moss. The species Haplomitrium ovalifolium of Australia often has bifid leaves that are asymmetrical, somewhat like those in Treubia.

Haplomitrium has a number of unique characters that distinguish it from other liverworts, such as lacking rhizoids. The vegetative stems possess a central water-conducting strand with large perforations derived from plasmodesmata. This central strand is surrounded by a cylinder of cells that conduct food throughout the plant. Such an arrangement is evocative of the xylem and phloem found in vascular plants. Although some thalloid liverwort species in the Pallaviciniaceae also possess a central conducting strand, Haplomitrium differs in having a food-conducting layer and in producing no callose.

Treubia also has features that differ from those found in other bryophytes, such as the differentiation of five identifiable zones in the stem midrib. Unlike other leafy species, the oil bodies in its cells are restricted to certain clusters of cells, as they are in the Marchantiopsida. These oil body clusters appear as dark spots in the leaves when the plant is held up to the light.

== Diversity ==
Living representatives of the group exhibit an essentially Gondwanan distribution with its center of diversity in Australasia. Such a distribution implies that the modern genera radiated prior to the beginning of the Cretaceous when Gondwana broke apart. Schuster proposes that species distributed in the northern hemisphere "rafted" on the Indian subcontinent to Asia, then spread across the Bering Strait into North America.

Most species in the Haplomitriopsida are found in south of the equator, though there are northern ones. The genus Treubia is restricted to the southern hemisphere, while Apotreubia has one species in New Guinea and another disjunct between eastern Asia and British Columbia. The genus Haplomitrium exhibits a wider distribution, with species in both North and South America, northern and central Europe, the Himalayas, Japan, and Australasia.

== Classification ==
The orders, families, and genera within class Haplomitriopsida are as follows:

- Subclass Haplomitriidae Stotler & Crand.-Stotl.
  - Order Calobryales Hamlin
    - Family Haplomitriaceae Dědeček
      - †Gessella C.Poulsen
      - Haplomitrium Nees
- Subclass Treubiidae Stotler & Crand.-Stotl.
  - Order Treubiales Schljakov
    - Family Treubiaceae Verd.
      - Apotreubia S.Hatt. & Mizut.
      - Treubia K.I.Goebel
