= Liverwort =

Liverworts Temporal range: 472–0 Ma Mid-Ordovician to present
- Metzgeria furcata, a species with a flat thallus

Scientific classification
- Kingdom: Plantae
- Clade: Embryophytes
- Clade: Setaphyta
- Division: Marchantiophyta; Stotler & Crand.-Stotl., 1977 emend. 2000

Type genus
- Marchantia L., 1753

Classes and orders
- Haplomitriopsida; Calobryales; Treubiales; Marchantiopsida; Blasiales; Lunulariales; Marchantiales; Neohodgsoniales; Sphaerocarpales; Jungermanniopsida; Fossombroniales; Jungermanniales; Metzgeriales; Pallaviciniales; Pelliales; Pleuroziales; Porellales; Ptilidiales

Synonyms
- Hepaticae Juss., 1789; Marchantiophytina Doweld, 2001; Hepaticophyta Crand.-Stotl et Stotler, 2000; Hepatophyta Stotler et Crand.-Stotl, 1977; Jungermanniophyta

Division of non-vascular land plants

Liverworts are non-vascular land plants in the division Marchantiophyta (/mɑːrˌkæn.ti.ˈɒf.ə.tə, -oʊ.ˈfaɪ.tə/). Liverworts, mosses, and hornworts are collectively known as bryophytes. Like mosses and hornworts, liverworts have a gametophyte-dominant life cycle in which the sporophyte is dependent on the gametophyte.

Some liverworts have a flat branching thallus, while others are leafy. They are distinguished from mosses by their single-celled rhizoids, the absence of a midrib or costa in the leaves, and the presence of membrane-bound complex oil bodies.

There are an estimated 9,000 species of liverworts, most of them leafy. They occur in many terrestrial ecosystems worldwide, especially in moist tropical regions, although some are adapted to deserts and other dry environments.

== Physical characteristics ==
=== Description ===
Most liverworts are small, from 2 to 20 millimetres (0.08 to 0.8 in) wide with individual plants less than 10 centimetres (4 in) long, so they are often overlooked. The most familiar liverworts, in the order Marchantiales, consist of a prostrate, flattened, ribbon-like or branching structure called a thallus (plant body). However, most liverworts produce flattened stems with overlapping scales or leaves in two or more ranks, the middle rank is often conspicuously different from the outer ranks; these leafy liverworts are in the order Jungermanniales.

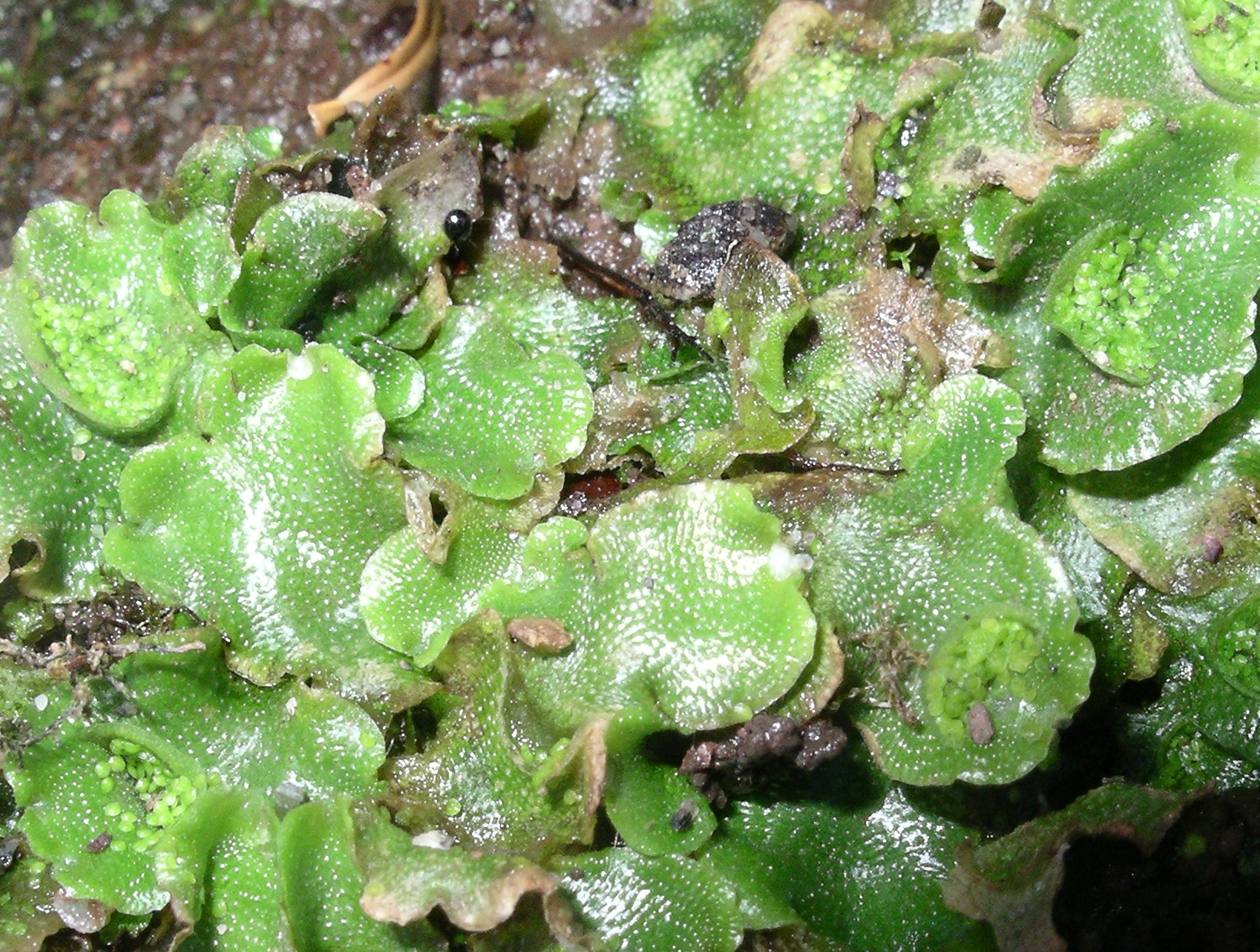
A Marchantiales liverwort with a flat thallus, Lunularia cruciata

A Jungermanniales leafy liverwort, Jungermannia hyalina

=== Recognition ===
Liverworts can most reliably be distinguished from similar-looking mosses by their single-celled rhizoids. Other differences are not universal for all mosses and liverworts, but the lack of clearly differentiated stem and leaves in species with a thallus, or deeply lobed or segmented leaves and the presence of leaves arranged in three ranks in leafy species, the absence of a midrib or costa in the leaves, and frequent dichotomous branching all point to the plant's being a liverwort. With a few exceptions, all liverworts undergo polyplastidic meiosis, in contrast to mosses and hornworts which have monoplastidic meiosis. Unlike any other embryophytes, most liverworts contain complex oil bodies containing isoprenoids and surrounded by membranes in some of their cells.

== Life cycle ==
=== Sexual ===
Liverworts, like other bryophytes, have a gametophyte-dominant life cycle, with the sporophyte dependent on the gametophyte. The sporophytes of many but not all liverworts are non-photosynthetic. Cells of the gametophyte plant each contain only a single set of genetic information, so liverworts are haploid for the majority of their life cycle. This contrasts sharply with the pattern in seed plants, where the haploid generation is represented only by the tiny pollen and ovule, while the diploid generation is the familiar plant. Another unusual feature is that the sporophytes (i.e. the diploid body) are very short-lived, withering away soon after releasing their spores.

Life cycle of a liverwort

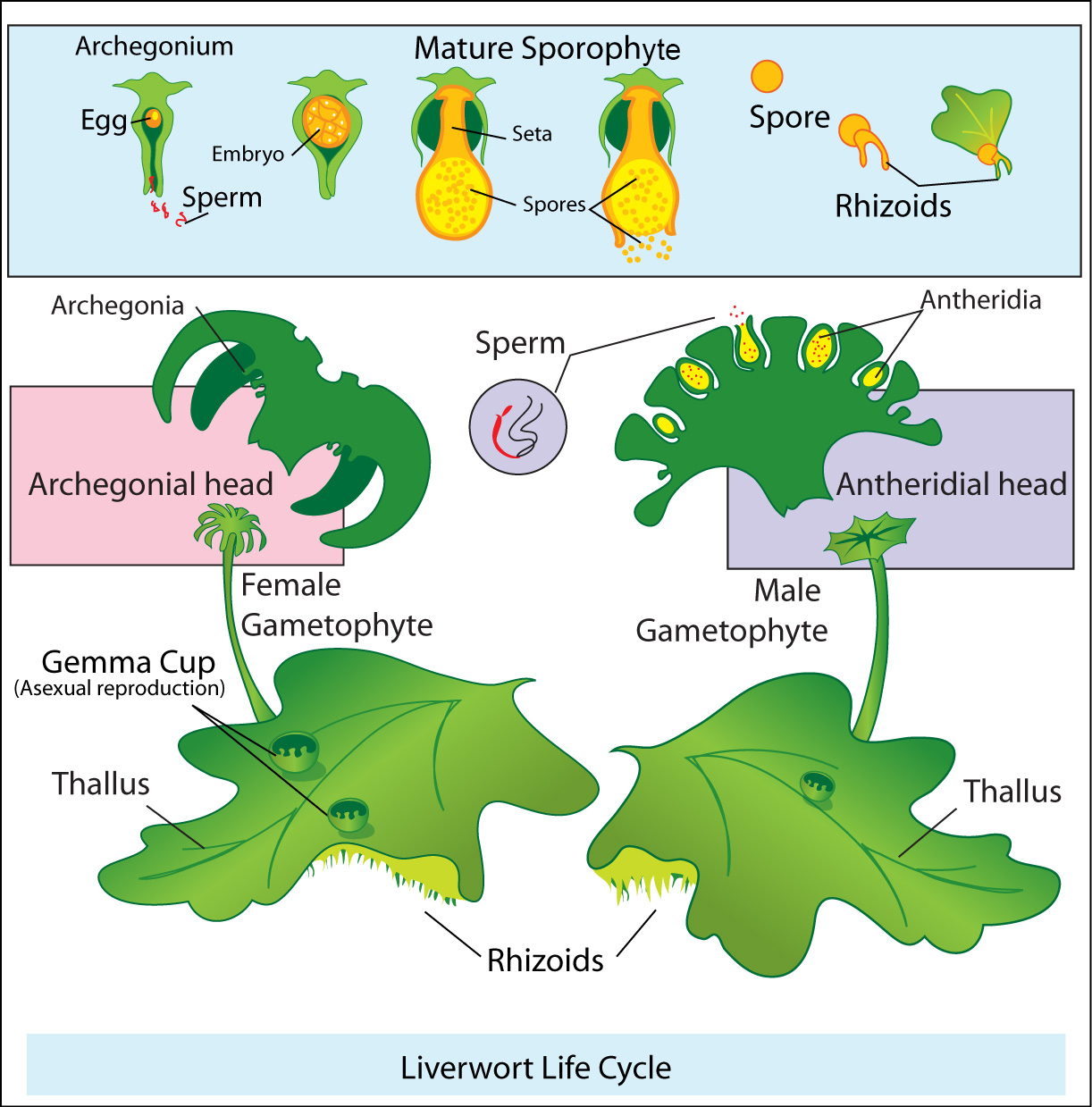
Sexual life cycle of a Marchantia-like liverwort

The life of a liverwort starts when a haploid spore germinates to produce a transitory protonema, which is either a mass of thread-like filaments or a flattened thallus. The protonema grows into a mature gametophyte plant that produces the sex organs. The male organ is known as an antheridium; it produces sperm cells. The female organ is known as an archegonium. Each archegonium has a slender hollow tube or neck down which the sperm swim to reach the egg cell.

Liverwort species may be either dioicous or monoicous. In dioicous liverworts, female and male sex organs are borne on different and separate gametophyte plants. In monoicous liverworts, the two kinds of reproductive structures are borne on different branches of the same plant. In either case, the sperm must move from the antheridia where they are produced to the archegonium where the eggs are held. The sperm of liverworts have two tail-like flagella that enable them to swim short distances.

When sperm reach the archegonia, fertilisation occurs, leading to the production of a diploid sporophyte. After fertilisation, the immature sporophyte within the archegonium develops three distinct regions: (1) a foot, which anchors the sporophyte in place and receives nutrients from its "mother" plant, (2) a spherical or ellipsoidal capsule, inside which the spores will be produced for dispersing to new locations, and (3) a seta (stalk) which connects the capsule to the foot. The mature capsule splits, scattering the spores.

Stages of the life cycle

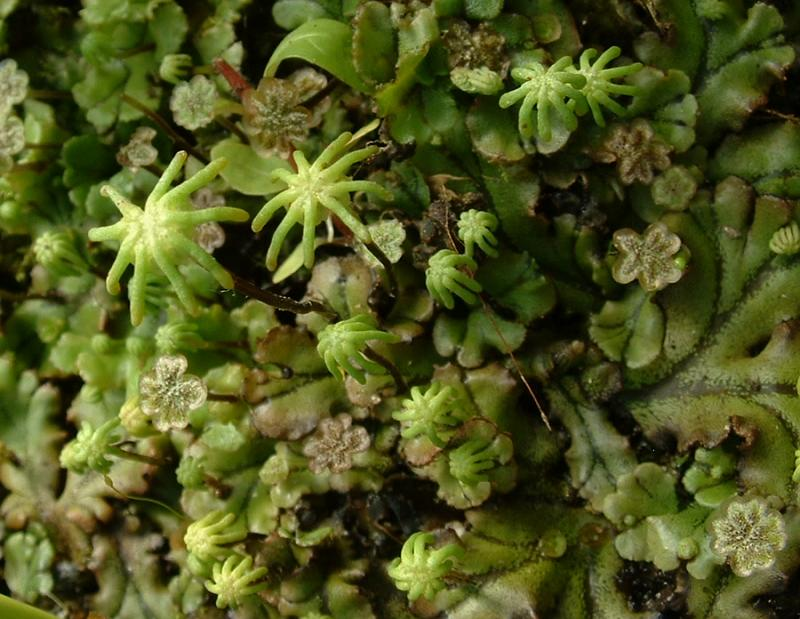
Marchantia polymorpha, a dioicous species, with antheridial and archegonial stalks on separate male and female thalli (gametophytes)

The archegonium of Porella

A sporophyte of Porella emerging from its archegonium

=== Asexual ===
Most liverworts are capable of asexual reproduction, where it is common and indeed the usual mode of reproduction. For example, in Riccia, when the older parts of the forked thalli die, the younger tips become separate individuals.

Some thallose liverworts such as Marchantia polymorpha and Lunularia cruciata produce small disc-shaped gemmae in shallow cups. Marchantia gemmae can be dispersed up to 120cm by rain splashing into the cups. In Metzgeria, gemmae grow at thallus margins. M. polymorpha is a common weed in greenhouses, often covering the entire surface of containers, as it spreads rapidly by the dispersal of its gemmae.

Asexual reproduction using gemmae

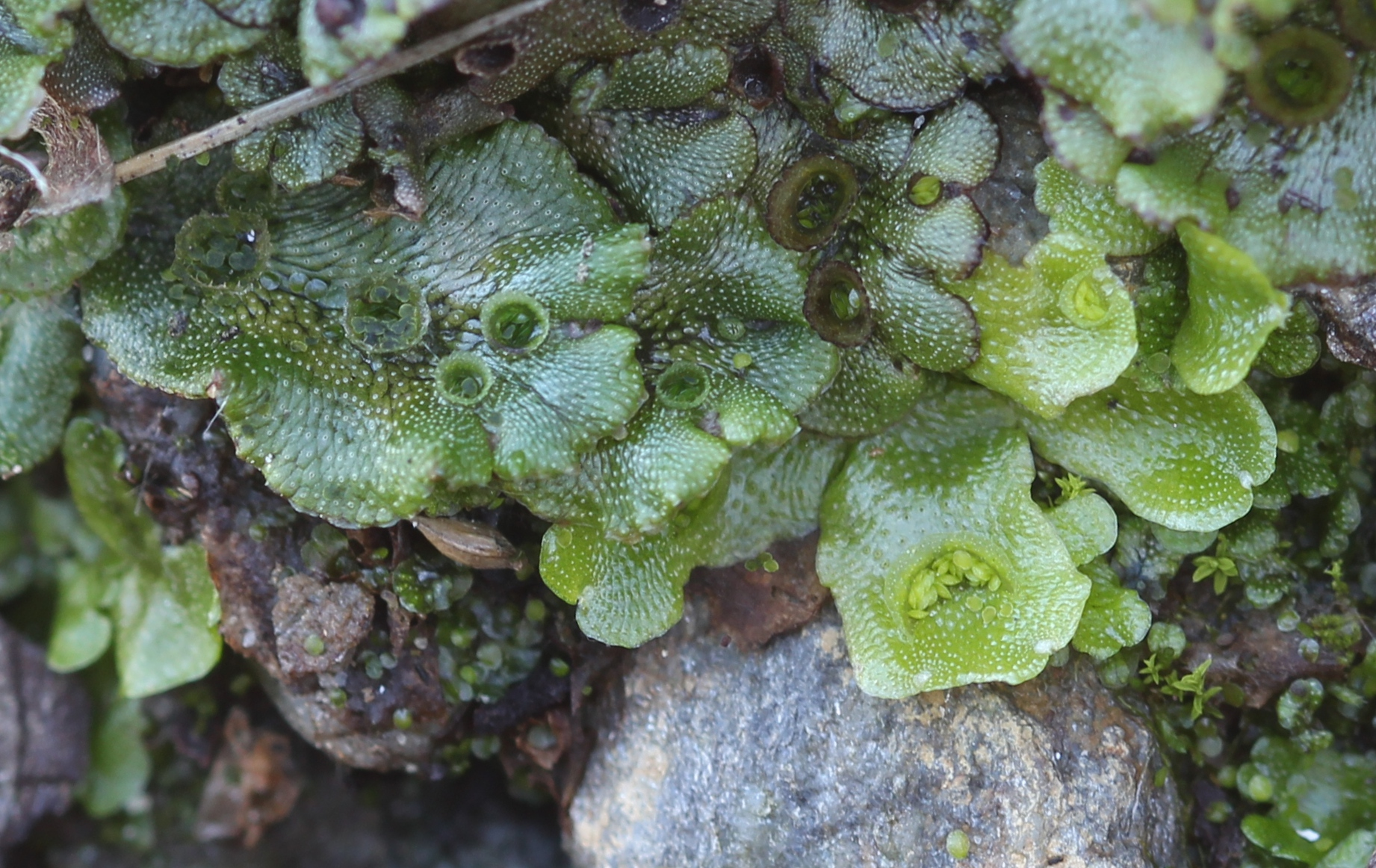
Liverworts Marchantia with round cups, and Lunularia with crescent cups, both containing gemmae. Gemmae dislodged by rain are visible at the bottom of the image.

== Ecology ==
Liverworts grow in many ecosystems across the planet except the sea and excessively dry environments, or those exposed to high levels of direct solar radiation. They are most common (both in numbers and species) in moist tropical areas.

Thalloid liverworts host symbiotic glomeromycete fungi. Species in the Aneuraceae, however, associate with basidiomycete fungi of the genus Tulasnella, while leafy liverworts host symbiotic basidiomycete fungi of the genus Serendipita.

Diversity of form and habitat

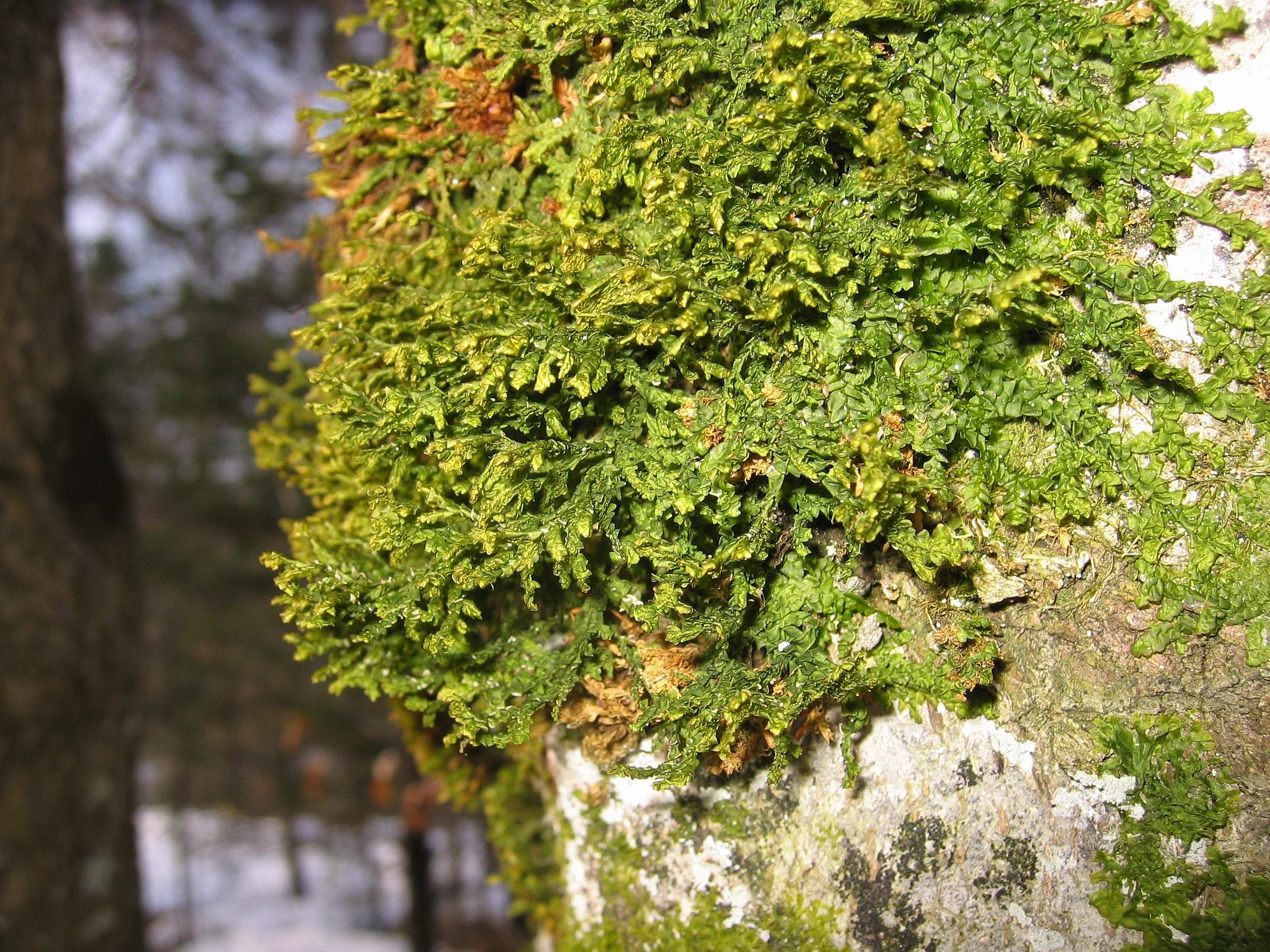
Porella platyphylla clump growing on a tree

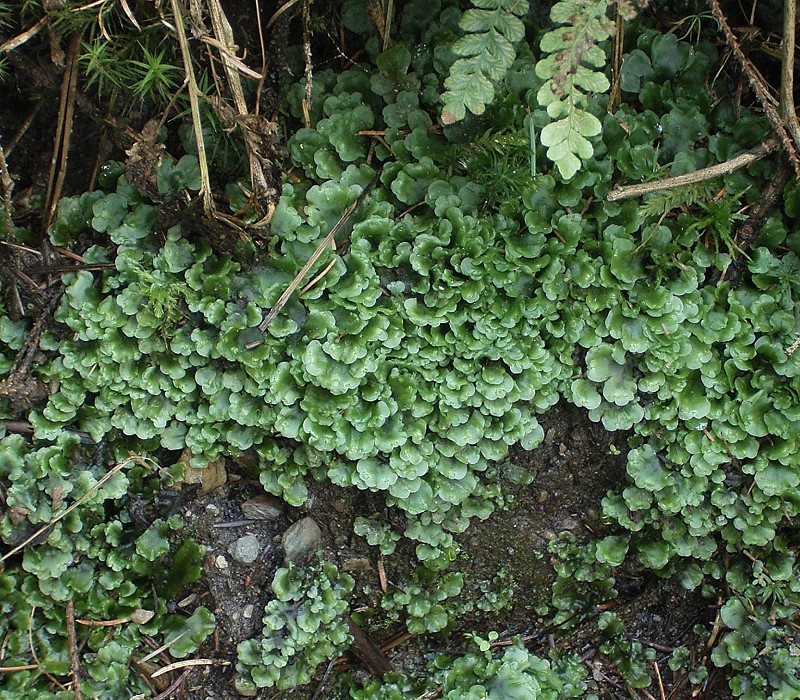
Pellia epiphylla, growing on moist soil

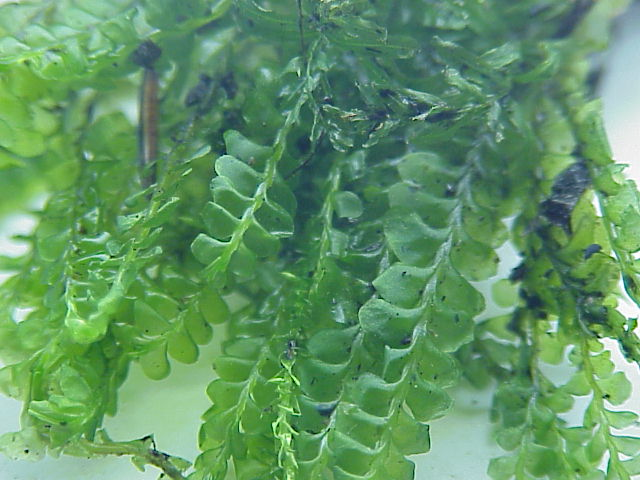
Plagiochila asplenioides (Jungermanniales)

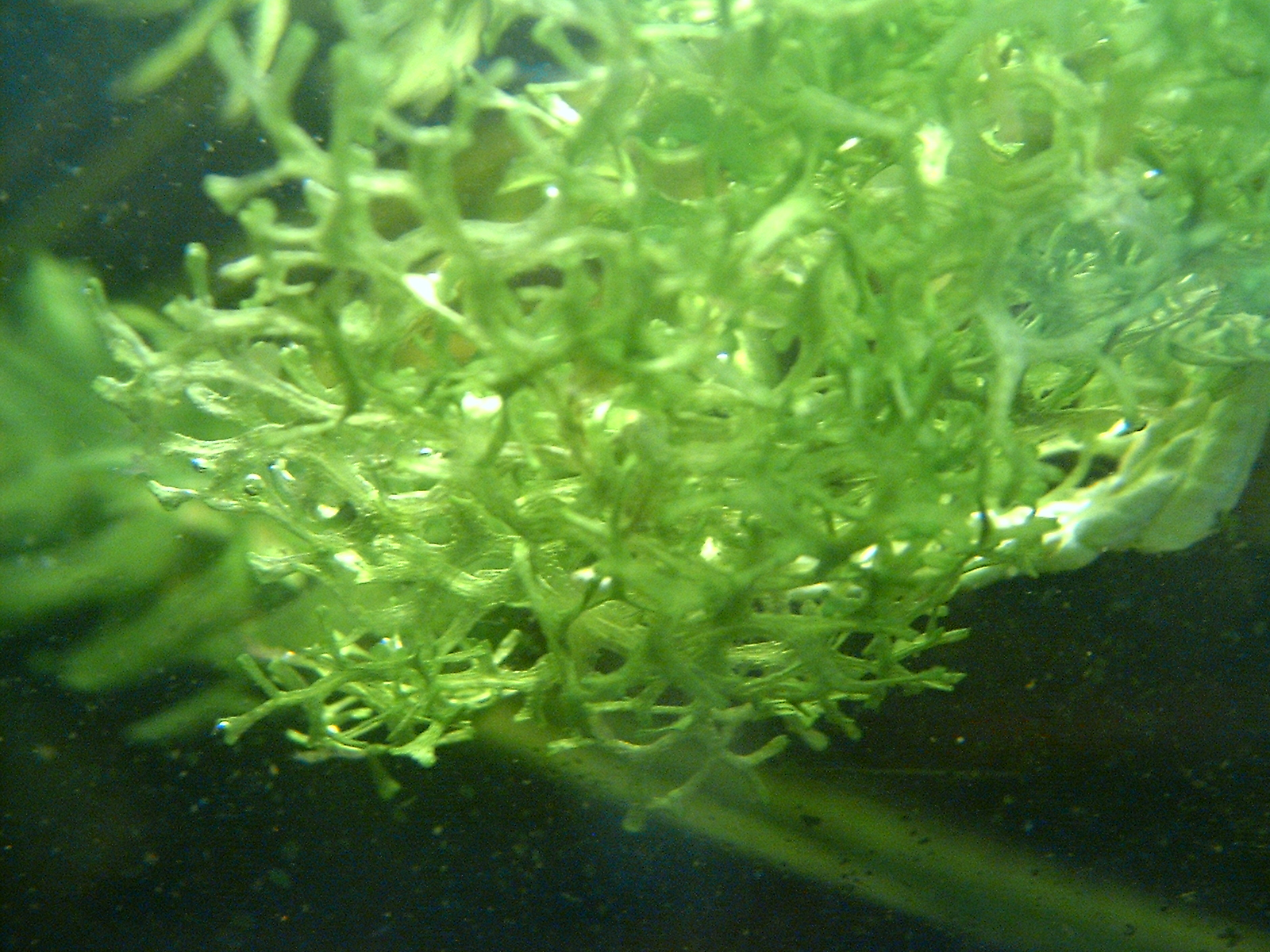
Riccia fluitans, an aquatic member of Marchantiales

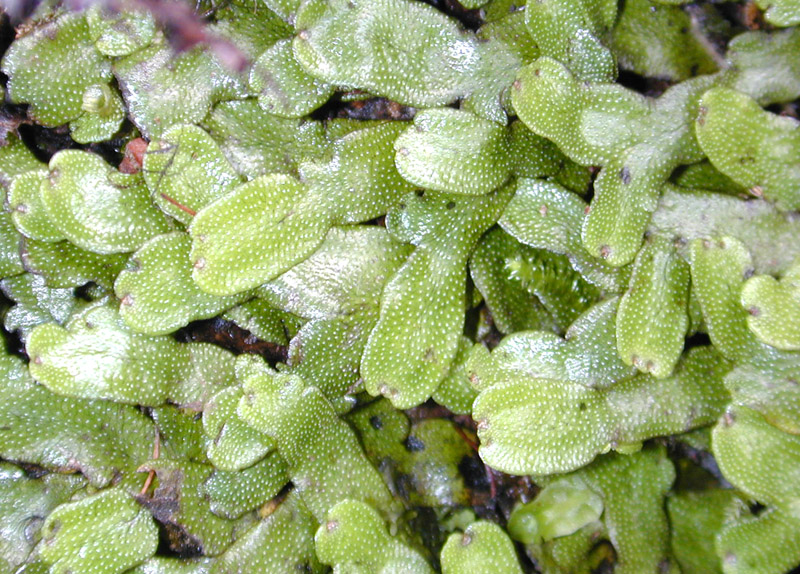
Conocephalum conicum

== Evolution ==
=== External phylogeny ===
Traditionally, the liverworts were grouped together with the mosses and hornworts in the Division Bryophyta, within which the liverworts made up the class Hepaticae (also called Marchantiopsida). Somewhat more recently, the liverworts were given their own division (Marchantiophyta), as bryophytes became considered to be paraphyletic. However, phylogenetic evidence indicates that liverworts are likely part of a clade ("Bryophyta sensu lato" or "Bryophyta Schimp.") alongside mosses and hornworts. Hence, it has been suggested that the liverworts should be de-ranked to a class called Marchantiopsida. In addition, there is strong phylogenetic evidence that liverworts and mosses form a subclade, Setaphyta.

Two of the most likely models for bryophyte evolution
'Monophyletic bryophytes'
'Liverworts plus mosses – basal'

- embryophytes
  - vascular plants
  - bryophytes
    - hornworts
    - setaphytes
      - mosses
      - liverworts

- embryophytes
  - - vascular plants
    - hornworts
  - setaphytes
    - mosses
    - liverworts

=== Fossil record ===
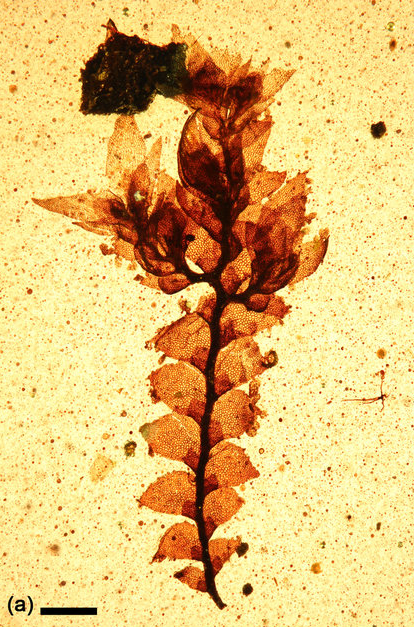
Radula cretacea, a liverwort fossil in Cretaceous amber from Burma

Stomata appear to be ancestral, and to have been lost in the liverwort lineage. Among the earliest fossils believed to be liverworts are compression fossils of Pallaviciniites from the Upper Devonian of New York. These fossils resemble modern species in the Metzgeriales. Another Devonian fossil, Protosalvinia, looks like a liverwort, but its relationship to other plants is uncertain, so it may not belong to the Marchantiophyta. In 2007, the oldest fossil species assignable to the liverworts was Metzgeriothallus sharonae from the Givetian (Middle Devonian) of New York. In 2010, five different types of fossilized liverwort spores were found in Argentina, dating to the much earlier Middle Ordovician, around 470 million years ago. In 2012, the earliest simple thalloid liverwort fossil, Riccardiothallus devonicus, was found in the Devonian of Yunnan, China. Total-evidence dating in 2023 combining morphological analysis of eight fossil taxa and genomic analysis of 56 extant species suggests that the Marchantiopsida radiated in the Middle Ordovician, while the Ricciaceae radiated in the Middle Jurassic. The most recent common ancestor of the complex thalloid liverworts was reconstructed as resembling Blasia with a flat thallus and a sporophyte capsule that split into four. Epiphytic thalloid liverworts evolved during the Triassic to the Cretaceous.

=== Internal phylogeny ===
Bryologists classify liverworts in the division Marchantiophyta. This divisional name is based on the name of the genus Marchantia. In addition, the liverworts have sometimes been called Hepaticophyta, from Greek ‘ἡπατικός "hepatikos", of the liver.

The Marchantiophyta may be subdivided into three classes:

- The Jungermanniopsida includes the two orders Metzgeriales (simple thalloids) and Jungermanniales (leafy liverworts).
- The Marchantiopsida includes the three orders Marchantiales (complex-thallus liverworts), and Sphaerocarpales (bottle hepatics), as well as the Blasiales (previously placed among the "Metzgeriales"), and the problematic genus Monoclea, sometimes placed in its own order Monocleales.
- A third class, the Haplomitriopsida, has been recognised as the sister group of the other liverworts; it comprises the liverwort genera Haplomitrium, Treubia, and Apotreubia.

Forrest 2006

- Marchantiophyta
  - - Haplomitriopsida
      - Haplomitriales
      - Treubiales
  - - Marchantiopsida
      - Blasiales
      - - Marchantiales
        - Sphaerocarpales
    - Jungermanniopsida
      - Metzgeriales (part)
      - - Metzgeriales (part)
        - Jungermanniales

Cole, Hilger & Goffinet 2021

- - - Haplomitriopsida
      - Haplomitriales
      - Treubiales
  - - Marchantiopsida
      - Blasiidae
        Blasiales
      - Marchantiidae
        - Neohodgsoniales
        - - Sphaerocarpales
          - - Lunulariales
            - Marchantiales
    - Jungermanniopsida
      - - Pelliidae
          - Pelliales
          - - Fossombroniales
            - Pallaviciniales
      - - Metzgeriidae
          - Metzgeriales
          - Pleuroziales
        - Jungermanniidae
          - Jungermanniales
          - - Porellales
            - Ptilidiales

A classification by Söderström et al. 2016

- Marchantiophyta Stotler & Crandall-Stotler 2000
  - Haplomitriopsida Stotler & Crandall-Stotler 1977
    - Calobryales Hamlin 1972
    - Treubiales Schljakov 1972
  - Marchantiopsida Cronquist, Takhtajan & Zimmermann 1966
    - Blasiidae He-Nygrén et al. 2006
      - Blasiales Stotler & Crandall-Stotler 2000
    - Marchantiidae Engler 1893 sensu He-Nygrén et al. 2006
      - Lunulariales Long 2006
      - Marchantiales Limpricht 1877 (complex thalloids)
      - Neohodgsoniales Long 2006
      - Sphaerocarpales Cavers 1910 (bottle liverworts)
  - Jungermanniopsida Stotler & Crandall-Stotler 1977
    - Jungermanniidae Engler 1893 (leafy liverworts)
      - Jungermanniales von Klinggräff 1858
      - Porellales Schljakov 1972
      - Ptilidiales Schljakov 1972
    - Metzgeriidae Bartholomew-Began 1990
      - Metzgeriales Chalaud 1930
      - Pleuroziales Schljakov 1972
    - Pelliidae He-Nygrén et al. 2006
      - Fossombroniales Schljakov 1972
      - Pallaviciniales Frey & Stech 2005
      - Pelliales He-Nygrén et al. 2006

There are about 9000 species of liverworts, at least 85% of which belong to the leafy group. The first liverwort genome sequence, from Marchantia polymorpha, was reported in 2017 although a few genes had already been identified and characterized.

== Relationship with humans ==
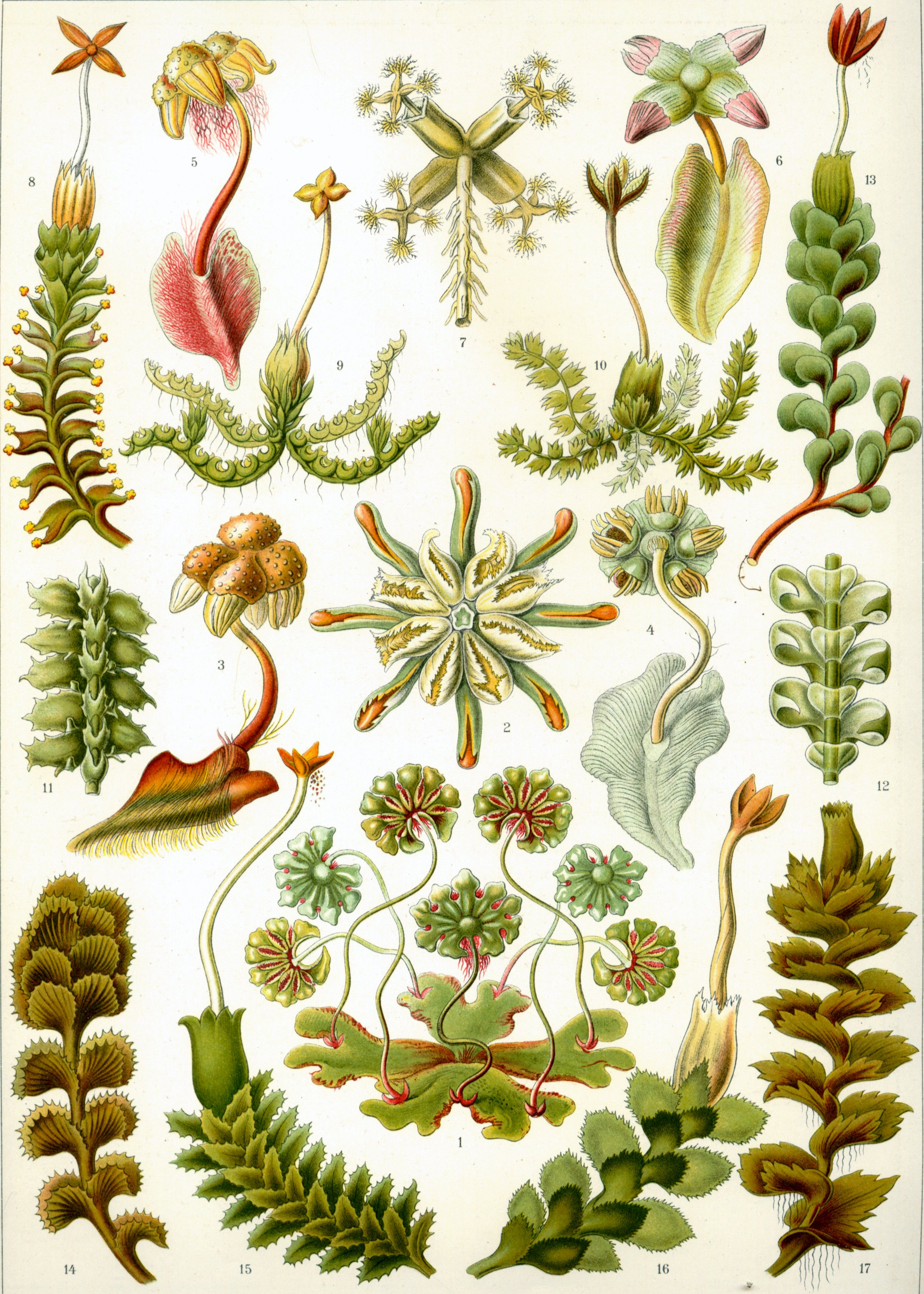
"Hepaticae" from Ernst Haeckel's Kunstformen der Natur, 1904

In ancient times, it was believed that liverworts cured diseases of the liver, hence their name, which in its Old English form liferwyrt means 'liver plant'. The archaic relationship of plant form to function is based on the medieval doctrine of signatures. At the start of the 20th century, the German zoologist Ernst Haeckel depicted liverworts in an elaborately symmetrical colour plate of the "Hepaticae" in his book Kunstformen der Natur.

Riccia fluitans (floating crystalwort) is an aquatic thallose liverwort sold for use in aquariums. Its slender branches float on the water's surface and provide habitat for both small invertebrates and the fish that feed on them.

Bryophyte genomics offers economic possibilities. Liverworts can be grown in petri dishes. Their gemmae provide large quantities of ready-made asexual clones. There is an efficient genetic transformation system; transgenic Marchantia polymorpha lines can be generated in 4 weeks. Many genetic engineering tools designed for angiosperms work in liverworts, including CRISPR systems. M. polymorpha could form a rapid system for testing plant genetic engineering and synthetic biology before moving into angiosperms. It may be practical to grow it in hydroponic systems and harvest high-value recombinant proteins. M. polymorpha had by 2026 become the model organism for molecular studies of liverworts.
