= Conocephalum supradecompositum =

Scientific classification
- Kingdom: Plantae
- Division: Marchantiophyta
- Class: Marchantiopsida
- Order: Marchantiales
- Family: Conocephalaceae
- Genus: Conocephalum
- Species: C. supradecompositum

Binomial name
- Conocephalum supradecompositum (Lindb.) Steph.

Species of liverwort

Conocephalum supradecompositum is a species of thalloid liverwort in the genus Conocephalum, of the order Marchantiales and the family Conocephalaceae. C. supradecompositum has a distribution that is mainly restricted to China and Japan. C. supradecompositum has very distinct chemical composition from the species Conocephalum conicum.

== Habitat and distribution ==
Conocephalum supradecompositum is mainly restricted to China and Japan.

== Morphology ==
Conocephalum supradecompositum is relatively small in size, compared to C. conicum, with a thallus roughly 2-3 cm long.

== Chemical composition ==
Conocephalum supradecompositum has very distinct chemical composition from the species C. conicum. Monoterpenoid content in C. supradecompositum is much less than that of C. conicum.

== See also ==
- Bryophyte
- Marchantiophyta
- Marchantiales
- Conocephalum
- Conocephalum conicum
- Conocephalum salebrosum
