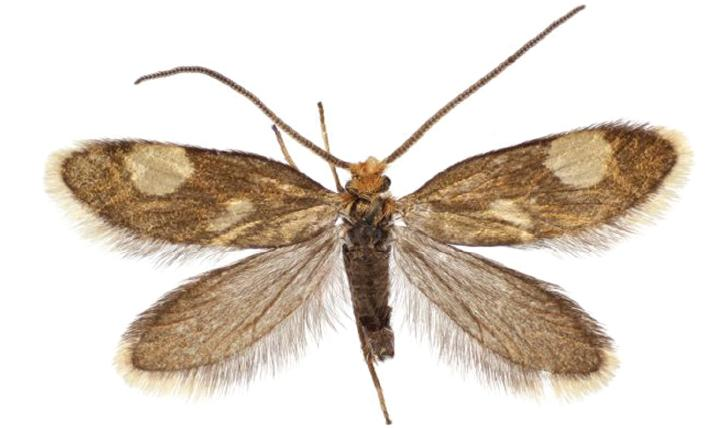

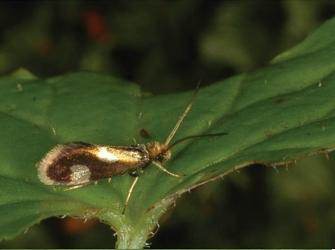

Scientific classification
- Kingdom: Animalia
- Phylum: Arthropoda
- Clade: Pancrustacea
- Class: Insecta
- Order: Lepidoptera
- Family: Micropterigidae
- Genus: Epimartyria
- Species: E. bimaculella

Binomial name
- Epimartyria bimaculella Davis & J.-F. Landry, 2012

= Epimartyria bimaculella =

Moth species in family Micropterigidae

Epimartyria bimaculella is a species of moth belonging to the family Micropterigidae. It was described by Davis and Landry in 2012. It is found in north-western Washington and southern British Columbia.

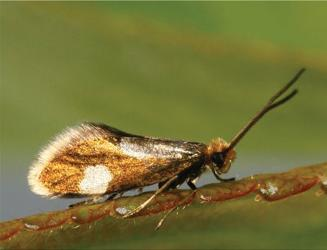

The length of the forewings is 4.6–5.3 millimetres (0.18–0.21 in). Adults of most resemble those of Epimartyria pardella in possessing dark fuscous forewings marked by pale golden spots. A total of two yellowish spots occur, with only a single large costal spot present beyond the middle of the forewing.

Specimens were captured by sweeping low lying vegetation or during diurnal flight along a shaded seepage in a Douglas fir–western red cedar forest where leafy liverworts grew. Adults were also observed perching on lower parts of plants such as Rubus spectabilis close to the liverwort habitat.

== Etymology ==
The species name is derived from the Latin bi (meaning two, double) and maculella (meaning little spot) and refers to the two, small, pale yellowish spots present on the forewings.
