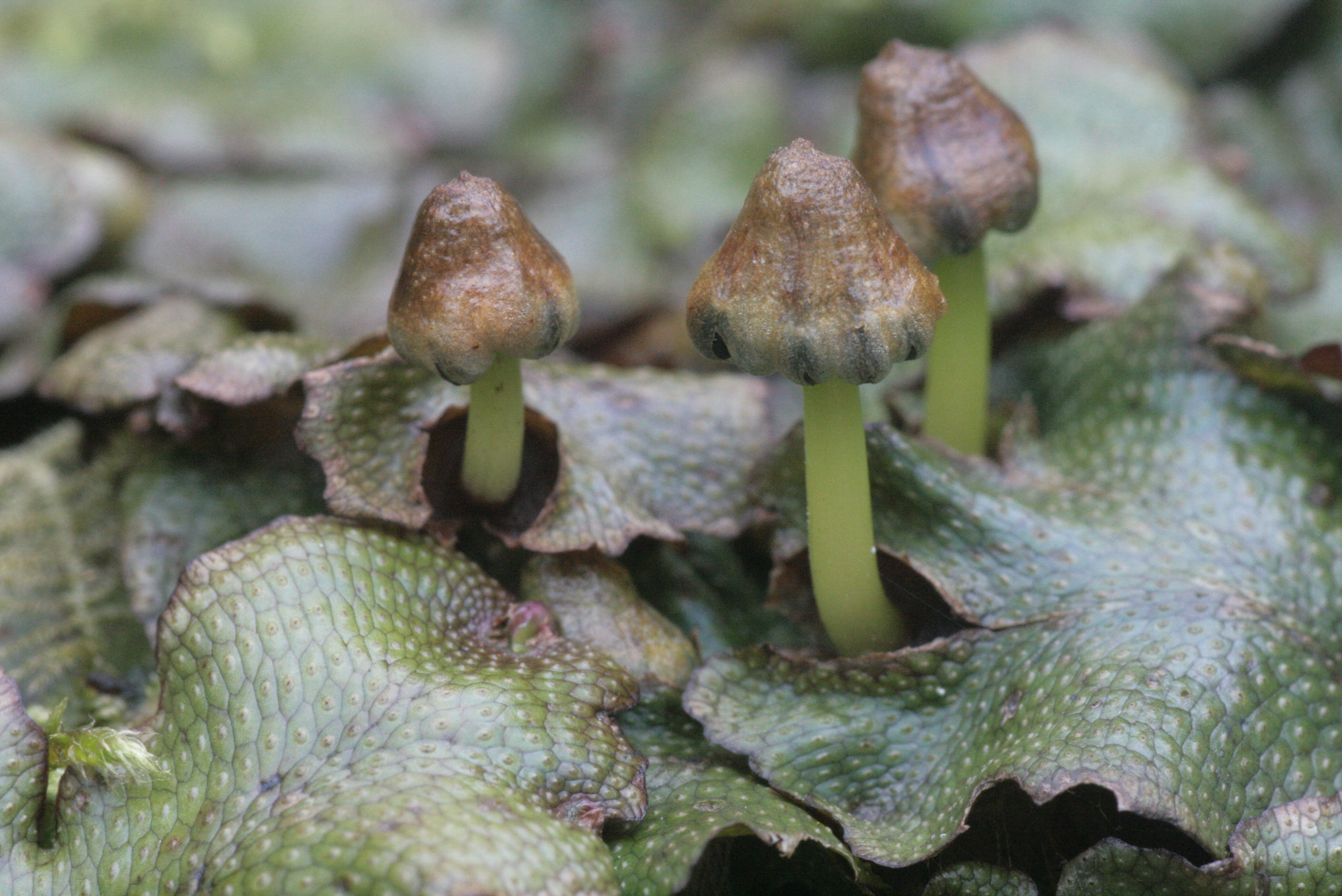
- Conocephalum conicum

Scientific classification
- Kingdom: Plantae
- Division: Marchantiophyta
- Class: Marchantiopsida
- Order: Marchantiales
- Family: Conocephalaceae; Müll.Frib. ex Grolle
- Genus: Conocephalum; Hill, 1773, corr. Wiggers 1780, >nom. et orth. cons.

= Conocephalum =

Genus of plants

Conocephalum is a genus of complex thalloid liverworts in the order Marchantiales and is the only extant genus in the family Conocephalaceae. Some species of Conocephalum are assigned to the Conocephalum conicum complex, which includes several cryptic species. Conocephalum species are large liverworts with distinct patterns on the upper thallus, giving the appearance of snakeskin. The species Conocephalum conicum is named for its cone-shaped reproductive structures, called archegoniophores. Common names include snakeskin liverwort, great scented liverwort and cat-tongue liverwort.

Species of Conocephalum are relatively common and widely distributed throughout North America, Europe and East Asia. Conocephalum often occurs in moist and shaded habitats and are also found in open woodlands, sandy banks, wet rocks and cliffs and moist soils. Species of Conocephalum are also often associated with calcareous substrates.

Conocephalum has a relatively large thallus with irregular branching. Plants grow by overlapping lobes, often creating large mats. Regarding reproduction, species of Conocephalum are dioicous. Species of Conocephalum produce different terpenes and aromatic compounds. Considerable variation in species have been identified based on chemical composition and different species have been identified based on their unique compounds. A unique sesquiterpene alcohol known as conocephalenol was identified and extracted form C. conicum.

== Classification and taxonomy ==
Some species of Conocephalum are placed in the Conocephalum conicum complex, which includes several cryptic species. Consequently, it has been challenging to identify the exact number of species in this genus. Cryptic species refers to a species which demonstrates a genetic difference but lacks morphological differences. Within liverworts, cryptic species are suggested to be related to both geographical disjunction and to reproductive biology in combination with isolation and habitat differentiation.

Molecular research has indicated that Conocephalum comprises a complex of six cryptic species (A, C, F, J, L and S). In 2005 C. conicum cryptic species S was described as a separate species, C. salebrosum. Conocephalum salebrosum has a wider distribution and is present in North America, in contrast to C. conicum. More recent examinations of the Conocephalum conicum complex in Japan and Taiwan have identified three new species within Conocephalum, C. orientalis, C. purpureorubum and C. toyotae, which were formerly described as C. conicum J, F, and R respectively.

=== Species ===
- Conocephalum conicum complex – includes several cryptic species:
  - Conocephalum conicum
  - Conocephalum salebrosum
  - Conocephalum orientalis
  - Conocephalum purpureorubum
  - Conocephalum toyotae
- Conocephalum supradecompositum

== Distribution ==
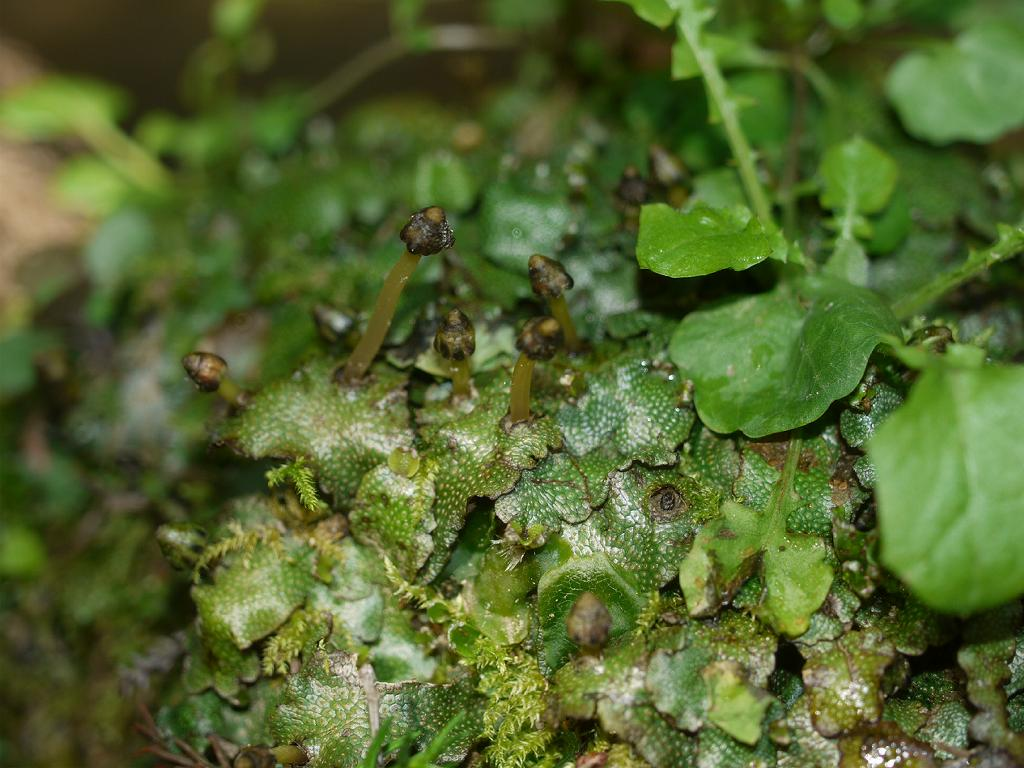
Conocephalum conicum growing in a moist and shady habitat

Species of Conocephalum are distributed throughout North America, Europe and East Asia. Conocephalum salebrosum displays the widest distribution and is found throughout North America, Europe and Asia. In North America, C. salebrosum occurs throughout Canada and parts of the United States and has also been reported from Russia. In contrast to C. salebrosum, C. conicum is found throughout Europe and has been recorded in Norway, Finland, Great Britain, Ireland, Belgium, France, Germany, Czech Republic, Austria, Hungary, Romania, Italy, Portugal, Spain, Croatia, Bulgaria, Greece, Ukraine, Poland and Russia.

The species C. supradecompositum is more restricted in its distribution and is mainly found in China and Japan. Regarding the most recently described species of Conocephalum, C. purpureorubum has been observed in Japan, China, Taiwan and South Korea and C. orientalis has been found in Japan and Taiwan.

== Habitat ==
Species of Conocephalum often occur in moist and shaded habitats. Conocephalum species also grow in specialized micro-habitats near both running and standing water. Conocephalum conicum is often found in open woodlands, sandy banks, wet rocks and cliffs and moist soils. Both C. conicum and C. salebrosum are strongly associated with calcareous substrates. It has also been suggested that C. salebrosum is likely more tolerant of desiccation than C. conicum.

== Morphology ==
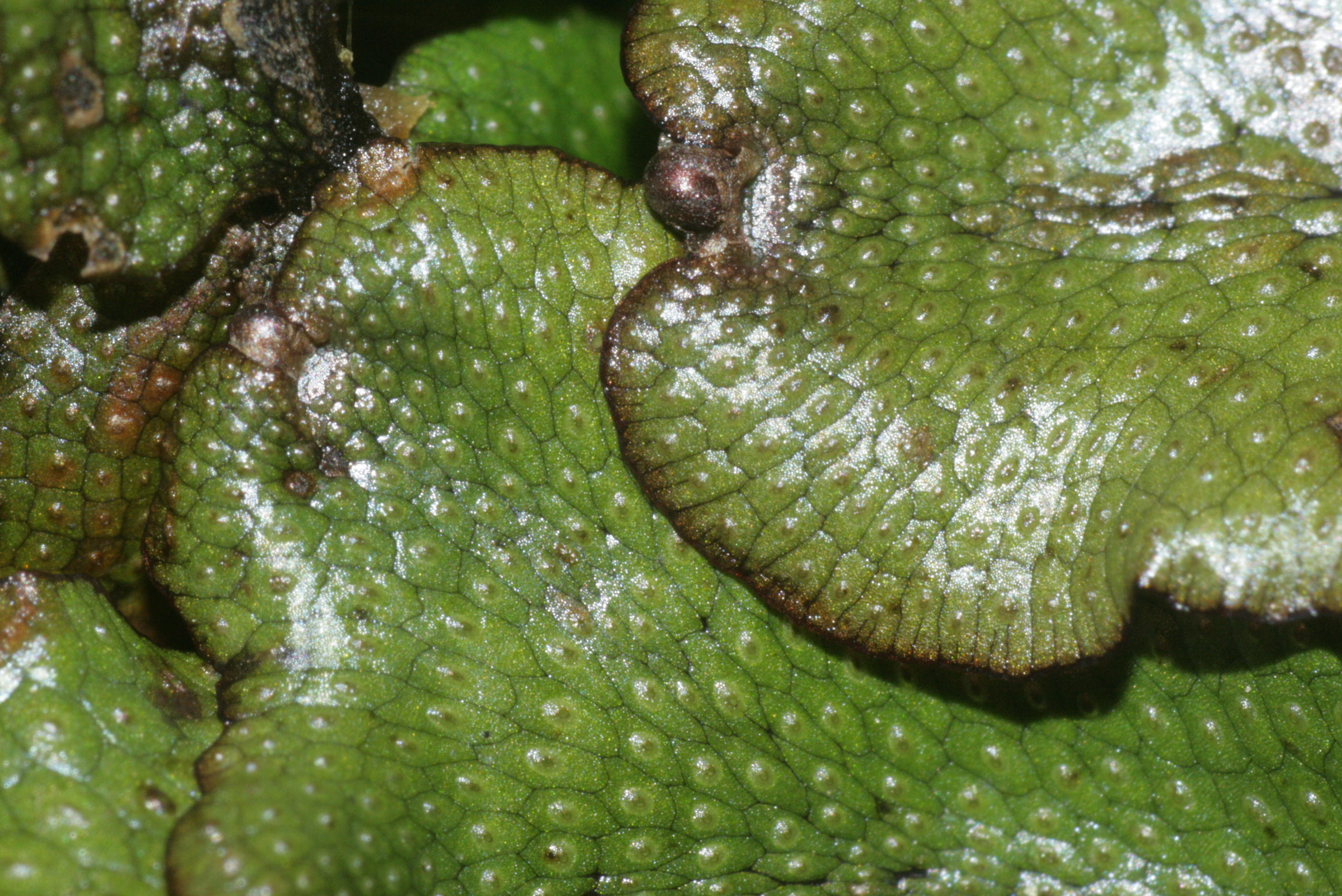
Conocephalum conicum, the thallus is distinctly shiny in appearance

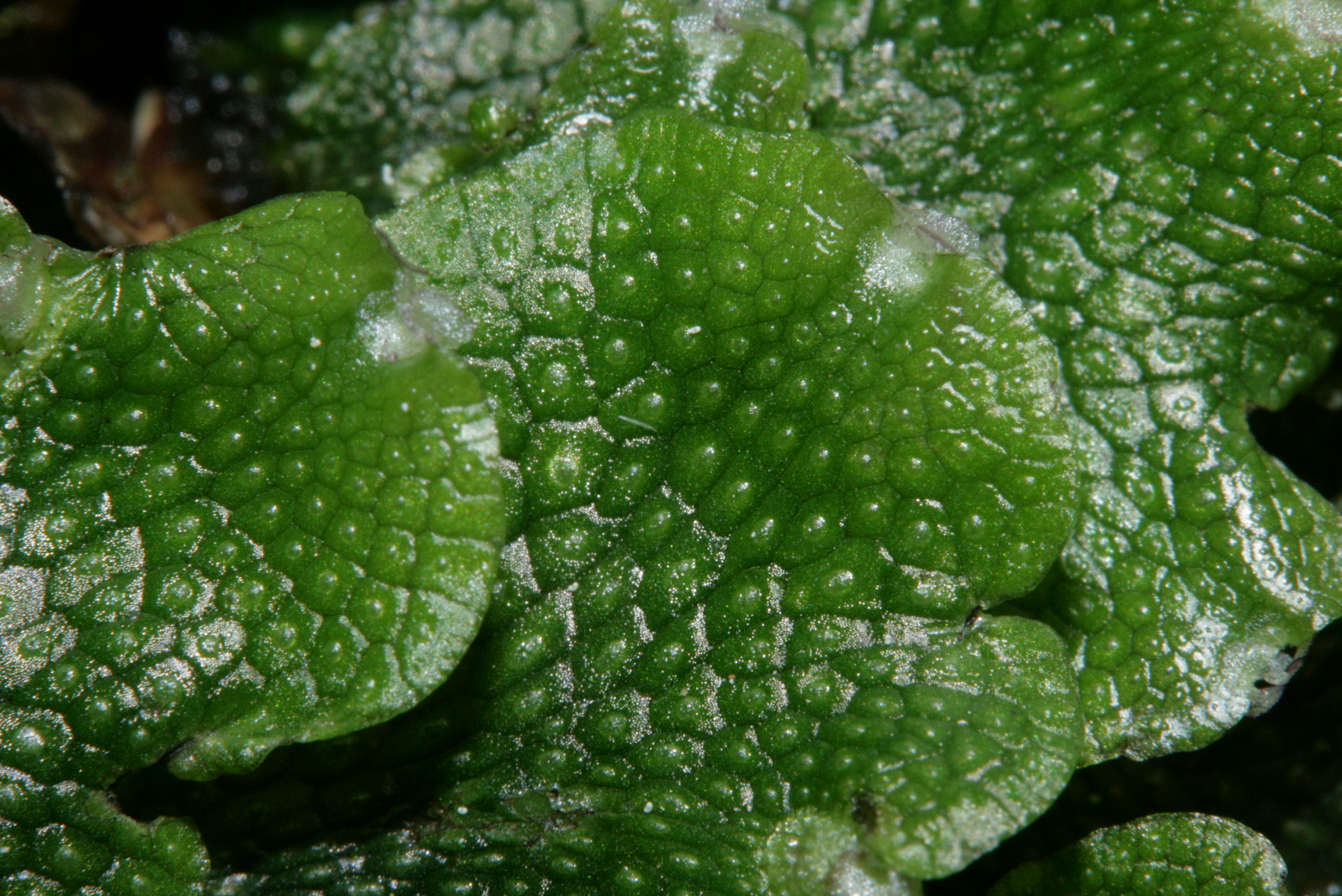
Conocephalum salebrosum, the thallus is dull in appearance

Conocephalum conicum and C. salebrosum share some similarities in morphological characteristics, in addition to having their own unique traits which help distinguish the two species.

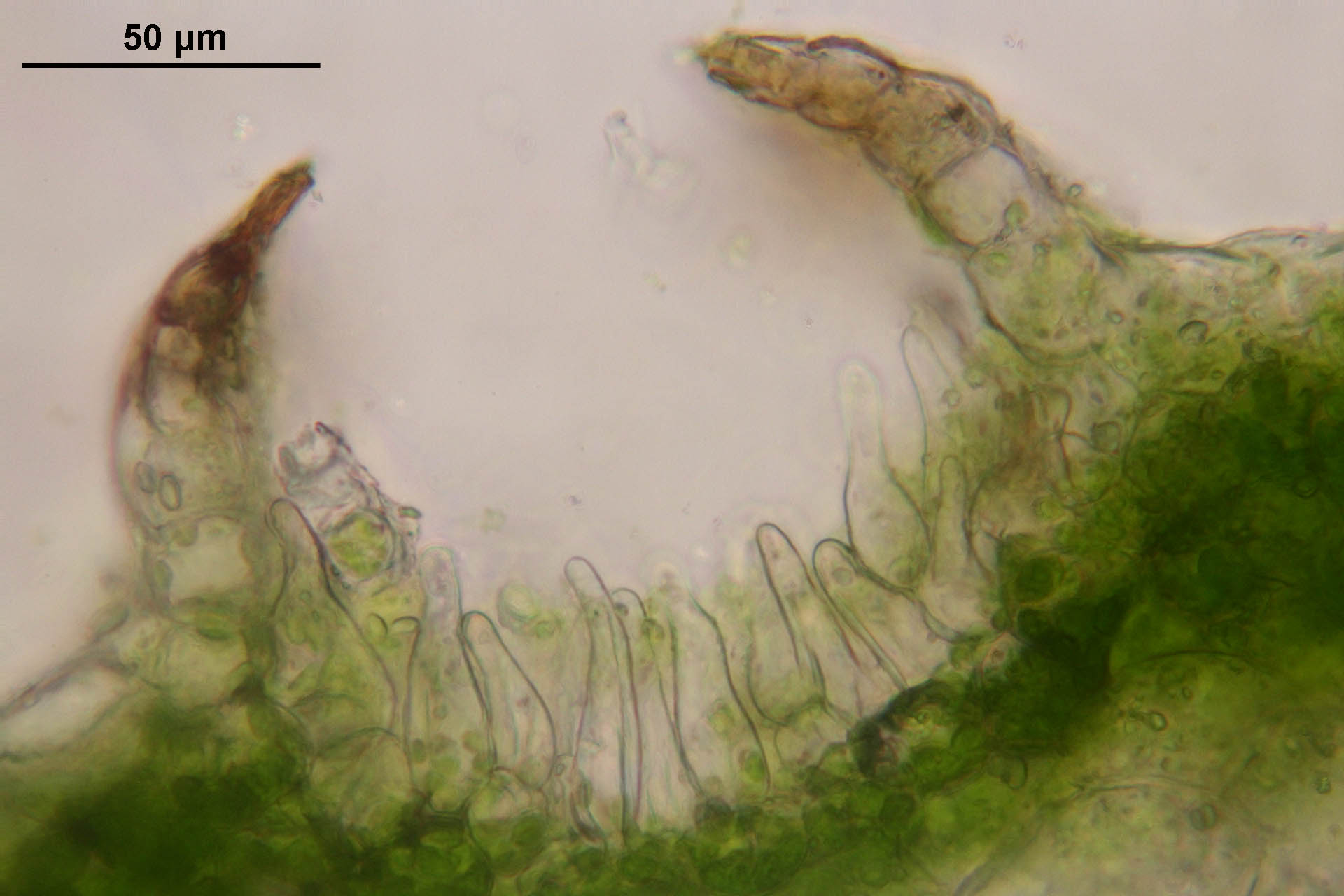
Conocephalum salebrosum, air pore present in the upper surface of the thallus

=== Gametophyte ===
The vegetative structure of Conocephalum is a thallus which has the appearance of a flattened body of plant tissue. The thallus is irregularly branched and relatively large, reaching lengths of roughly 20-24 cm. In contrast to C. conicum and C. salebrosum, the thallus of C. supradecompositum is relatively small, measuring 2-3 cm long. The thallus grows by developing lobes which wither away as the plant matures. Plants of C. salebrosum often grow by overlapping lobes, sometimes creating large mats.

Species of Conocephalum have a thallus that is either dull in appearance, such as C. salebrosum, or distinctly shiny, such as C. conicum. The upper surface of the thallus has characteristic hexagonal outlines formed by shallow grooves around each air chamber. Photosynthetic tissue and chloroplasts are located within the air chambers. In the middle of each air chamber is a white-ringed pore. The upper walls of large air chambers are often visible on the surface of the thallus. The air chamber pore remains open, in contrast to the stomata of vascular plants where the pores can open and close.

The underside of the thallus has both rhizoids and scales. The scales are purple in colour and are arranged along the middle of the underside of the thallus. Rhizoids are also present on the underside of the thallus. There are two types of rhizoids, both long smooth rhizoids and short pegged rhizoids. The short rhizoids are thought to play a role in absorbing water and nutrients. In contrast, the longer rhizoids help anchor the thallus to the underlying substrate. The rhizoids are single-celled, in contrast to the multicellular rhizoids found in mosses.

==== Complex oil bodies ====
Liverworts cells often contain complex oil bodies. The oil bodies are intracellular organelles bounded by a single membrane. The oil bodies have been known to contain a variety of unique phytochemicals, such as terpenes and flavonoids. The function of oil bodies is still poorly understood. It has been suggested that oil bodies might function as a deterrent to herbivory or could protect from cold temperatures or harmful ultraviolet radiation.

=== Sporophyte ===
The sporophyte consists of an unbranched stalk called a seta, which bears a terminal spore capsule called a sporangium. The sporangia of Conocephalum are borne beneath stalked gametophytic structures called archegoniophores. In contrast to mosses, the sporophyte matures before the seta elongates. Unlike mosses, liverwort sporophytes lack stomata, a columella and peristome teeth.

== Life cycle ==
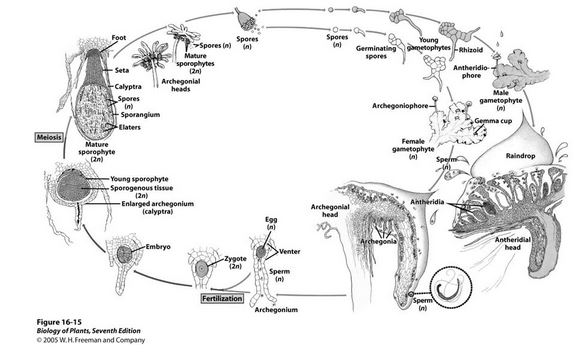
General life cycle of Marchantia liverwort

The life cycles of liverworts involves alternating haploid gametophyte and diploid sporophyte generations. The gametophyte generation is more dominant, while the sporophyte generation is relatively short-lived. The gametophyte produces haploid gametes, egg and sperm, which fuse to form a diploid zygote. The zygote then develops into a sporophyte which ultimately produces haploid spores through meiosis. The sporophyte requires nutrients supplied by the gametophyte to sustain growth and development.

The life cycle of Marchantia liverworts also applies to Conocephalum, with the exception that Conocephalum lacks a stalked antheridiophore and instead has small flat antheridial heads on the surface of the thallus.

== Reproduction ==
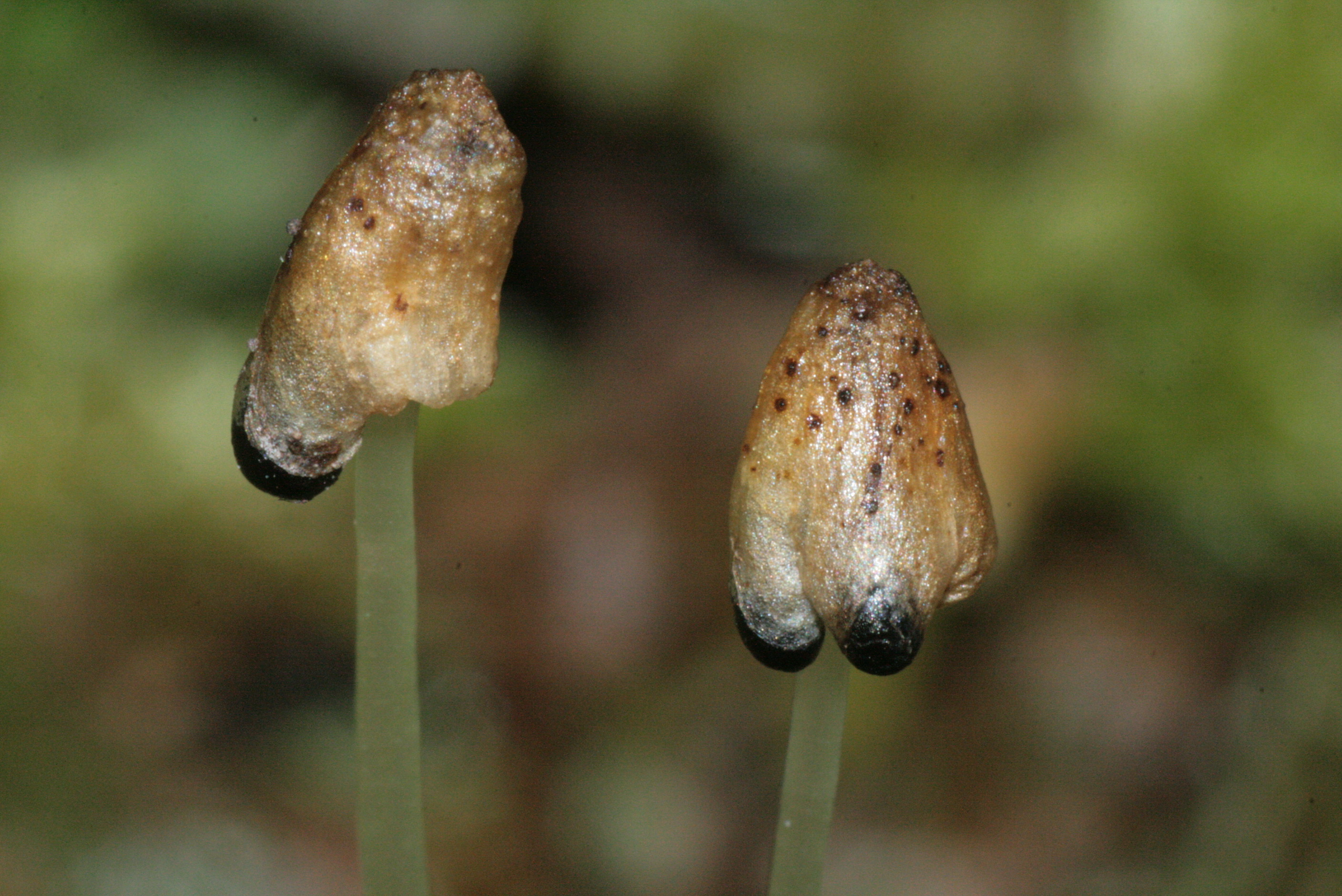
Conocephalum conicum, sporophytes (black) hanging beneath the umbrella-shaped, stalked archegoniophores

Liverworts reproduce through both sexual and asexual reproduction. In natural populations, the high genetic variation observed suggests that sexual reproduction might dominate. Species of Conocephalum are dioicous, meaning that the male and female reproductive structures are produced on separate plants.

=== Sexual reproduction ===
In Conocephalum the male and female reproductive parts are embedded in receptacles on separate plants. On male plants, the receptacle is slightly raised, lacking a stalk, and often circular or oval shaped. Antheridia are embedded in the receptacle and at maturity the sperm is released into the air. In contrast, on female plants the receptacles are dome-shaped, with several drooping lobes at the end of an erect stalk. The receptacles are often described as a tiny umbrella, with the archegonia beneath.

Gametophytes produce eggs and sperm in the archegonia and antheridia, respectively. Fertilization occurs when the sperm reach the egg within the archegonia of a female plant. Once fertilization occurs, the ovule within an archegonium develops into a sporophyte. Mature sporangia on the underside of the receptacle resemble black capsules. These capsules split open to release both spores and elaters, which are dispersed mainly by wind. The elaters function to propel spores during dispersal.

Conocephalum elaters are unique and display a wide range of variability in shape, size and number. Often the abundance of elaters within a capsule are 2-3 times more abundant than spores. Elaters form from an initial mother cell which develops into a diploid cell with spiral thickenings. In contrast, spores develop from an initial diploid mother cell that ultimately forms haploid spores by meiosis.

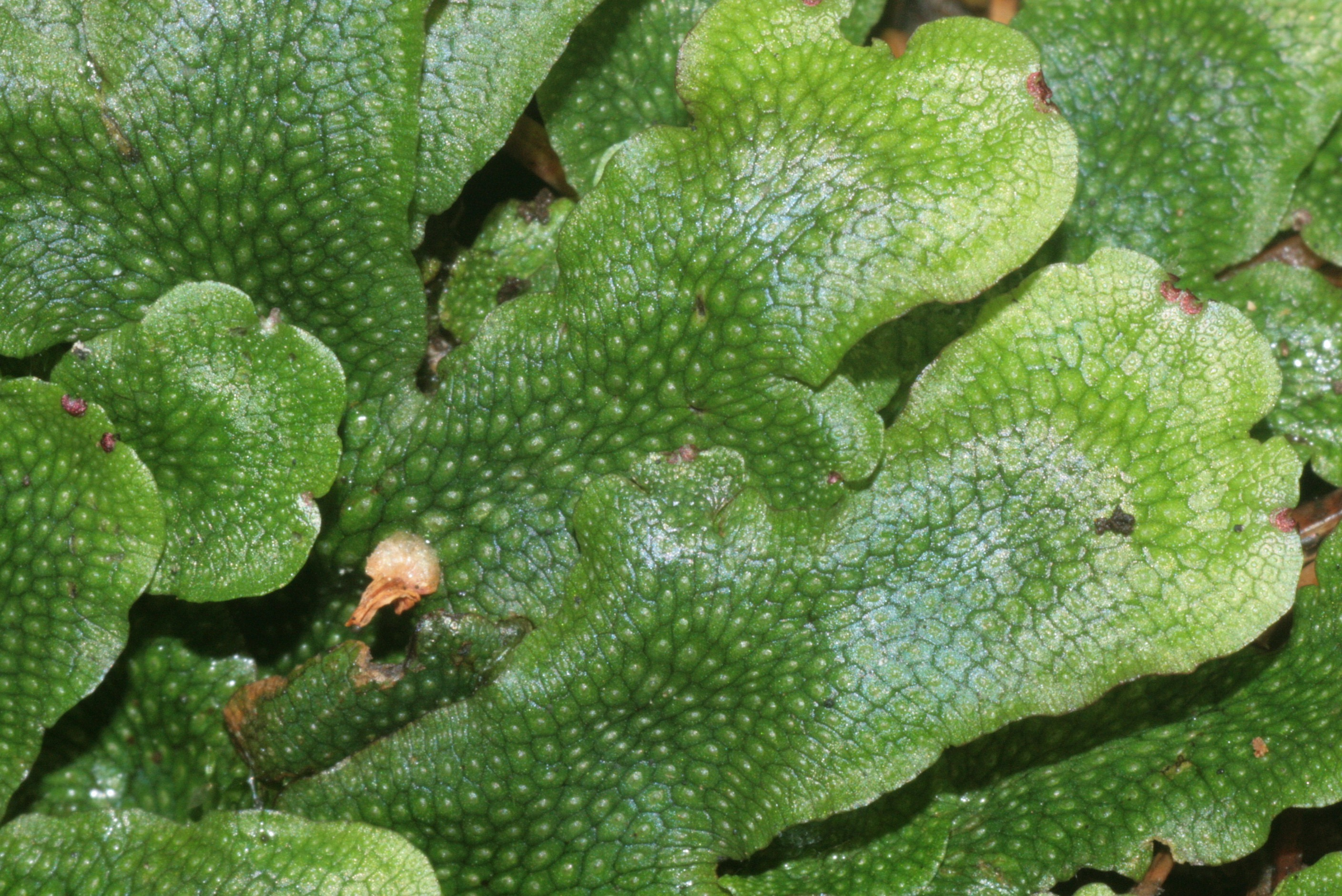
Conocephalum conicum, thallus with scales at the tips covering new spring buds

=== Asexual reproduction ===
The production of gemmae is a common method of asexual reproduction in liverworts. Gemmae are small packets of tissue consisting of haploid cells that are genetically identical with those of the parent plant. They are dispersed by rainfall and ultimately grow into new individuals. In C. conicum, gemmae are located on the lower layers of the thallus and are released as the thallus degrades. In contrast, C. salebrosum does not produce gemmae.

Vegetative reproduction can occur when a piece of the thallus breaks off and is transported away from the parent plant. The individuals resulting from vegetative reproduction are genetically identical to the parent plant and therefore clonal colonies often exist as either all male or all female.

Conocephalum species are perennial, meaning that they can overwinter and produce new growth in the spring. These new buds are covered and protected by small scales.

== Biochemistry ==
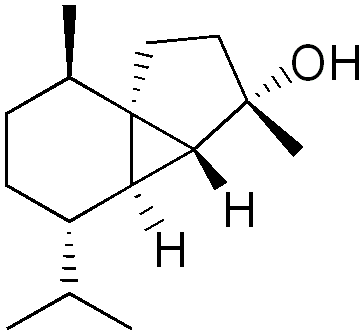
Chemical structure of Cubebol

Many liverworts produce different terpenes and aromatic compounds. Terpenoids and aromatic compounds are often accumulated within the oil bodies of many liverworts, including Conocephalum. Within Conocephalum, considerable variation in species have been identified based on chemical composition and these compounds been used to identify different cryptic species.

Three different groups of Conocephalum were identified baed on their unique primary volatile compounds. For example, the compound cubebol, a sesquiterpene alcohol, is characteristic of C. salebrosum. It has also been noted that C. supradecompositum has a distinct chemical composition compared to C. conicum as well, mainly that the Monoterpenoid content in C. supradecompositum is much less than observed in C. conicum.

A unique sesquiterpene alcohol known as conocephalenol was identified and extracted from C. conicum. Conocephalenol has a unique chemical skeleton that is characteristic of a sesquiterpenes present in red algae.

== Associations with other species ==
=== Fungal interactions ===
Conocephalum can form associations with fungi that are similar to the mycorrhizal associations observed vascular plants. Molecular analyses demonstrated that Conocephalum contained fungal endophytes from the group of fungi known as the Glomeromycota.

Conocephalum conicum often colonizes bare soils or rocky substrates, where mineral nutrients can often be limiting. The fungal endophyte establishes a complex relationship with C. conicum, which is characterized by the formation of arbuscules. These fungi form a highly branched mycelium outside of the plant which then colonize the outside of the rhizoids and pass into the gametophyte. The fungal infection induces grown of fungal hypha within the host cells of C. conicum. This association of the fungal hypha with the hosts plastids suggests that photosynthates produced through photosynthesis in C. conicum are likely transferred to the fungus. A similar situation regarding this fungal association has also been identified in the thalloid liverwort Pellia epiphylla. Although these associations are common in vascular plants, they have rarely been described in non-vascular plants.

=== Animal interactions ===
==== Herbivory ====
Approximately 25 species of moth which are endemic to East Asia associate exclusively with Conocephalum. The larval stage of Epimartyria pardella moths feed on C. conicum. In addition, the fungal species Loreleia marchantiae also feeds on C. conicum.

==== Pathogens ====
The fungal pathogen belonging to the genus Pythium has often been isolated from infected rhizoids and thallus of Conocephalum. Bryoscyphus conocephali is another fungal pathogen that has been associated with C. conicum.

== Human applications ==
=== Conocephalum as a bioindicator for pollution ===
Conocephalum conicum has been identified as being tolerant of heavy metals and has therefore been suggested to have a possible role as a bioindicator for pollution. Conocephalum conicum takes up ions from both the soil and the atmosphere. Therefore, heavy metals contamination of C. conicum is related not only to air pollution, but environmental contamination from different sources. Recent research has also examined C. conicum as a bioindicator for cadmium pollution. Cadmium a toxic metal and considered the third highest contaminant, after mercury and lead. Conocephalum conicum was shown to respond to cadmium stress by changing its biological activity. These biological changes could be used as biomarkers for cadmium pollution.

Chemical structure of aflatoxin B1 found in Aspergillus fungi

=== Anti-fungal activity ===
Conocephalum conicum has been suggested to have a possible role in the management of food borne disease caused by species of Aspergillus fungi. Aspergillus produces highly potent toxins, carcinogens, referred to as aflatoxins. Aflatoxins are harmful both plants and animals. Aspergillus can cause disease in many important crops, which can ultimately cause disease in humans. Conocephalum has been shown to have a variety of bioactive compounds which promote anti-fungal property against Aspergillus.

=== Ethnomedicine ===
Throughout North America, China and India, liverworts such as Conocephalum have been used for ethnomedical purposes. Conocephalum is known to be important to Bhotia, Raji, Tharus and Boxas tribes in Pithoragarh district of Kumaon Himalaya. Conocephalum conicum is used to treat burns, and the extract of C. conicum is also used in treating gallstones. Conocephalum has also demonstrated antidote activity against venomous snake bites. The role of Conocephalum regarding modern medicine has yet to be investigated.

=== Cosmetic industry ===
Liverworts often contain highly pungent compounds. Conocephalum species often exude an odour that is characteristic of turpentine. The odour is thought to be related to the presence of monoterpenoids. The compound conocephalenol is widely used in the cosmetic industry for its odourant properties.

== Photo gallery ==
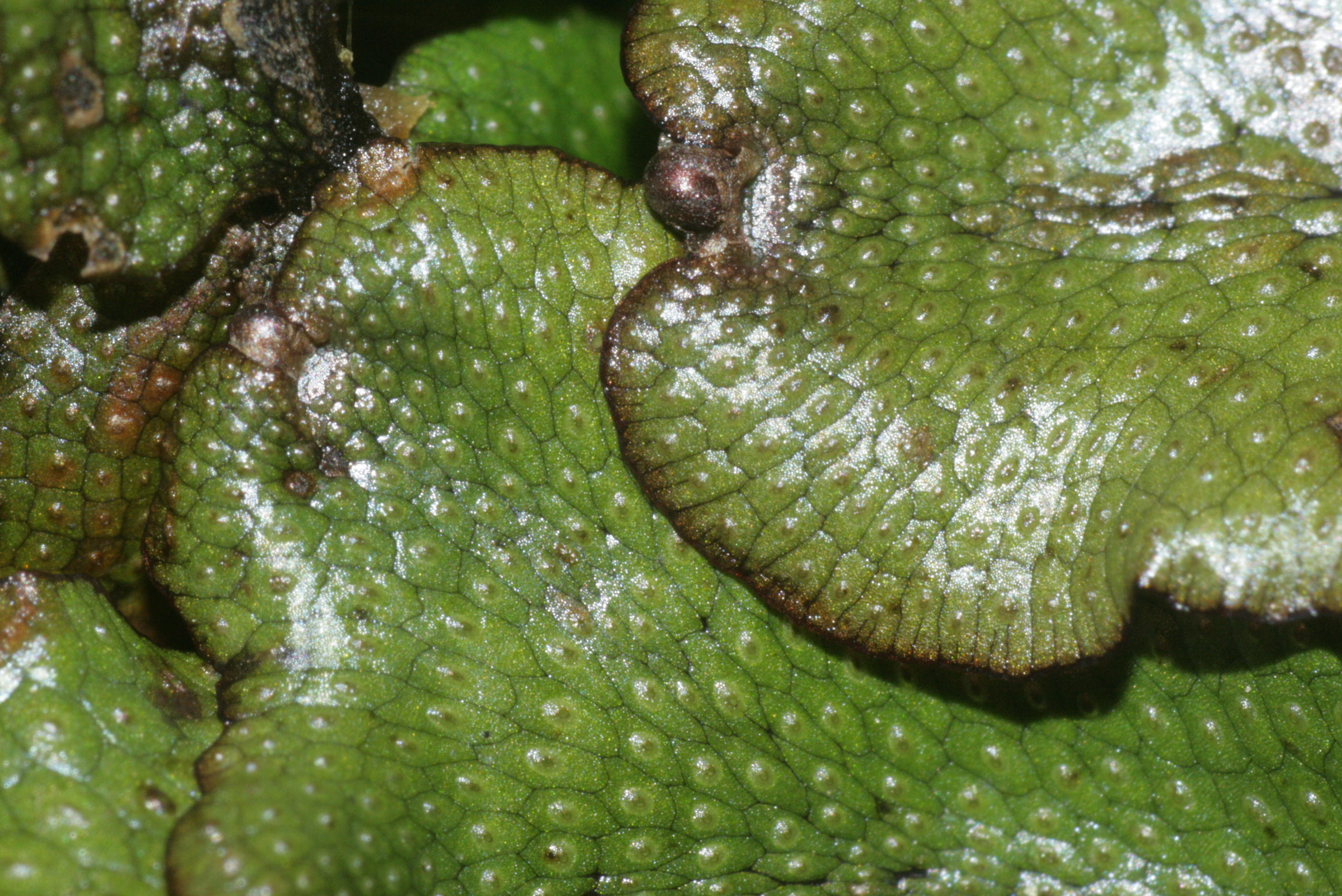
Conocephalum conicum, the thallus is distinctly shiny

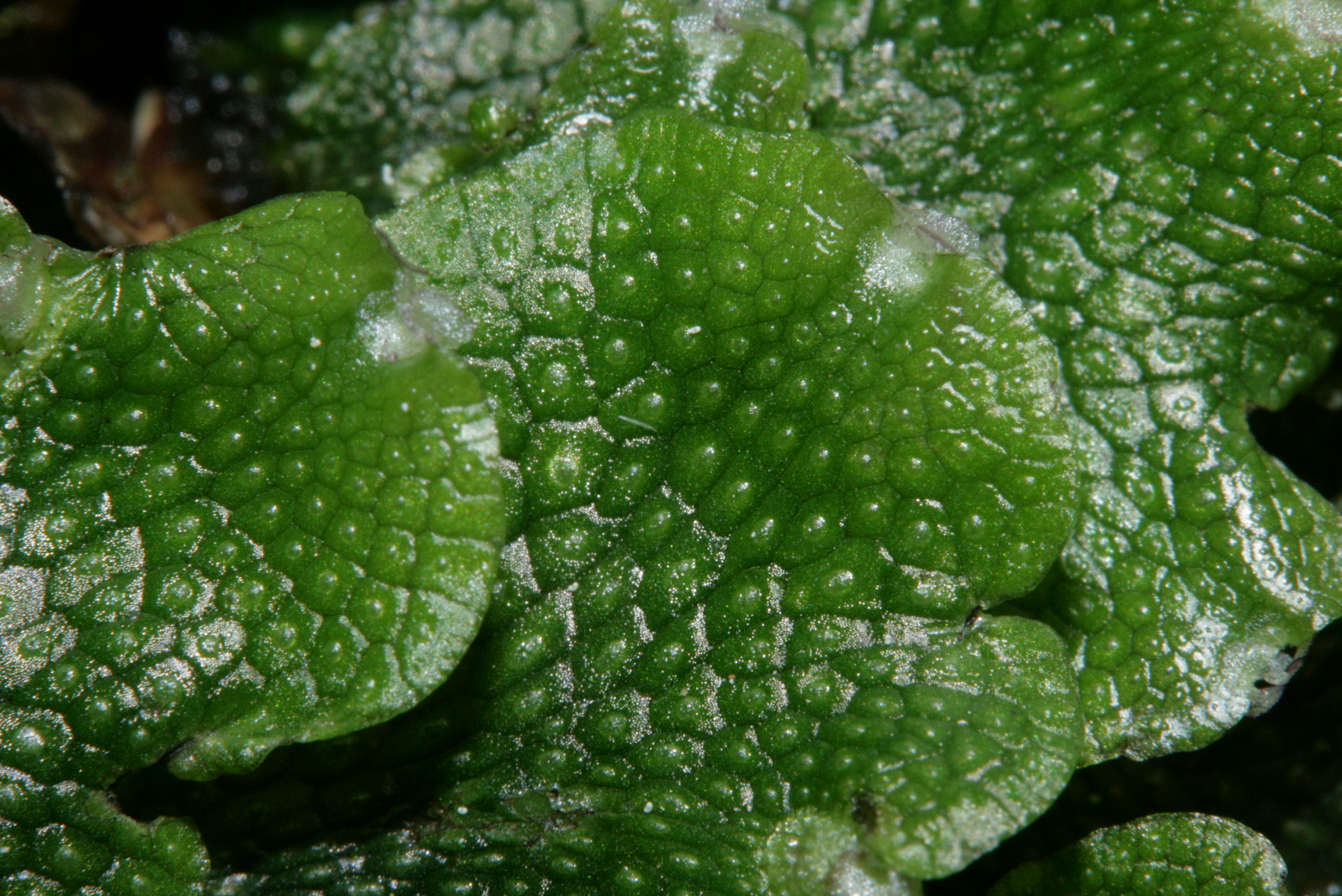
Conocephalum salebrosum, the thallus is dull in appearance

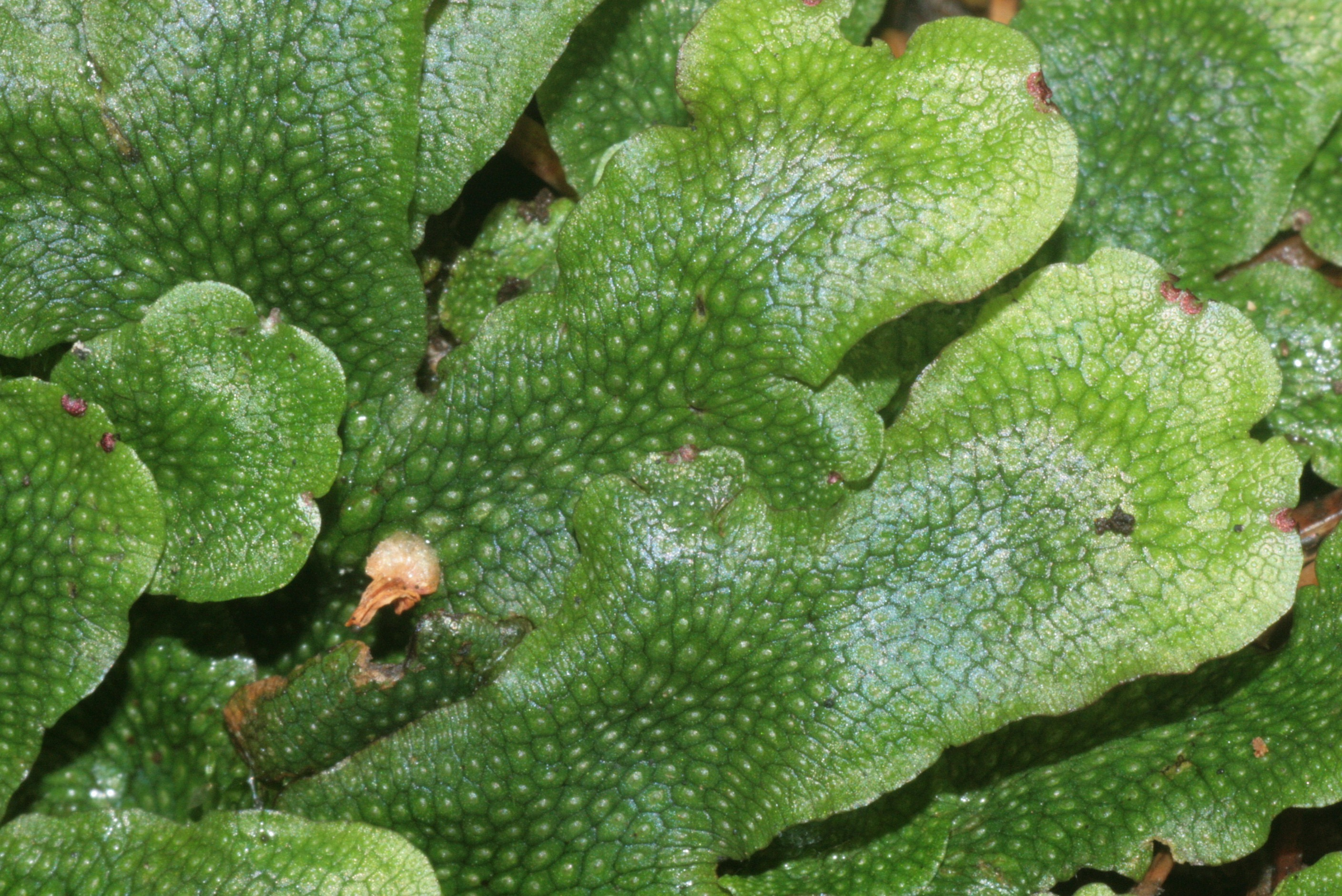
Conocephalum conicum, thallus

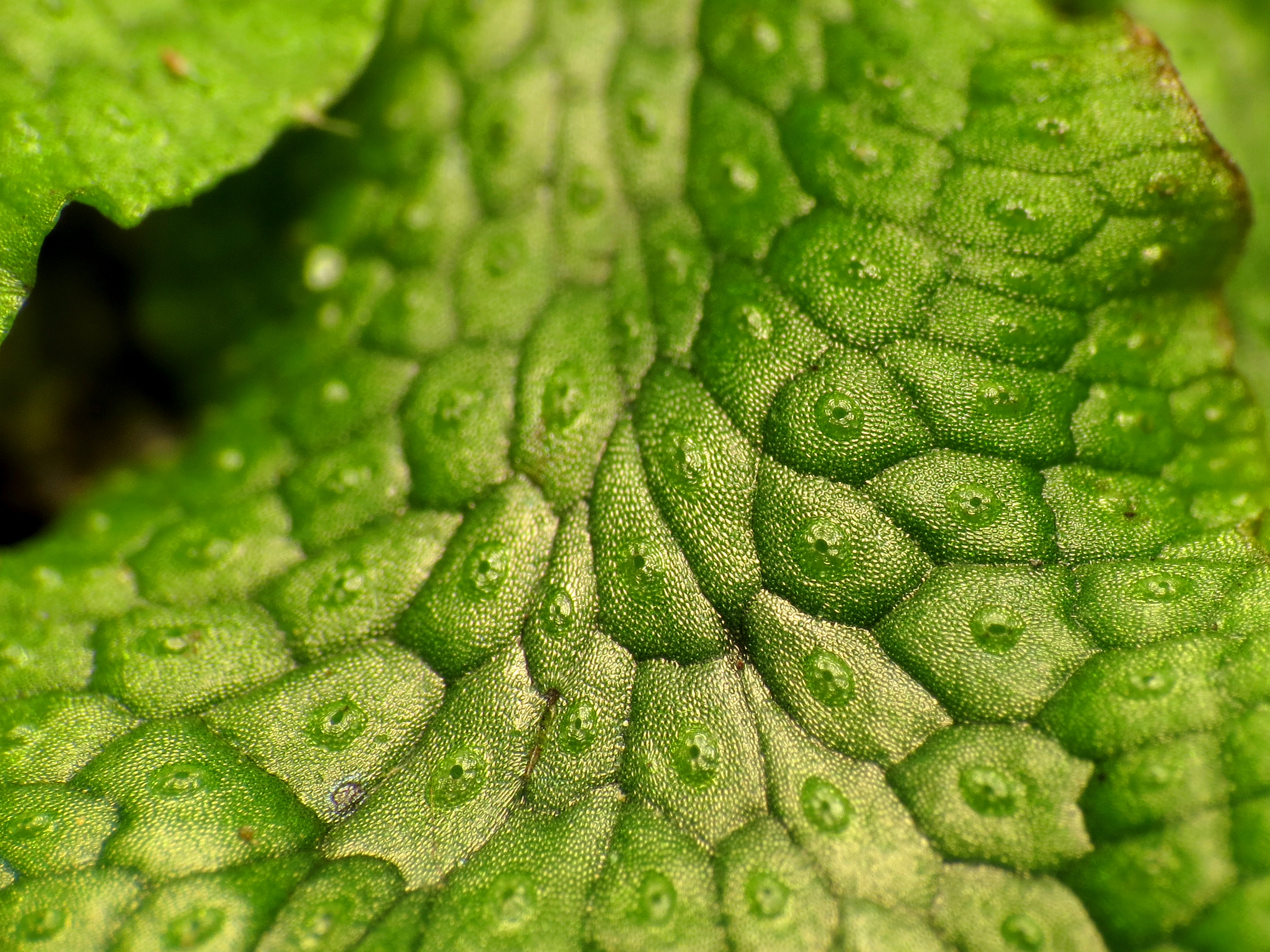
Conocephalum conicum, air pores visible on the upper surface of the thallus

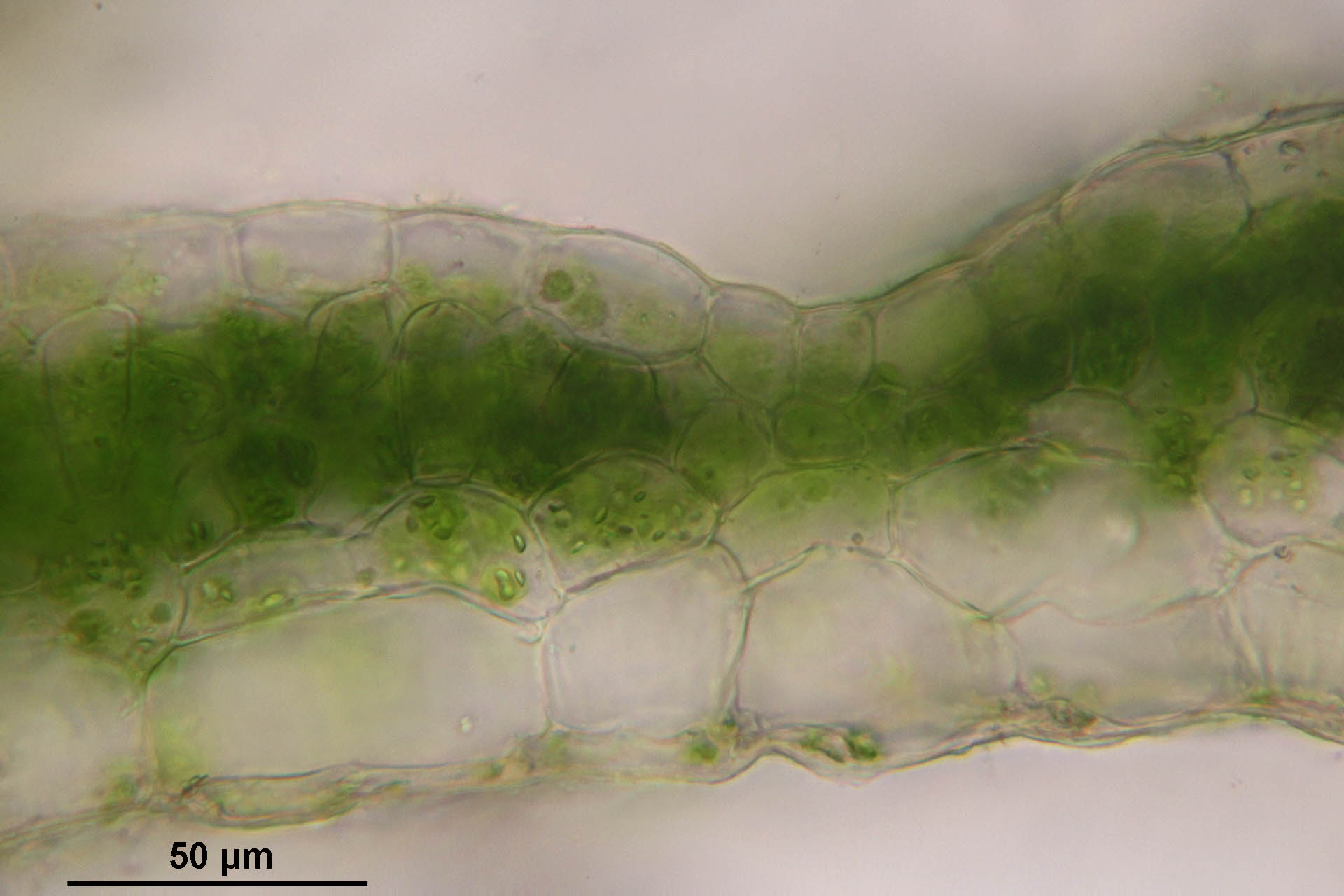
Conocephalum salebrosum, thallus cross section showing photosynthetic cells

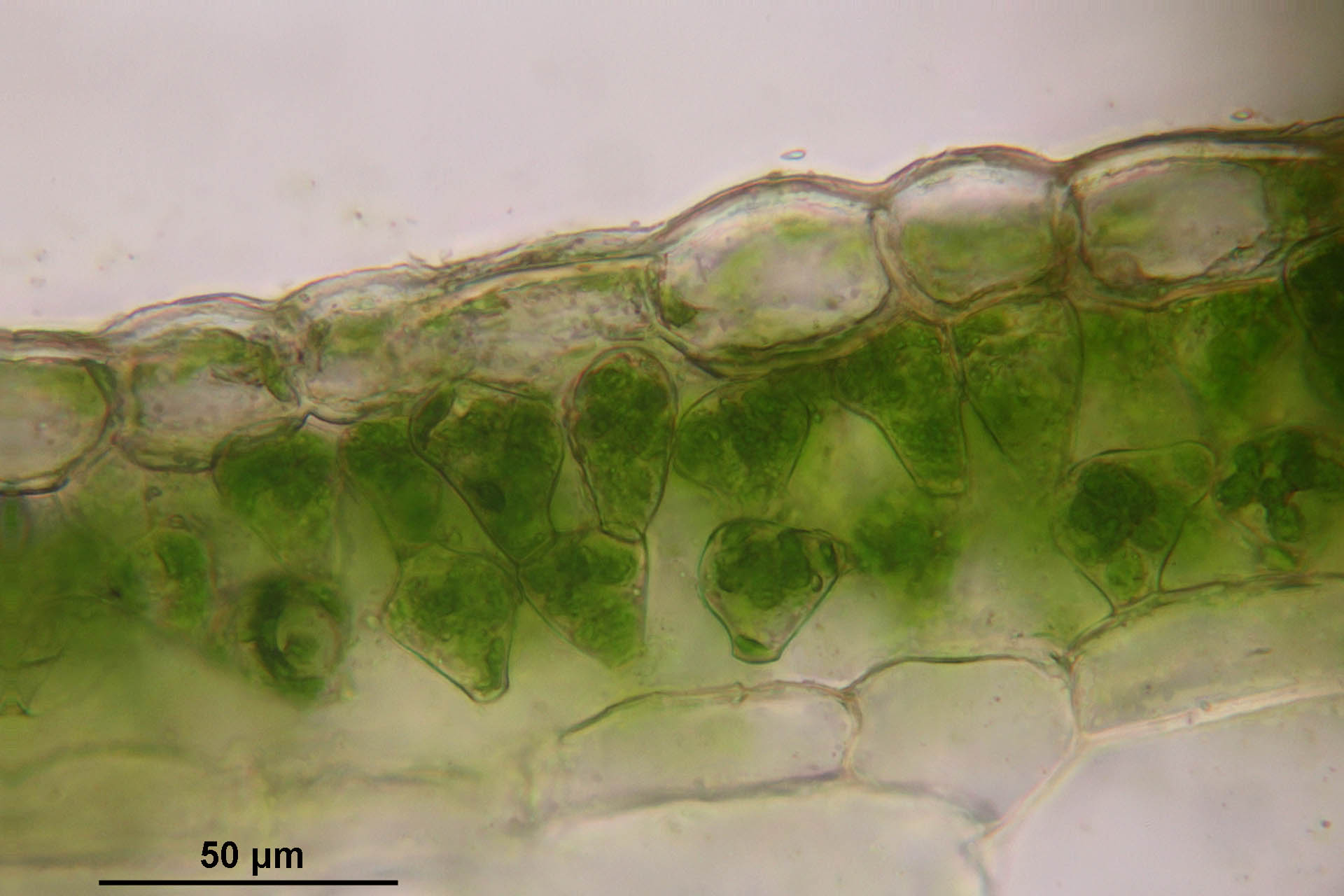
Conocephalum salebrosum, thallus cross section showing photosynthetic cells

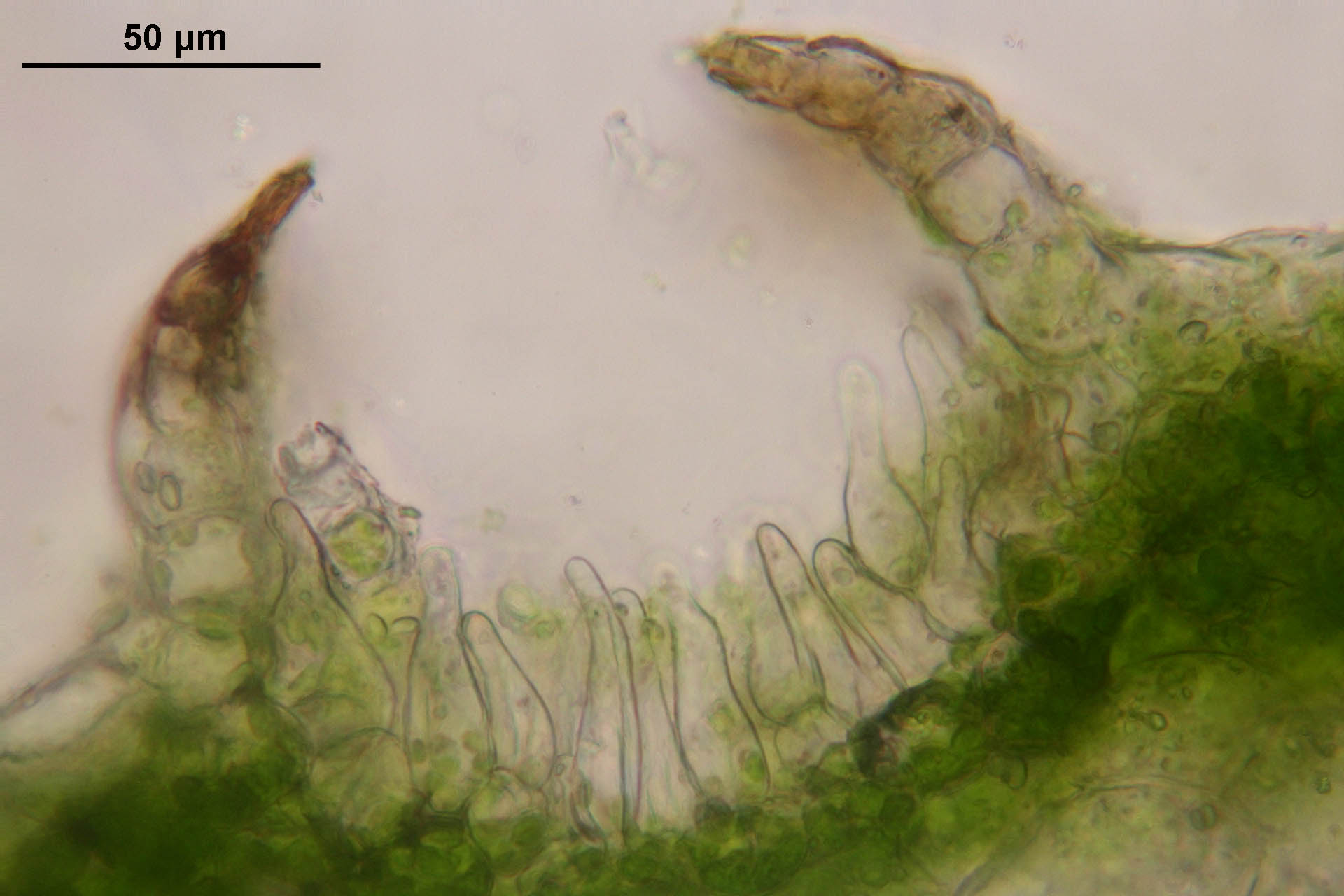
Conocephalum conicum, air pore present in the upper surface of the thallus

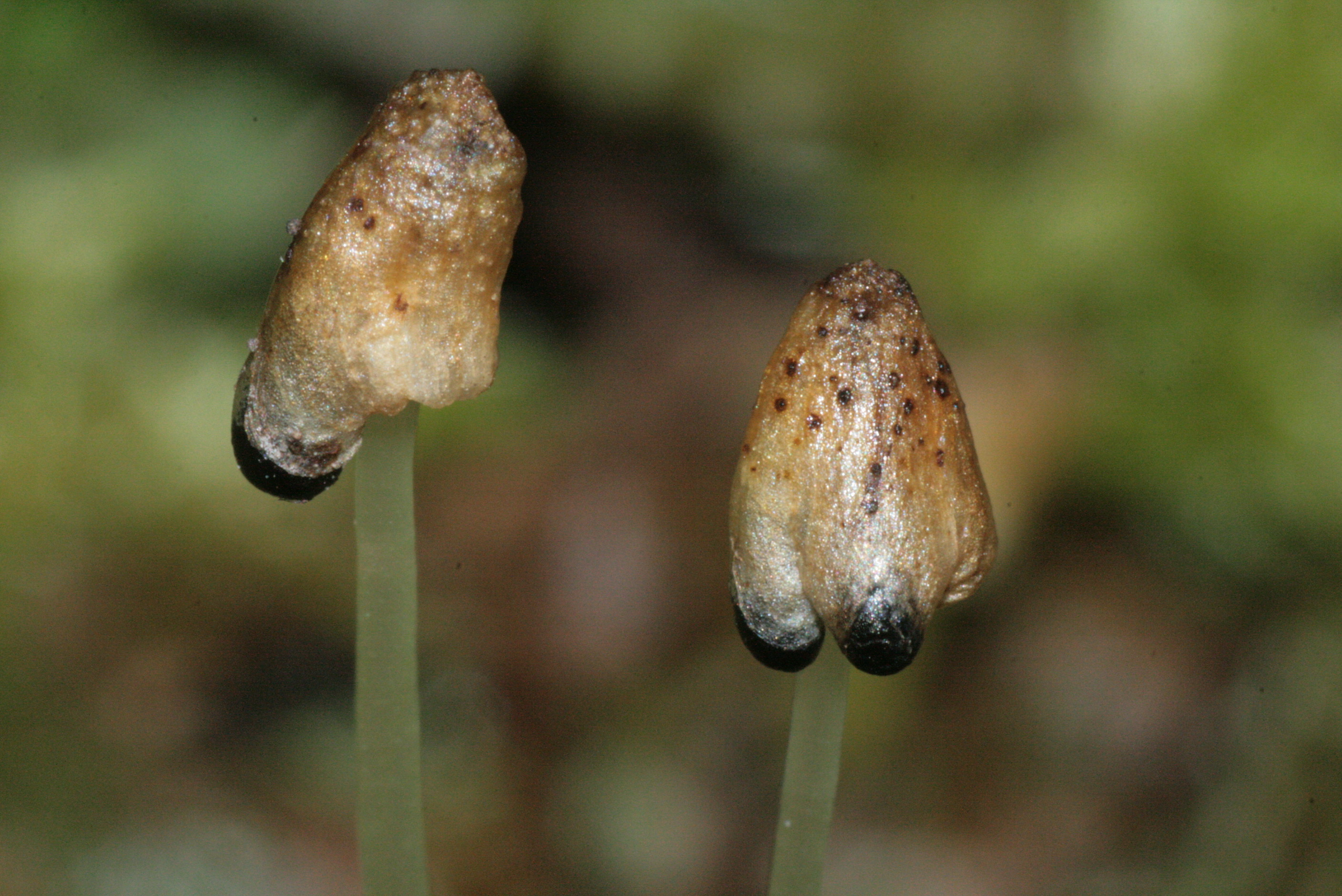
Conocephalum conicum, sporophytes (black) hanging beneath the umbrella-shaped, stalked archegoniophores

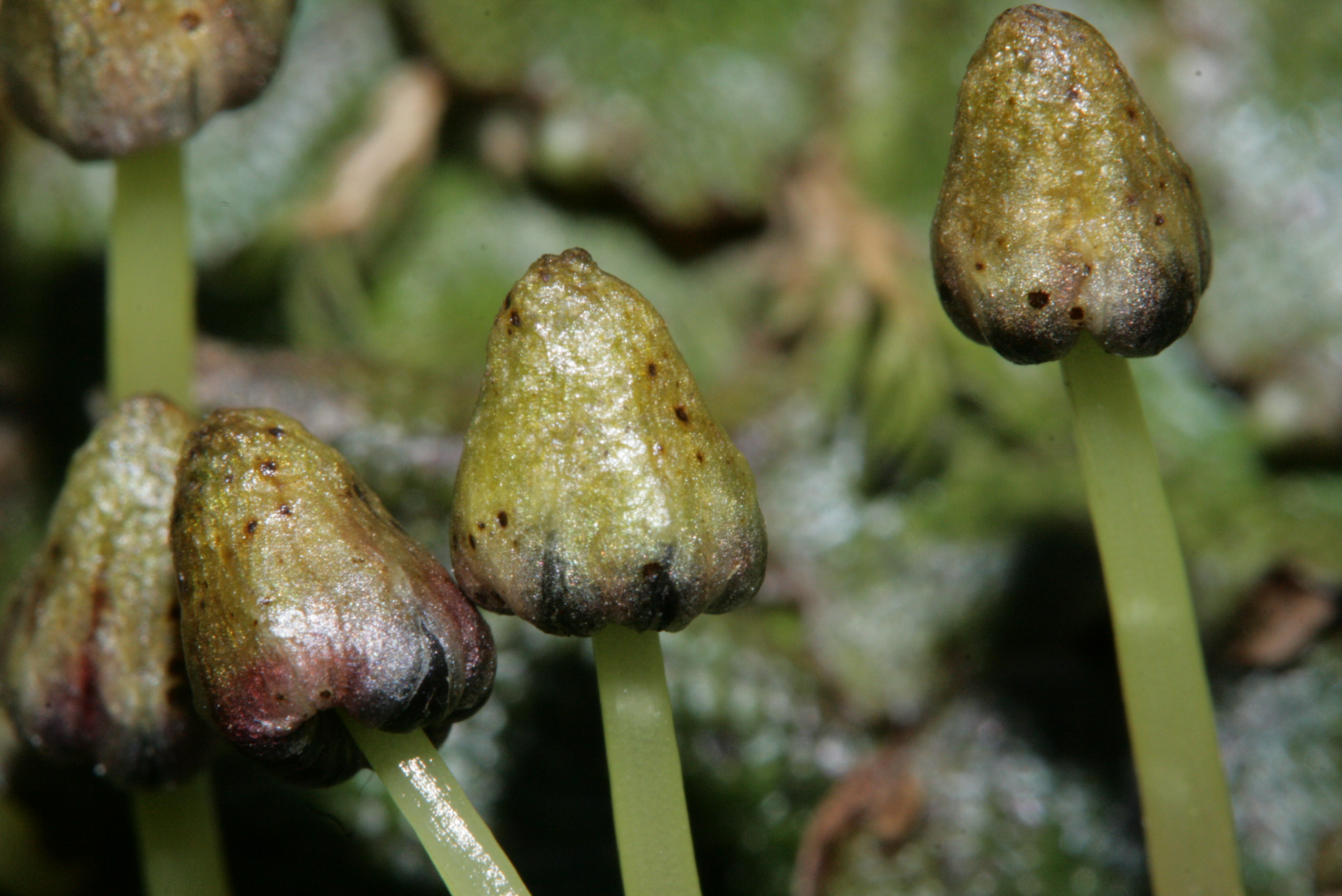
Conocephalum salebrosum, sporophytes (black) hanging beneath the umbrella-shaped, stalked archegoniophores

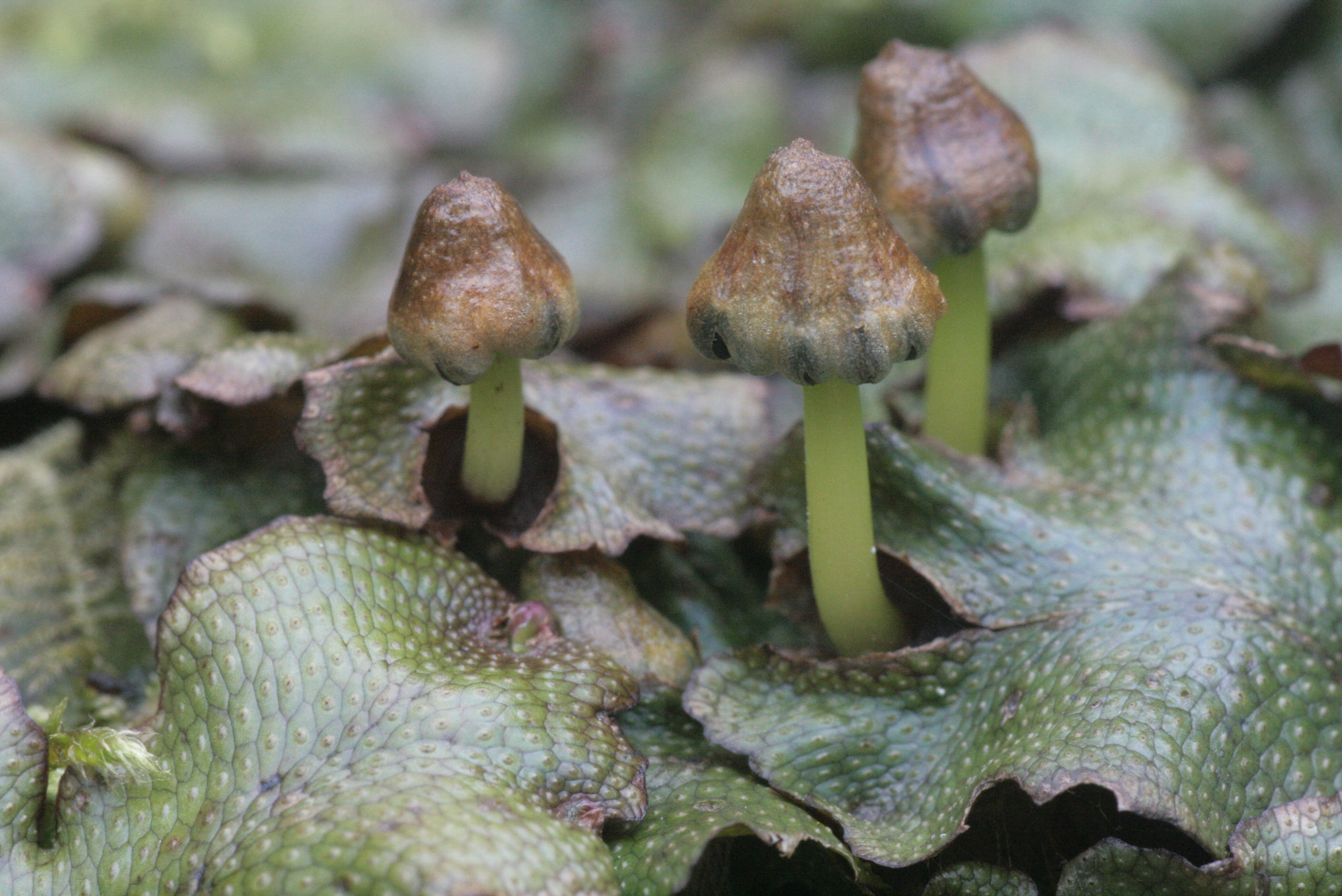
Conocephalum conicum, sporophytes (black) hanging beneath the archegoniophores

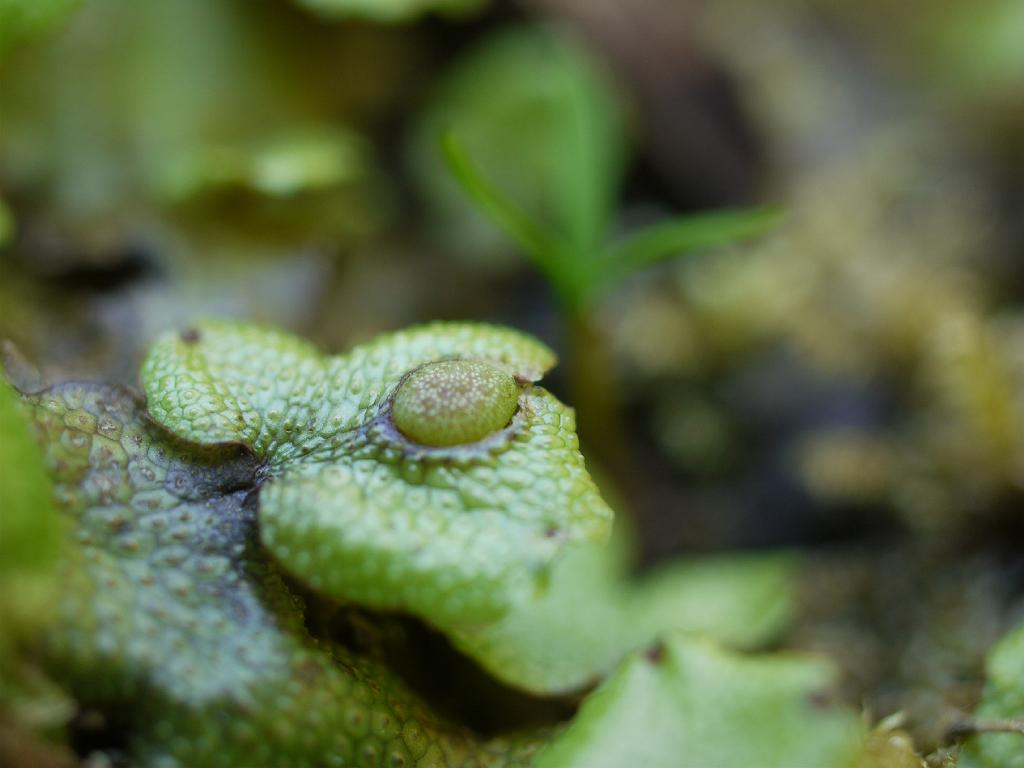
Conocephalum conicum, antheridium

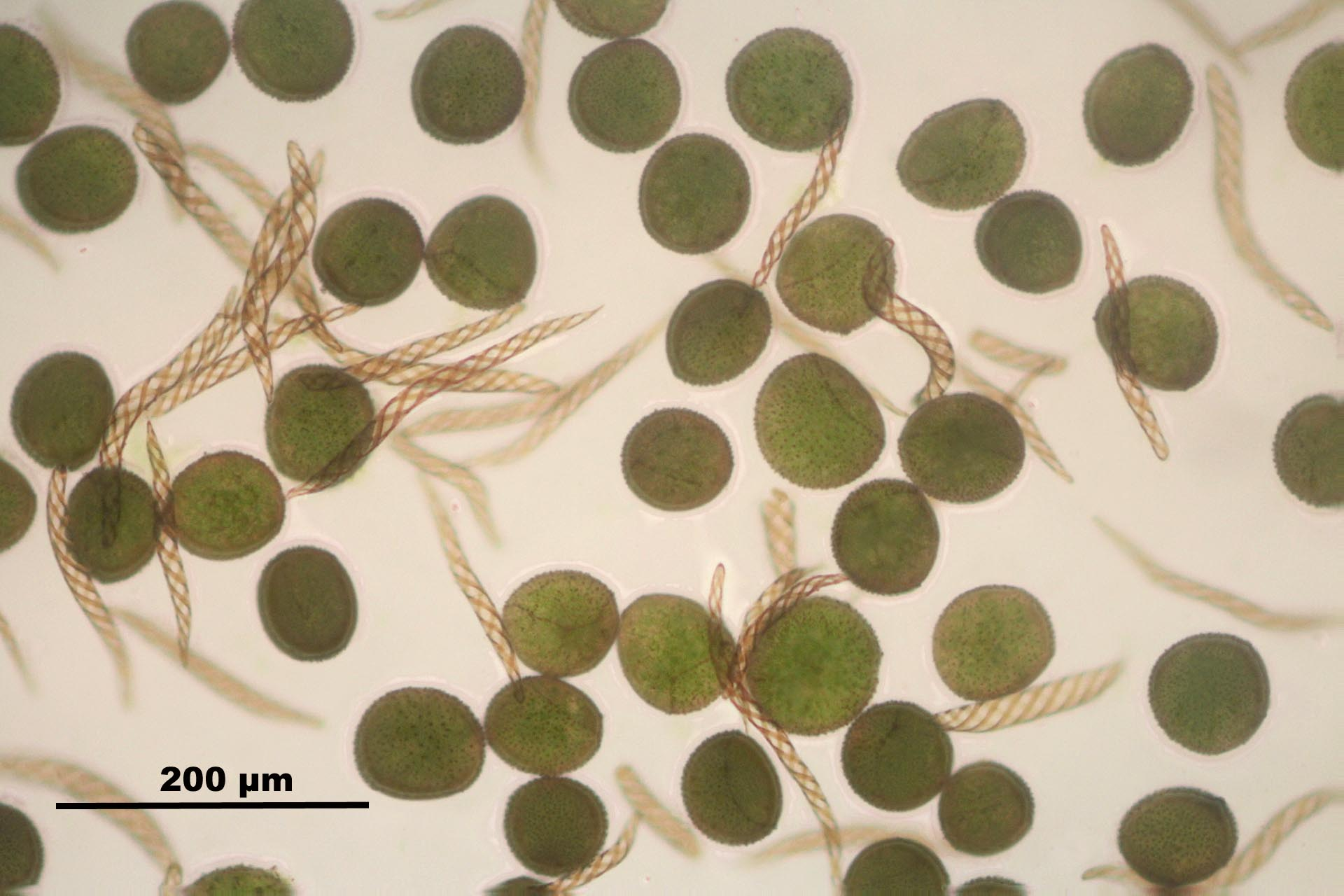
Conocephalum salebrosum, spores and elaters

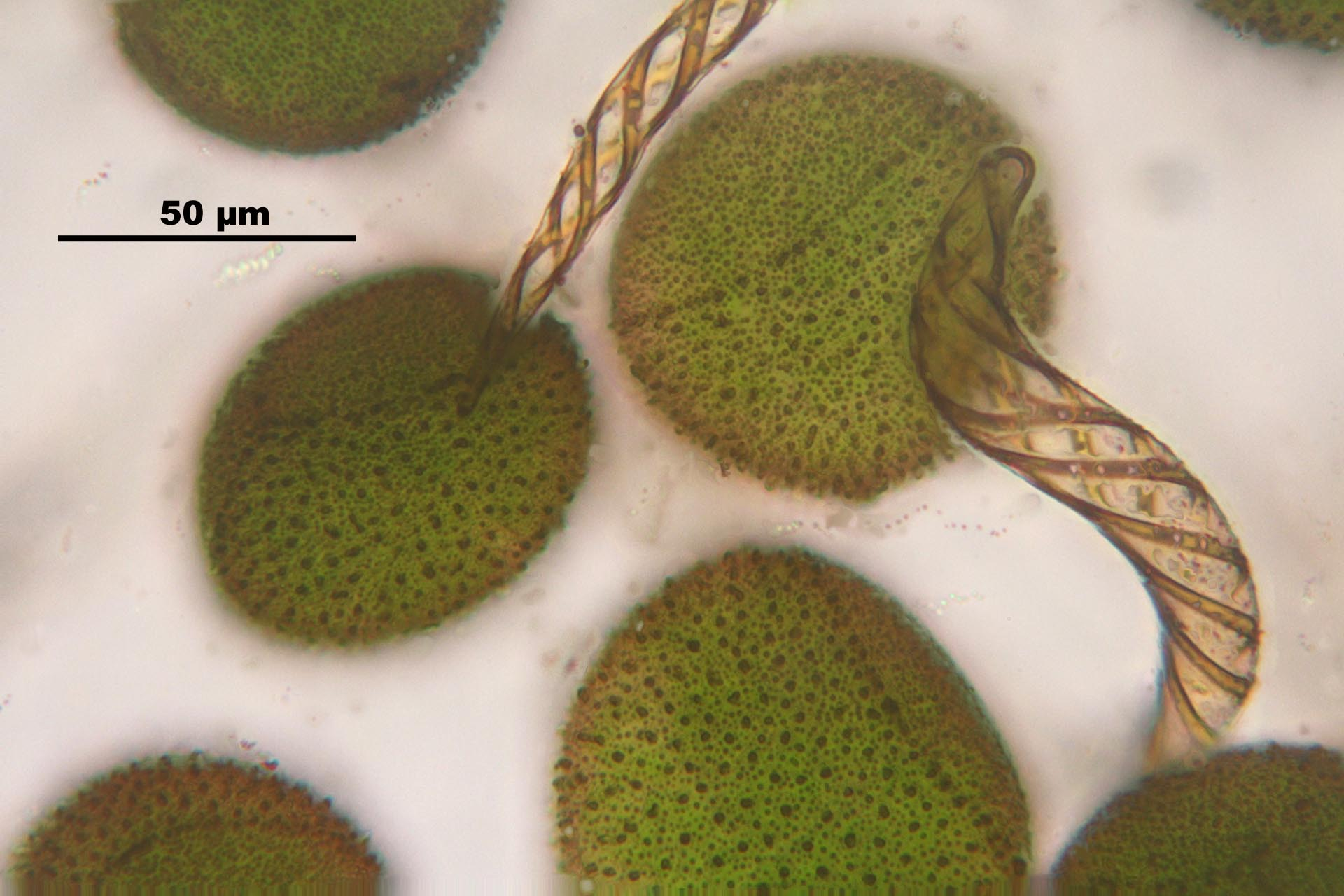
Conocephalum salebrosum, spores and elaters

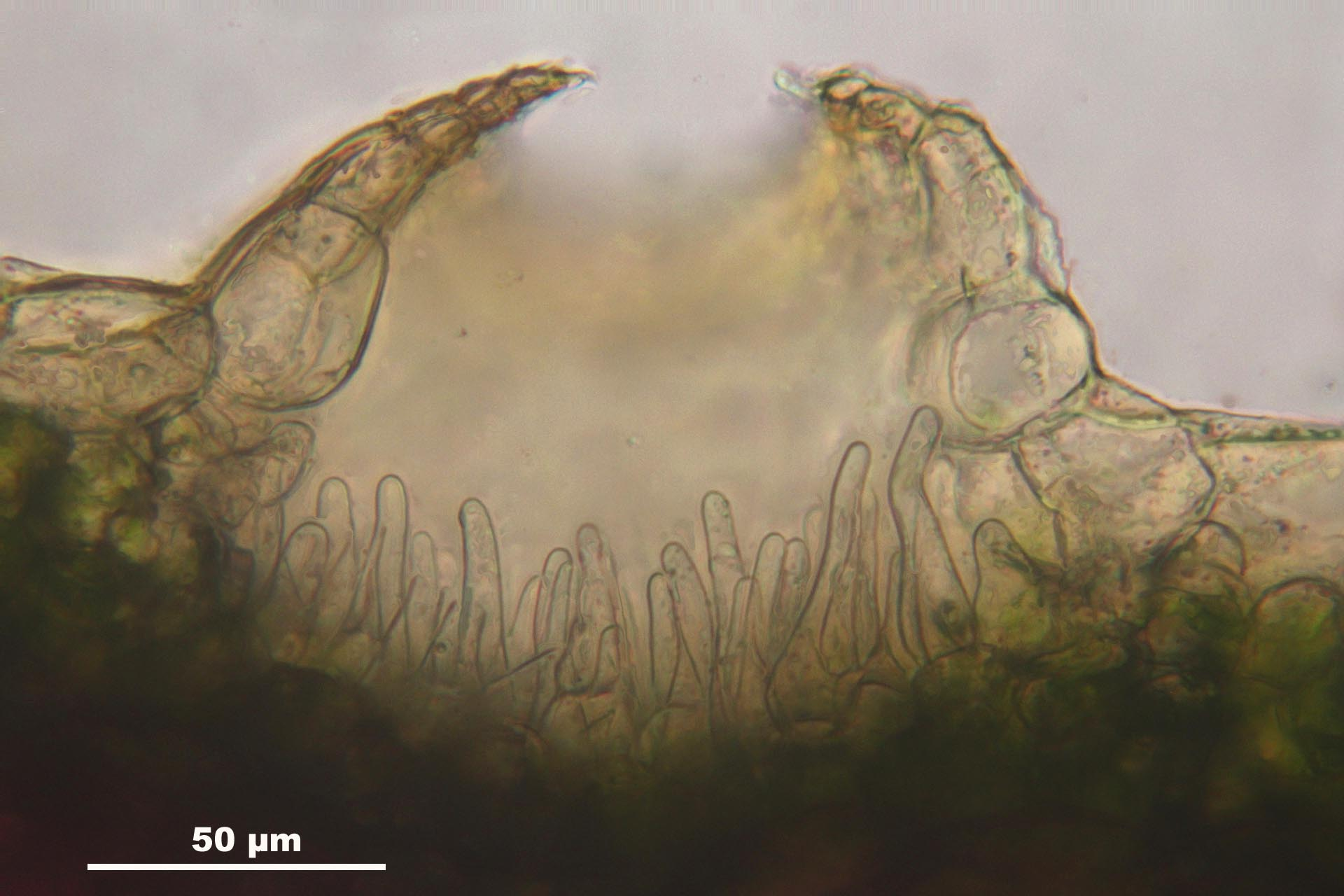
Conocephalum salebrosum, ir pore present in the upper surface of the thallus
