= MONA number =

Numbering system for North American moths

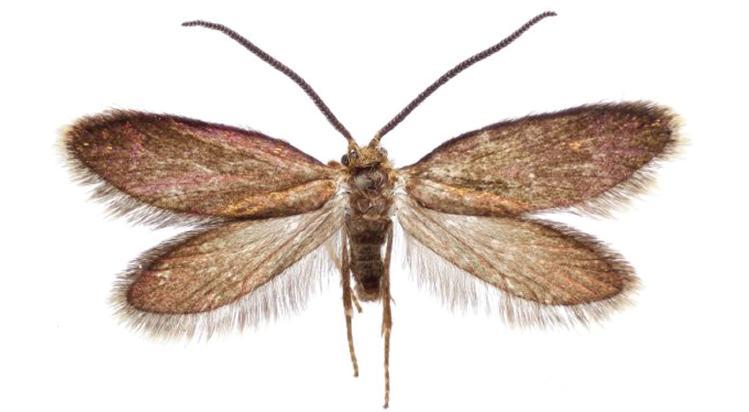
Epimartyria auricrinella: MONA number 0001

A MONA number (short for Moths of North America), or Hodges number after Ronald W. Hodges, is part of a numbering system for North American moths found north of Mexico in the Continental United States and Canada, as well as the island of Greenland. Introduced in 1983 by Hodges through the publication of Check List of the Lepidoptera of America North of Mexico, the system began an ongoing numeration process in order to compile a list of the over 12,000 moths of North America north of Mexico. The system numbers moths within the same family close together for identification purposes. For example, the species Epimartyria auricrinella begins the numbering system at 0001 while Epimartyria pardella is numbered 0002.

The system has become somewhat out of date since its inception for several reasons:

1. Some numbers no longer exist as the species bearing the number have been reclassified into other species.
2. Some species have been regrouped into a different family and their MONA numbers are out of order taxonomically.
3. New species have been discovered since the implementation of the MONA system, resulting in the usage of decimal numbers as to not disrupt the numbering of other species.

Despite the issues above, the MONA system has remained popular with many websites and publications. It is the most popular numbering system used, largely replacing the older McDunnough Numbers system, while some published lists prefer to use other forms of compilation. The Moth Photographer's Group (MPG) at Mississippi State University actively monitors the expansive list of North American moths utilizing the MONA system and updates their checklists in accordance with publishings regarding changes and additions.
