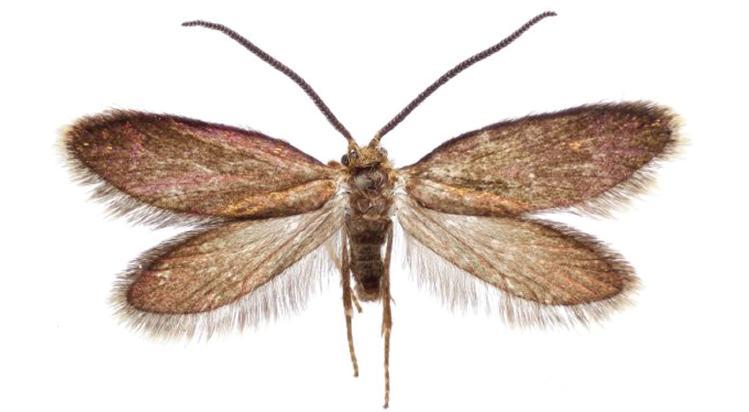
- Epimartyria auricrinella

Scientific classification
- Domain: Eukaryota
- Kingdom: Animalia
- Phylum: Arthropoda
- Class: Insecta
- Order: Lepidoptera
- Family: Micropterigidae
- Genus: Epimartyria; Walsingham, 1898

Species
- see text.

= Epimartyria =

Genus of moths in family Micropterigidae

Epimartyria is a genus of small primitive metallic moths in the family Micropterigidae.

== Species ==
- Epimartyria auricrinella Walsingham, 1898
- Epimartyria bimaculella Davis & Landry, 2012
- Epimartyria pardella (Walsingham, 1880)
