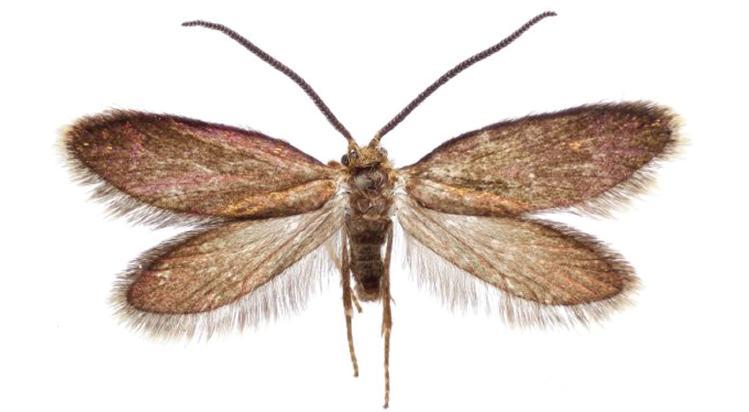

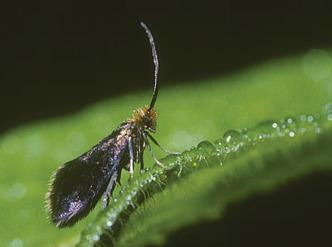

Scientific classification
- Domain: Eukaryota
- Kingdom: Animalia
- Phylum: Arthropoda
- Class: Insecta
- Order: Lepidoptera
- Family: Micropterigidae
- Genus: Epimartyria
- Species: E. auricrinella

Binomial name
- Epimartyria auricrinella Walsingham, 1898

= Epimartyria auricrinella =

Moth species in family Micropterigidae

Epimartyria auricrinella (goldcap moss-eater moth) is a species of moth belonging to the family Micropterigidae. It was described by Lord Walsingham. It is known from the eastern parts of the United States (from Maine to Michigan and south to Tennessee and Georgia) as well as south-eastern Canada (from Nova Scotia to Ontario). Its MONA number is 0001.

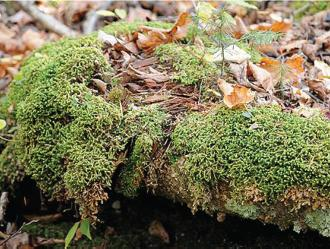
Bazzania trilobata, the host plant

The species occurs in shaded locations, in wet swampy woods, boggy ditches, or creek sides where leafy (moss-like) liverworts grow.

The length of the forewings is 4.2–5.6 mm. Adults are easily distinguished from those of the other members of the genus Epimartyria in possessing uniformly dark fuscous forewings without the yellowish spots present in those species. Adults are diurnal. They can be seen perched on low foliage during the day and can be active even in early morning after sunrise. Mating takes place in the afternoon.

The larvae feed on the leafy, moss-like species of liverwort, including Bazzania trilobata. Full-grown larvae reach a length of 5 mm. They are generally brown in color, but lighter brown ventrally. They possess a plastron which indicates the capacity to live for short periods in a subaquatic environment or, at least in a habitat that is water-saturated. Larval development probably spans over two years.
