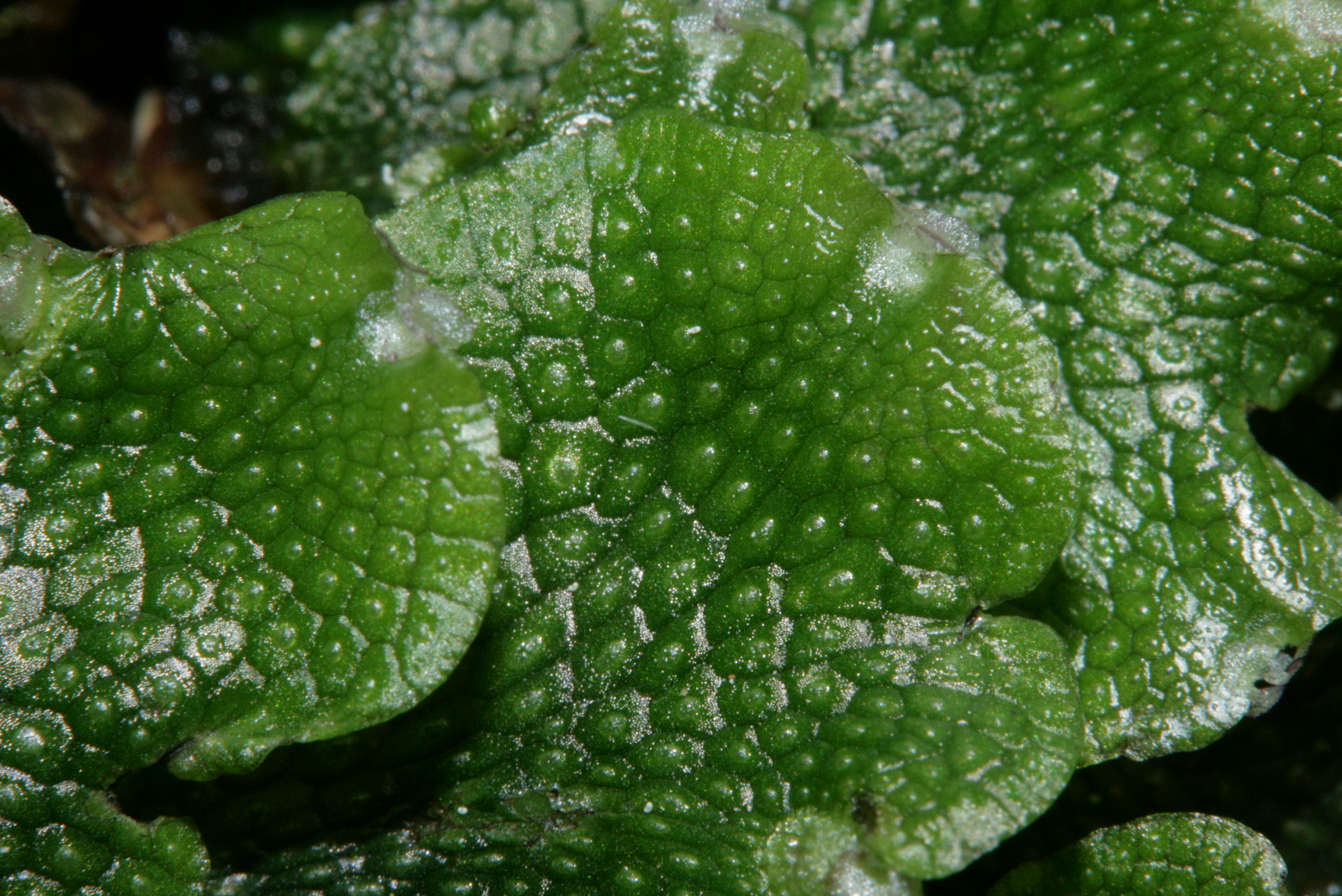

Scientific classification
- Kingdom: Plantae
- Division: Marchantiophyta
- Class: Marchantiopsida
- Order: Marchantiales
- Family: Conocephalaceae
- Genus: Conocephalum
- Species: C. salebrosum

Binomial name
- Conocephalum salebrosum Szweyk., Buczkowska & Odrzykoski

= Conocephalum salebrosum =

Species of liverwort

Conocephalum salebrosum, commonly known as snakewort, is a species of liverwort, a non-vascular land plant, with a broad, holarctic distribution. It is also known as snakeskin liverwort, cat-tongue liverwort, mushroom-headed liverwort, and great scented liverwort.

Species of Conocephalum are arranged into the Conocephalum conicum complex, which includes several cryptic species.

C. salebrosum grows in shaded to part-shade habitats in wet or moist conditions, often on rock surfaces or thin soil.

== Distribution and habitat ==
C. salebrosum is commonly found throughout North America and occurs in moist, shaded and calcareous habitats. In contrast to Conocephalum conicum, C. salebrosum is more tolerant to desiccation and can grow in areas with less shade.
