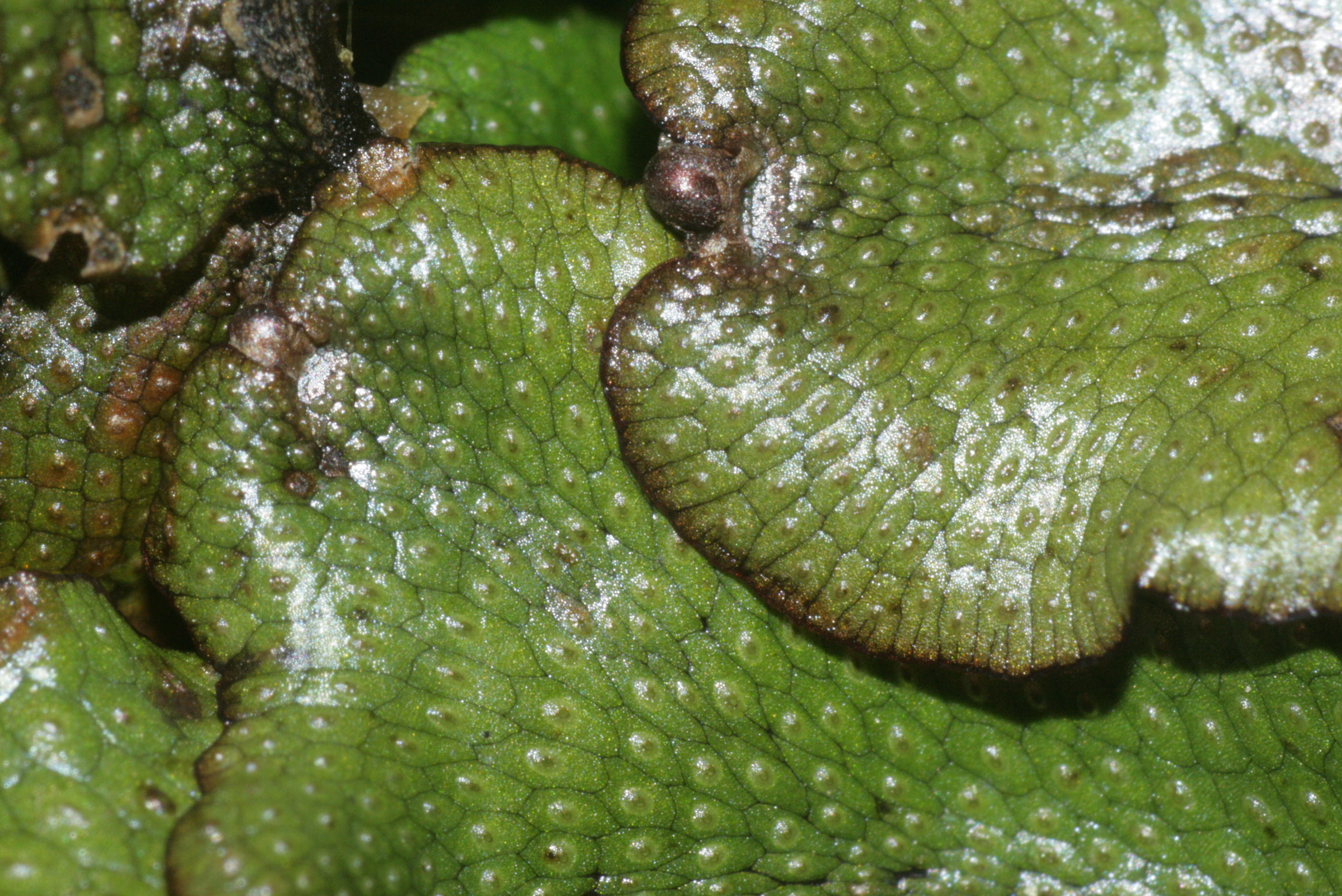
- Conocephalum conicum

Scientific classification
- Kingdom: Plantae
- Division: Marchantiophyta
- Class: Marchantiopsida
- Order: Marchantiales
- Family: Conocephalaceae
- Genus: Conocephalum
- Species: C. conicum

Binomial name
- Conocephalum conicum (L.) Dum.

= Conocephalum conicum =

Species of liverwort

Conocephalum conicum, also known as the great scented liverwort or snakeskin liverwort, is a liverwort species in the genus Conocephalum. C. conicum is part of the Conocephalum conicum complex, which includes several cryptic species. The name C. conicum refers to the cone-shaped archegoniophore, which bear sporangia.

== Habitat and distribution ==
C. conicum is one of the most common liverworts in northern hemisphere and is widely distributed throughout Canada.

C. conicum is found in open woodlands, sandy banks, wet rocks or cliffs and moist soils and is strongly associated with calcareous substrates.

== Morphology ==
=== Thalli ===
C. conicum is the largest of the thalloid liverworts, growing up to 20 cm long.

The thalli can grow to 17 mm wide. The thalli are very strong-smelling, with purplish margins; a dark green, leathery surface; flat and smooth. There is a set of lines running along the thalli's surface. The air pores, which are found between the lines, are more conspicuous. trans-Methyl cinnamate is a major doriferous component from two populations of this liverwort, but has not been identified from other populations.

=== Reproductive structures ===
Male plants bear unstalked, terminal cushions. Female plants have terminal conical receptacles on stalks, which are shortly lobed.

== Relationships with fungi ==
C. conicum has been associated with some species of fungi. These fungi form a highly branched mycelium outside of the plant which then colonize the outside of the rhizoids and pass into the gametophyte.
