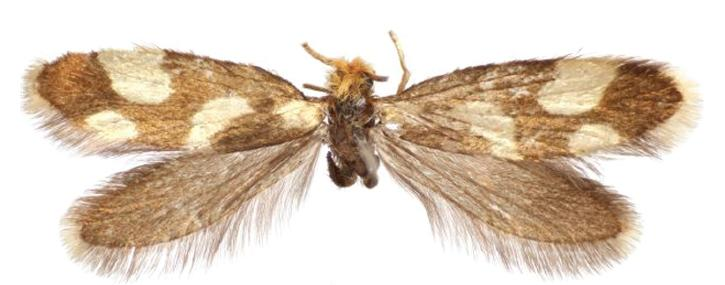

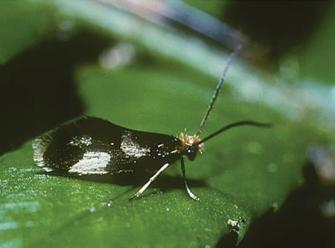

Scientific classification
- Domain: Eukaryota
- Kingdom: Animalia
- Phylum: Arthropoda
- Class: Insecta
- Order: Lepidoptera
- Family: Micropterigidae
- Genus: Epimartyria
- Species: E. pardella

Binomial name
- Epimartyria pardella Walsingham, 1880

Synonyms
- Micropteryx pardella Walsingham, 1880

= Epimartyria pardella =

Moth species in family Micropterigidae

Epimartyria pardella is a species of moth belonging to the Micropterigidae family. It was described by Walsingham, Lord Thomas de Grey, in 1880. Its wingspan is 10–11 mm with a metallic brown forewing featuring three distinctive yellow spots. Adults are on wing from early May to mid July and are diurnal. The larvae feed on liverworts, including Conocephalum conicum and Pellia species and take about two years to fully develop.

The species is found in southern Oregon and north-western California.
