= C15H10O7 =

The molecular formula C_{15}H_{10}O_{7} (molar mass: 302.23 g/mol, exact mass :302.042653 u) may refer to:

- Pentahydroxyflavone
  - Herbacetin, a flavonol
  - Hypolaetin, a flavone
  - Morin (molecule), a flavonol
  - Quercetin, a flavonol
  - Robinetin
  - Tricetin, a flavone
