= S. leucantha =

S. leucantha may refer to:

- Salvia leucantha, the Mexican bush sage, a herbaceous perennial plant species native to Mexico
- Sideritis leucantha, a plant species
