= Sideritis elica =

Scientific classification
- Kingdom: Plantae
- Clade: Tracheophytes
- Clade: Angiosperms
- Clade: Eudicots
- Clade: Asterids
- Order: Lamiales
- Family: Lamiaceae
- Genus: Sideritis
- Species: S. elica

Binomial name
- Sideritis elica Aneva, Zhelev and Bonchev

Species of flowering plant

Sideritis elica is a plant species in the genus Sideritis, endemic to Bulgaria. The species was discovered and described by Associate Prof. Ina Aneva and Senior Assistant Prof. Georgi Bonchev of the Bulgarian Academy of Sciences, as well as by Prof. Petar Zhelev of the University of Forestry in Sofia.

The molecular analysis supports the morphological data about the divergence between the more widespread Sideritis scardica and Sideritis elica. The studied populations of the two taxa were found to be genetically distant.

The species is only known from the northern foothills of the central Rhodope Mountains, where it grows in the Chervenata Stena Reserve near Asenovgrad and Bachkovo Monastery.
