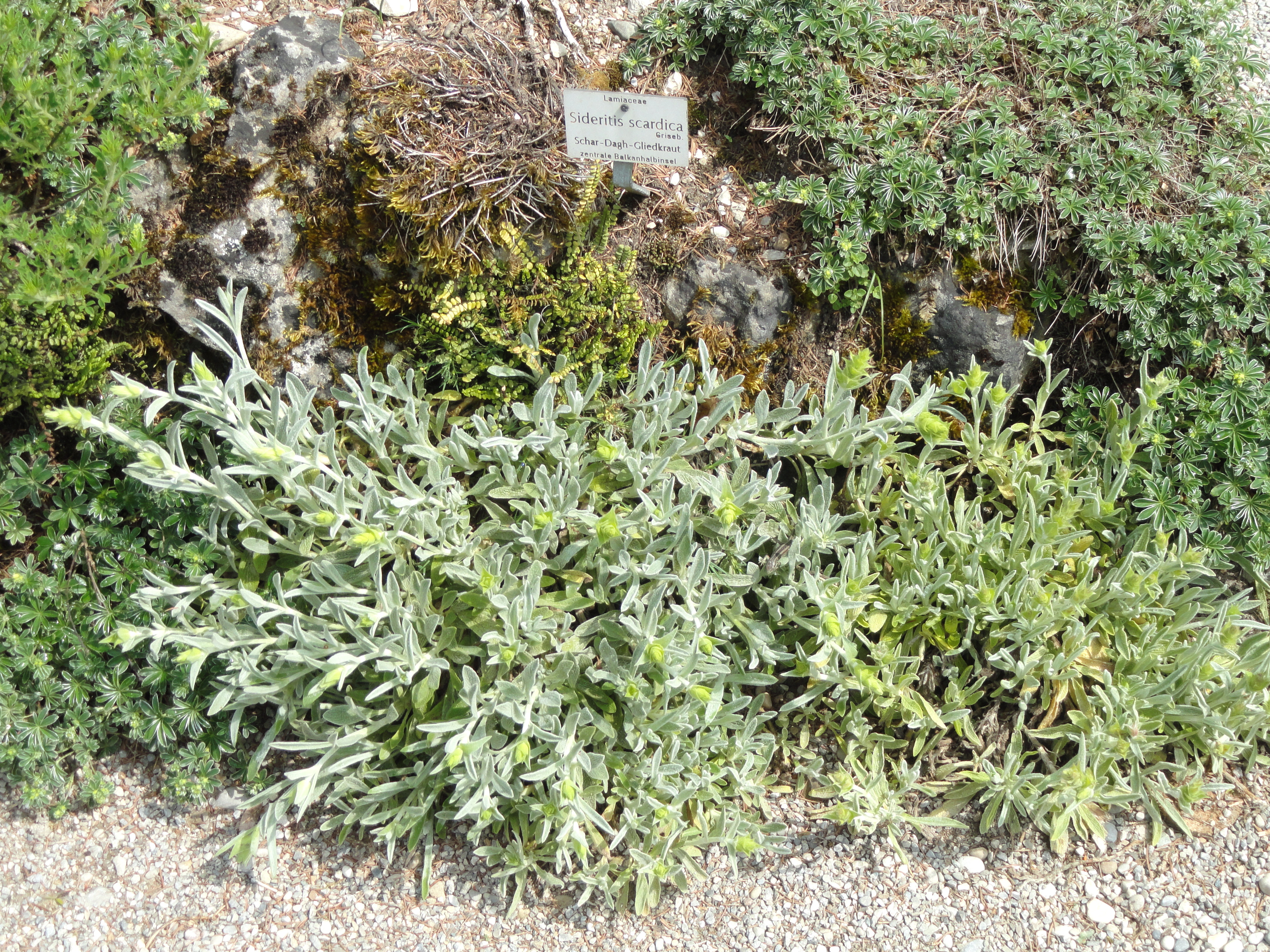

Scientific classification
- Kingdom: Plantae
- Clade: Tracheophytes
- Clade: Angiosperms
- Clade: Eudicots
- Clade: Asterids
- Order: Lamiales
- Family: Lamiaceae
- Genus: Sideritis
- Species: S. pusilla

Binomial name
- Sideritis pusilla Griseb.

Synonyms
- Navicularia scardica (Griseb.) Soják; Sideritis florida Boiss. & Heldr.; Sideritis raeseri subsp. florida (Boiss. & Heldr.) Papan. & Kokkini; Sideritis scardica subsp. longibracteata Papan. & Kokkini

= Sideritis pusilla =

Species of flowering plant

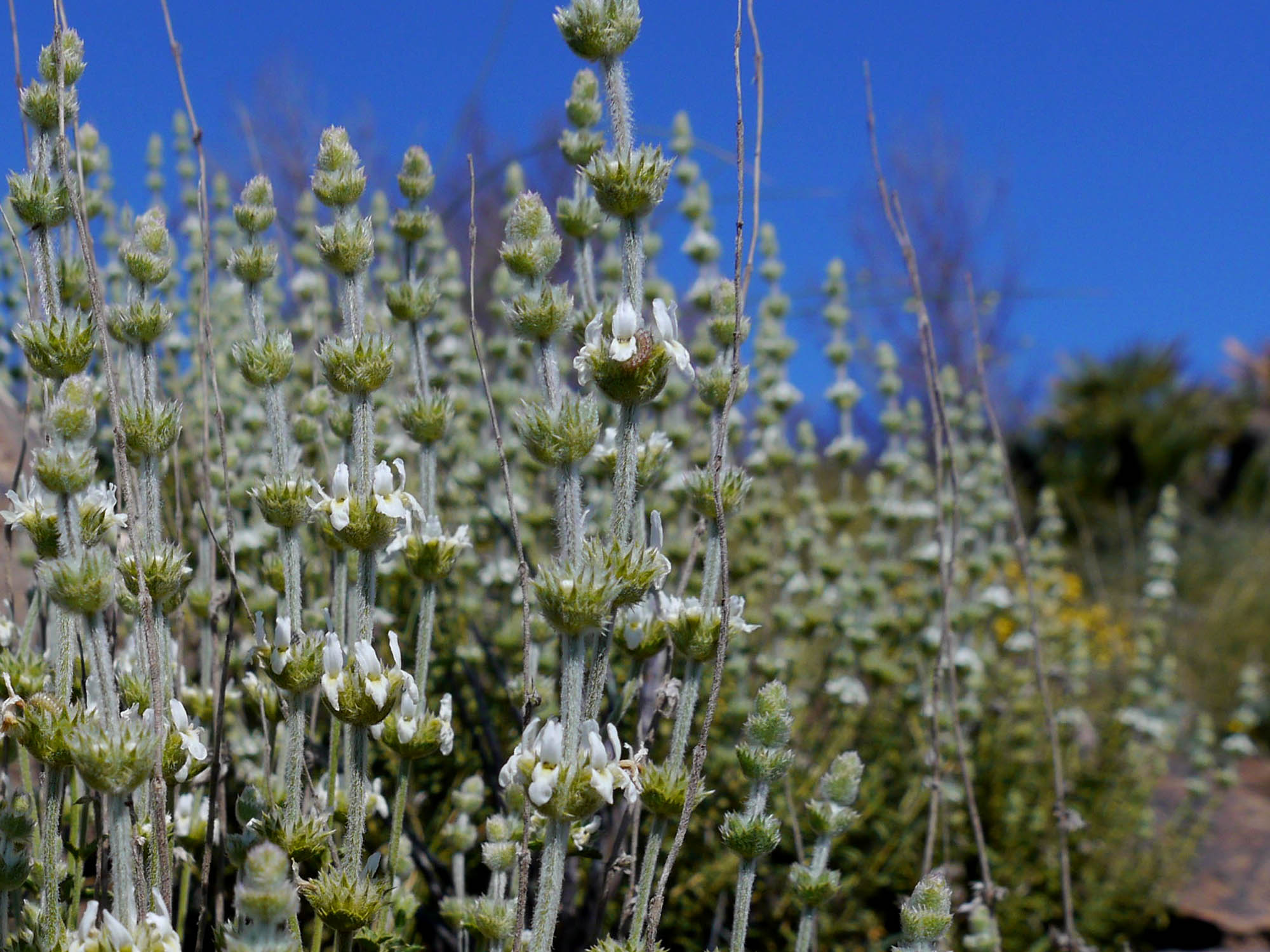
Sideritis pusilla in the Peña del Águila (Cartagena).

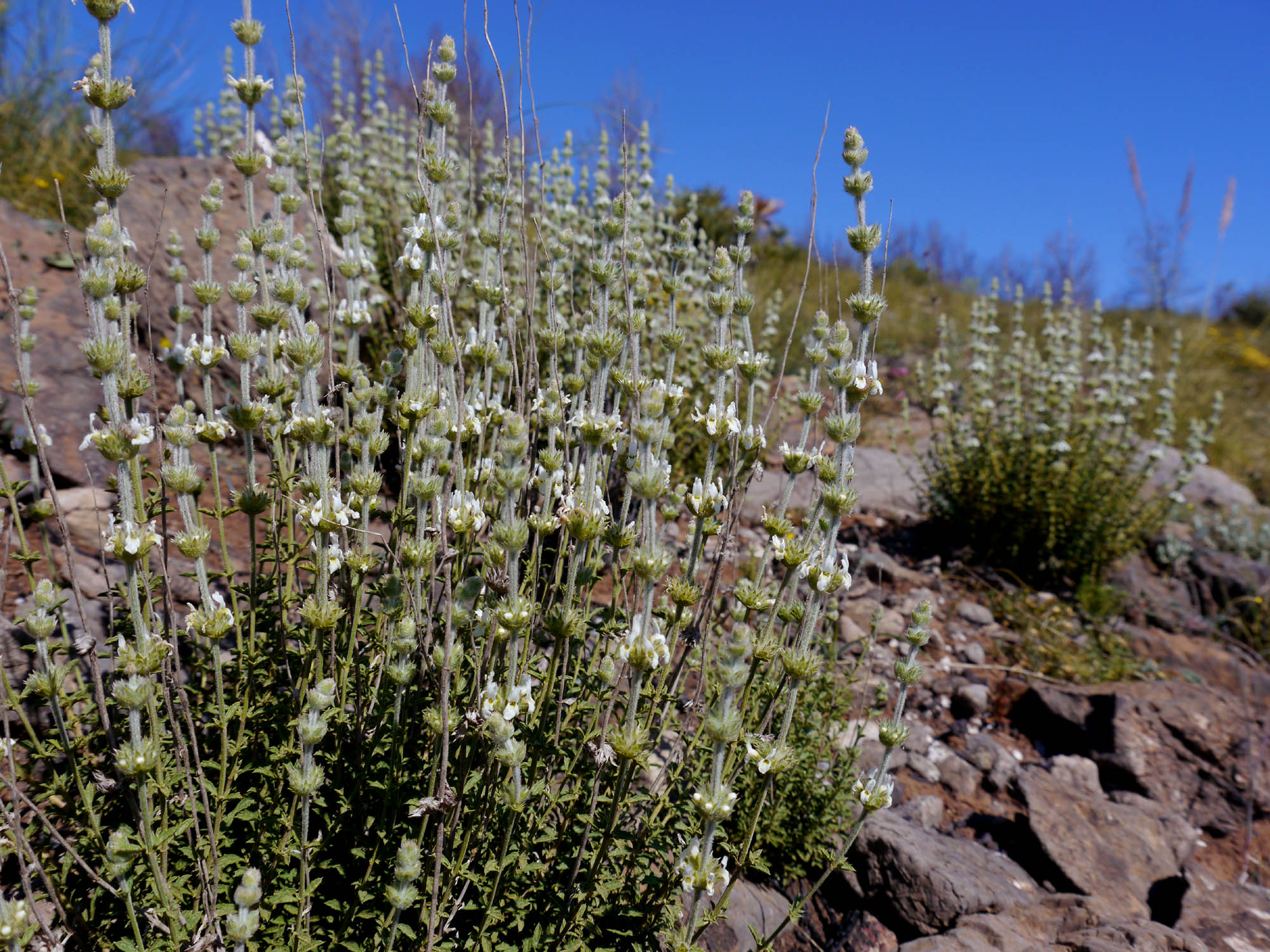
View of the plant.

Sideritis pusilla is a species of flowering plant belonging to the family Lamiaceae.

== Description ==
It is a subshrub that reaches a height of 17-42 cm, without stolons. The stems are brown or greenish, hairy on all sides. Leaves measure 8-17 × 3-5 mm, lanceolate or elliptical, with a mucronate apex and 1-3 broad teeth on each side. The inflorescence measures 5-35 × 1-1.5 cm, formed by 3-11 whorls each containing 6 non-globose flowers. Bracts are 5-10 × 8-10 mm, broadly ovate. The corolla is 8-9 mm, uniform in color, cream-colored, sometimes white. The nutlets (fruits) measure 2 × 1.5-1.7 mm, subtrigonous, ± smooth, shiny, and dark brown. 2n = 22, 26; n = 11, 13.

== Distribution and habitat ==
This Lamiaceae species has an Iberian-African distribution and inhabits thyme-covered areas and scrubland on calcareous, marly, or gypsum substrates.

Sideritis pusilla can be found in Spain, specifically in the provinces of Alicante, Almería, Granada, Córdoba, Málaga, and the Region of Murcia.

== Taxonomy ==
Sideritis pusilla was described by (Lange) Pau and published in Species Plantarum 2: 574. 1753.

=== Cytology ===
The chromosome number of Sideritis pusilla (Fam. Labiatae) and its infraspecific taxa is 2n = 22, 22 + 7B.

=== Etymology ===
- Sideritis: The generic name derives from the Greek "sideritis," which can be literally translated as "the one that is or has iron." The plant was known to the ancient Greeks, specifically Dioscorides and Theophrastus. Although Dioscorides describes three species, only one (probably S. scordioides) is believed to refer to sideritis. In antiquity, sideritis was a generic reference for plants capable of healing wounds caused by iron weapons in battles. However, others argue that the name derives from the shape of the sepal, which resembles the tip of a spear.
- pusilla: A Latin epithet meaning "very small."

=== Subspecies ===
Flora Ibérica recognizes three subspecies in Spain and one more in North Africa.

For Spain, the subspecies are:

- Sideritis pusilla subsp. pusilla
- Sideritis pusilla subsp. granatensis
- Sideritis pusilla subsp. alhamillensis

=== Synonymy ===
The publication Flora Ibérica does not recognize the taxa Sideritis marminorensis or Sideritis pusilla subsp. carthaginensis. In the Region of Murcia, the latter taxon is protected under the category of "special interest".

- Sideritis almeriensis Pau
- Sideritis briquetiana Font Quer & Pau
- Sideritis debeauxii Font Quer
- Sideritis foucauldiana Sennen & Mauricio
- Sideritis granatensis (Pau) Alcaraz & al.
- Sideritis granatensis subsp. briquetiana (Font Quer & Pau) Socorro & Arrebola
- Sideritis hirsuta var. granatensis Pau
- Sideritis kebdanensis Sennen
- Sideritis pusilla subsp. alhamillensis Obón & D.Rivera
- Sideritis pusilla subsp. briquetiana (Font Quer & Pau) D.Rivera & Obón
- Sideritis pusilla var. carthaginensis Font Quer
- Sideritis pusilla subsp. granatensis (Pau) D.Rivera & Obón
- Sideritis scordioides var. pusilla Lange

== Common names ==
Sideritis pusilla has several common names in Spanish, including garranchuelo (9), jajareña (2), jereña (2), rabogato (3), zahareña de la sierra, zajareña. (Note: These names are shared with other plants native to Spain; the number in parentheses indicates the number of species that have the same name.)
