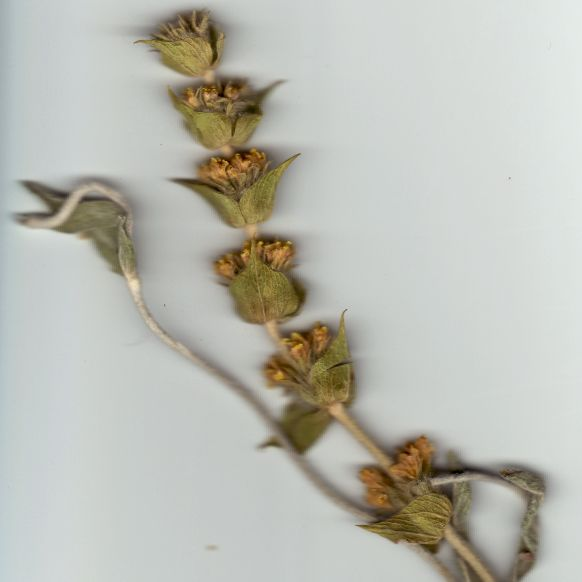
- Sideritis syriaca (ironwort)

Scientific classification
- Kingdom: Plantae
- Clade: Tracheophytes
- Clade: Angiosperms
- Clade: Eudicots
- Clade: Asterids
- Order: Lamiales
- Family: Lamiaceae
- Subfamily: Lamioideae
- Genus: Sideritis; L.

Species
- See text

= Sideritis =

Genus of plants

Sideritis, also known as ironwort, mountain tea and shepherd's tea, is a genus of flowering plants known for their use as herbal medicine, commonly as a herbal tea. They are abundant in Mediterranean regions, the Balkans, the Iberian Peninsula and Macaronesia, but can also be found in Central Europe and temperate Asia.

== History and etymology ==
In Greek, "sideritis" (Gr: σιδηρίτις) can be literally translated as "he who is made of iron". The plant was known to ancient Greeks, specifically Pedanius Dioscorides and Theophrastus. Although Dioscorides describes three species, only one (probably S. scordioides) is thought to belong to Sideritis. In ancient times "sideritis" was a generic reference for plants capable of healing wounds caused by iron weapons during battles. However, others hold that the name stems from the shape of the sepal, which resembles the tip of a spear.

== Taxonomy ==
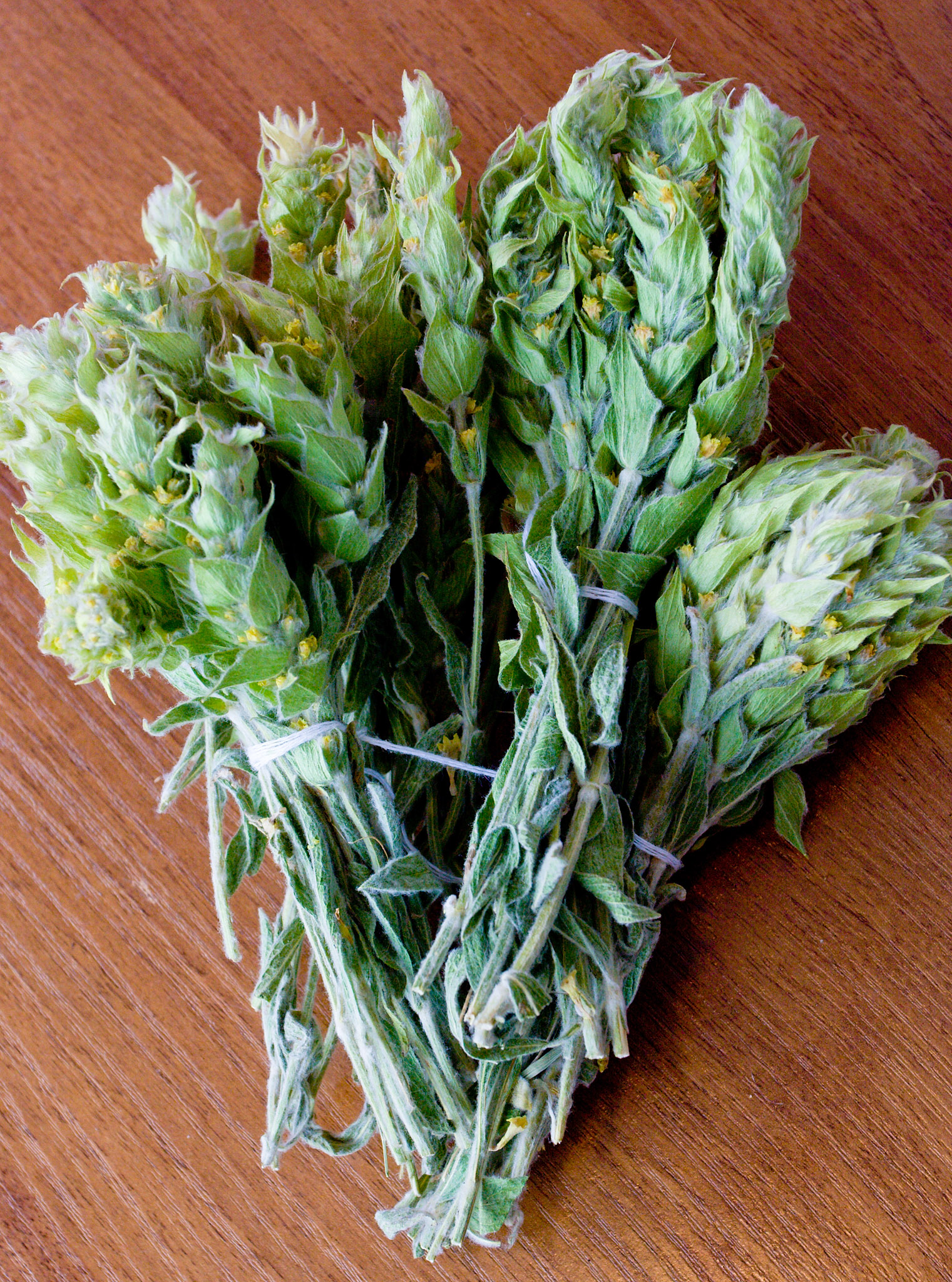
Sideritis scardica

In 2002, molecular phylogenetic research found Sideritis and five other genera to be embedded in Stachys. Further studies will be needed before Stachys, Sideritis, and their closest relatives can be revised.

Some schemes recognize and categorize up to 319 distinct species, subspecies, ecotypes, forms or cultivars, including:

- Sideritis barbellata Mend.-Heu. - endemic to the Canary Island of La Palma, Spain
- Sideritis candicans Aiton - endemic to Madeira, Bugio Island and Porto Santo Island
- Sideritis cypria Post - endemic to Cyprus
- Sideritis elica - endemic to the Rhodope Mountains in Bulgaria
- Sideritis euboea Heldr - found in the island of Euboea
- Sideritis hyssopifolia L. - mountains of the Iberian Peninsula
- Sideritis lanata L. - native to the Balkans - Bulgaria, Greece and parts of former Yugoslavia - and Turkey
- Sideritis leucantha Cav. - endemic to Spain
- Sideritis macrostachyos Poir. - endemic to the Canary Island of Tenerife, Spain
- Sideritis montana L. - native to Eurasia from Spain to China, as well as the Maghreb
- Sideritis purpurea Talb. - found in western Greece, the Ionian Islands and Crete
- Sideritis pusilla Griseb. - native to Spain and Algeria
- Sideritis raiseri Boiss & Heldr - found in Mount Tomori, Albania
- Sideritis romana L. - found in the Mediterranean
- Sideritis scardica Gris. - native to the Sharr Mountains extending from Kosovo and North Macedonia to Albania, as well as to Bulgaria and Greece
- Sideritis syriaca L., S. cretica Boiss, S. boissieri Magn. - found in Syria, Turkey and Crete and collectively known as Malotira (Μαλοτήρα)
- Sideritis theezans Boiss & Heldr - found in the Peloponnese

Botanists have encountered difficulties in naming and classifying the varieties of Sideritis due to their subtle differences. One particularly confusing case is that of S. angustifolia Lagasca and S. tragoriganum Lagasca.

== Botany ==
The genus is composed of short (8–50 cm), xerophytic subshrubs or herbs, annual or perennial, that grow at high elevation (usually over 1000 m) with little or no soil, often on the surface of rocks.

It is pubescent, either villous or coated by a fine, woolly layer of microscopic intertwined hairs.

Sideritis inflorescence is verticillaster.

== Gallery ==
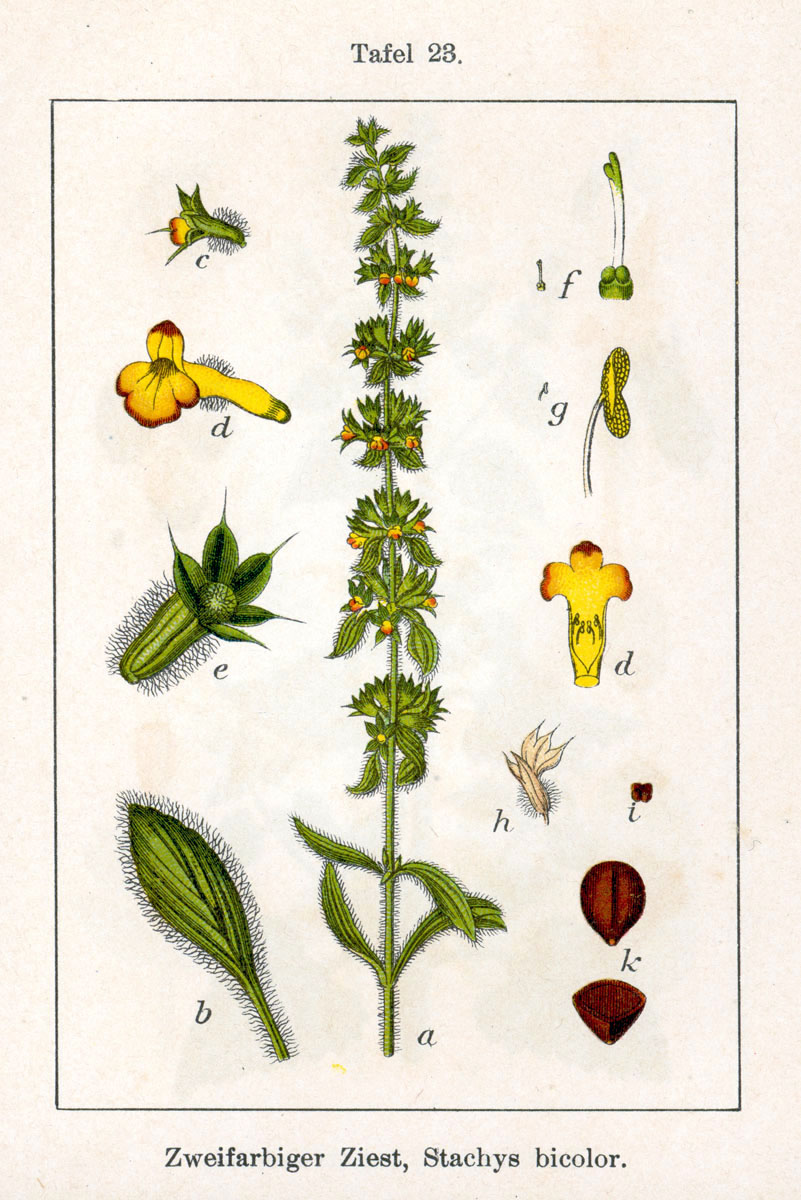
Sideritis montana

== Uses ==
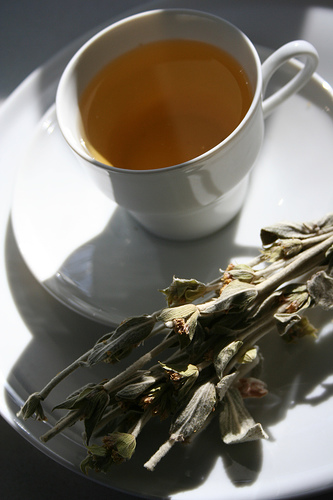
Ironwort herbal tea.

In Albania, Bulgaria, Greece, North Macedonia, and Turkey, Sideritis scardica, Sideritis clandestina, Sideritis syriaca, Sideritis perfoliata and various other species from the section Empedoclia are used as herbs either for the preparation of herbal teas, or for their aromatic properties in local cuisines. The herbal tea is commonly prepared by decoction, by boiling the stems, leaves and flowers in a pot of water, then often serving with honey and lemon.

Some plants in the genus have a history of use in traditional herbal medicine. Research into the potential effects has taken place in universities in the Netherlands and in the southern Balkans where the plant is indigenous.

Chemical constituents include diterpenoids and flavonoids.

=== Cultivation ===
Sideritis raeseri is the most commonly cultivated Sideritis in Albania, Bulgaria, Greece, and North Macedonia, where advanced hybrids also exist. Planting is recommended during two periods (October–November or February–March in the Northern hemisphere) and gathering in July, when in full bloom. The plant is typically dried before usage.
