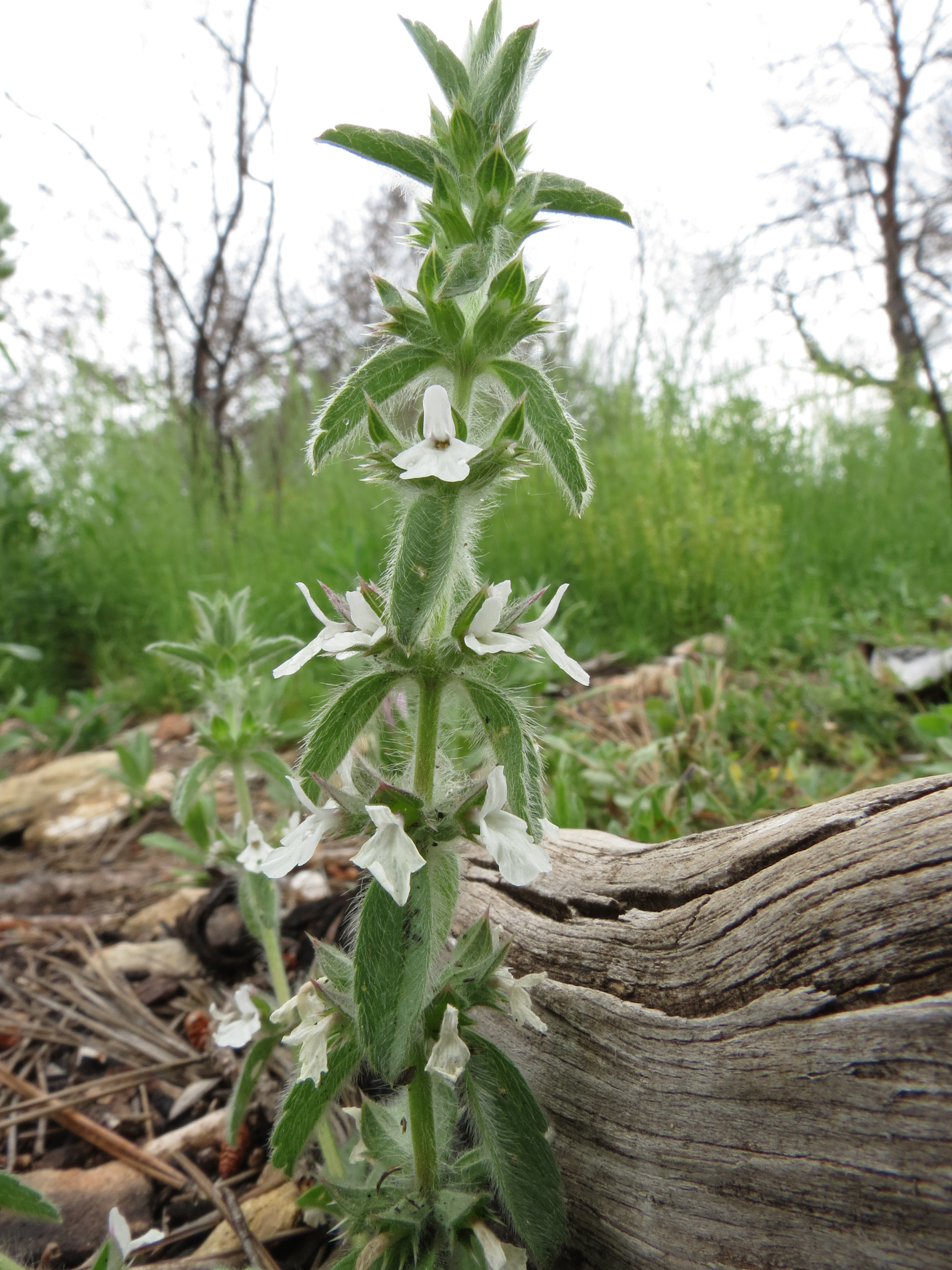

Scientific classification
- Kingdom: Plantae
- Clade: Tracheophytes
- Clade: Angiosperms
- Clade: Eudicots
- Clade: Asterids
- Order: Lamiales
- Family: Lamiaceae
- Genus: Sideritis
- Species: S. romana

Binomial name
- Sideritis romana L.

= Sideritis romana =

Species of plant

Sideritis romana, the simplebeak ironwort, is a species of shrub in the family Lamiaceae. They have a self-supporting growth form and simple, broad leaves. Flowers are visited by European wool carder bee, Rhodanthidium septemdentatum, Amegilla, and Osmia andrenoides. Individuals can grow to 0.15 m.

== Sources ==
This article incorporates text from a free content work. Licensed under CC0 (license statement/permission). Text taken from Sideritis romana. Encyclopedia of Life.
