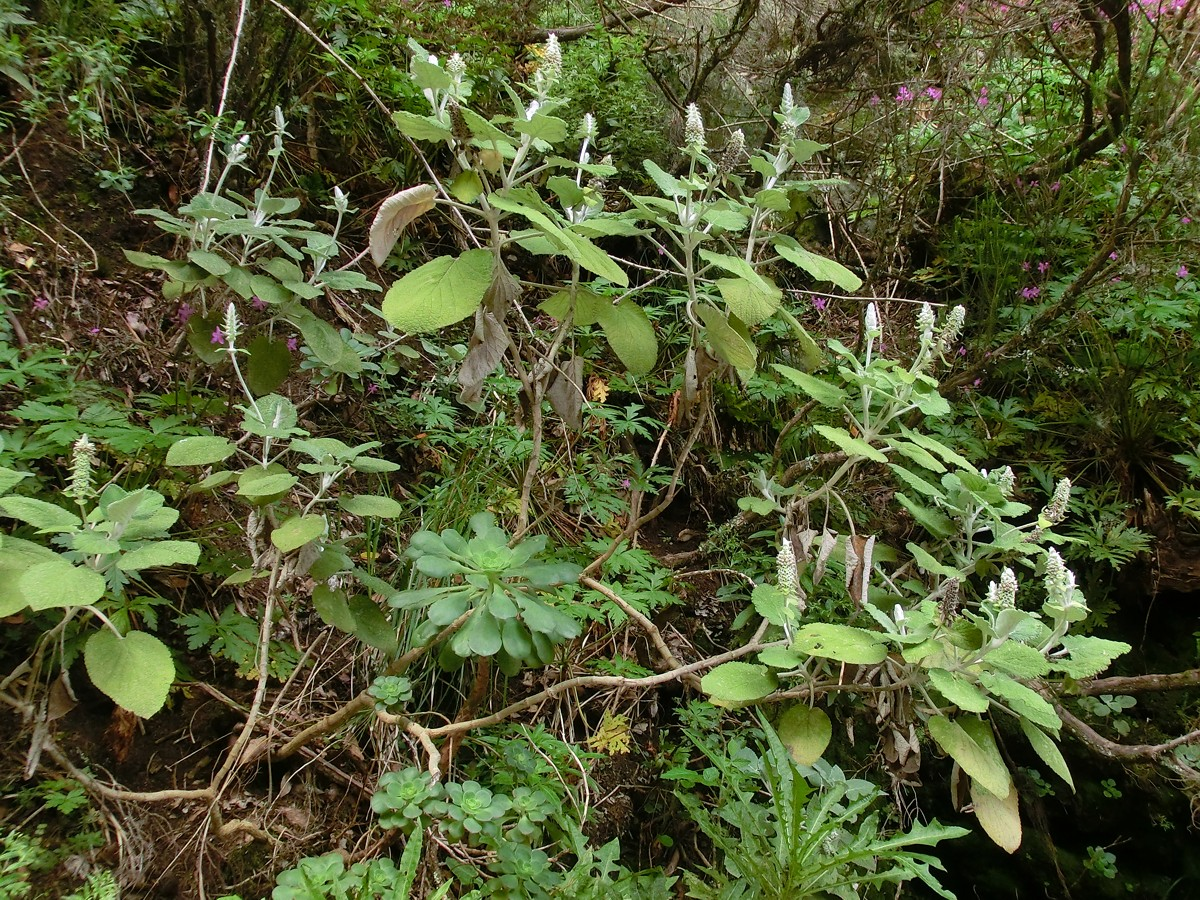
- In habitat in Tenerife

Scientific classification
- Kingdom: Plantae
- Clade: Tracheophytes
- Clade: Angiosperms
- Clade: Eudicots
- Clade: Asterids
- Order: Lamiales
- Family: Lamiaceae
- Genus: Sideritis
- Species: S. macrostachyos

Binomial name
- Sideritis macrostachyos Poir.

Synonyms
- Leucophae macrostachyos (Poir.) Webb & Berthel.

= Sideritis macrostachyos =

Species of flowering plant

Sideritis macrostachyos is a species of flowering plant in the family Lamiaceae, native to north and north-eastern Tenerife in the Canary Islands.

== Description ==
Sideritis macrostachyos has branched woody stems. The thick, wrinkled leaves are petiolate (stalked) and crenulate in outline. The upper leaves are oval, the lower ones very large and more rounded. The upper surface of the leaves is green, and ranges from pubescent (softly hairy) in the upper leaves to almost glabrous (smooth) in the lower leaves. The lower surface of the leaves is white with cottony down. The flowers are arranged in terminal spikes which are large, stiff and tufted in appearance. The individual flowers are sessile and arranged in tight whorls separated by small bracts. The seeds are small, brown and rounded.

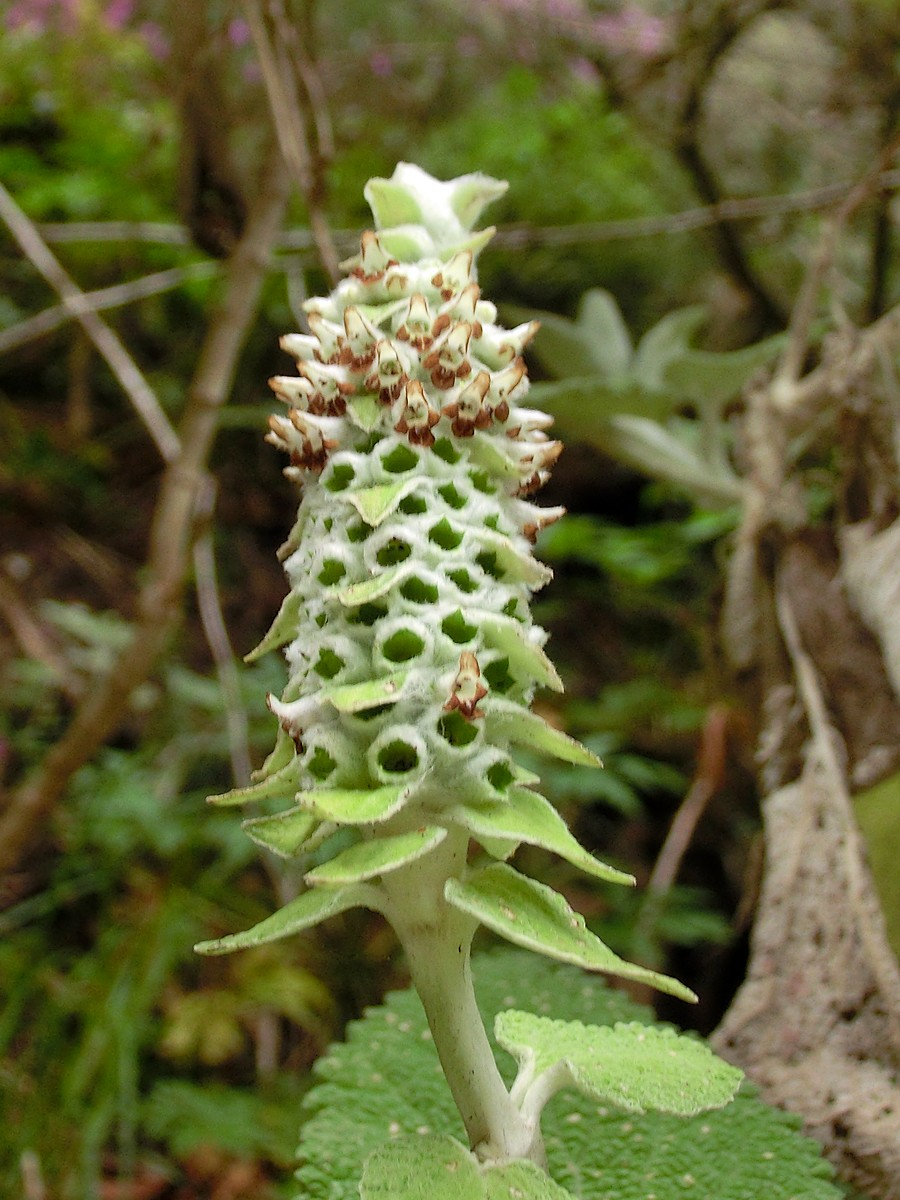
Flowers

== Taxonomy ==
Sideritis macrostachyos was first described by Jean Poiret in 1811. The epithet macrostachyos is correct as published by Poiret; stachyos is an adjective derived from Greek, whose masculine and feminine forms both end in -os. In some sources, it has been wrongly changed to macrostachya, or to macrostachys.
