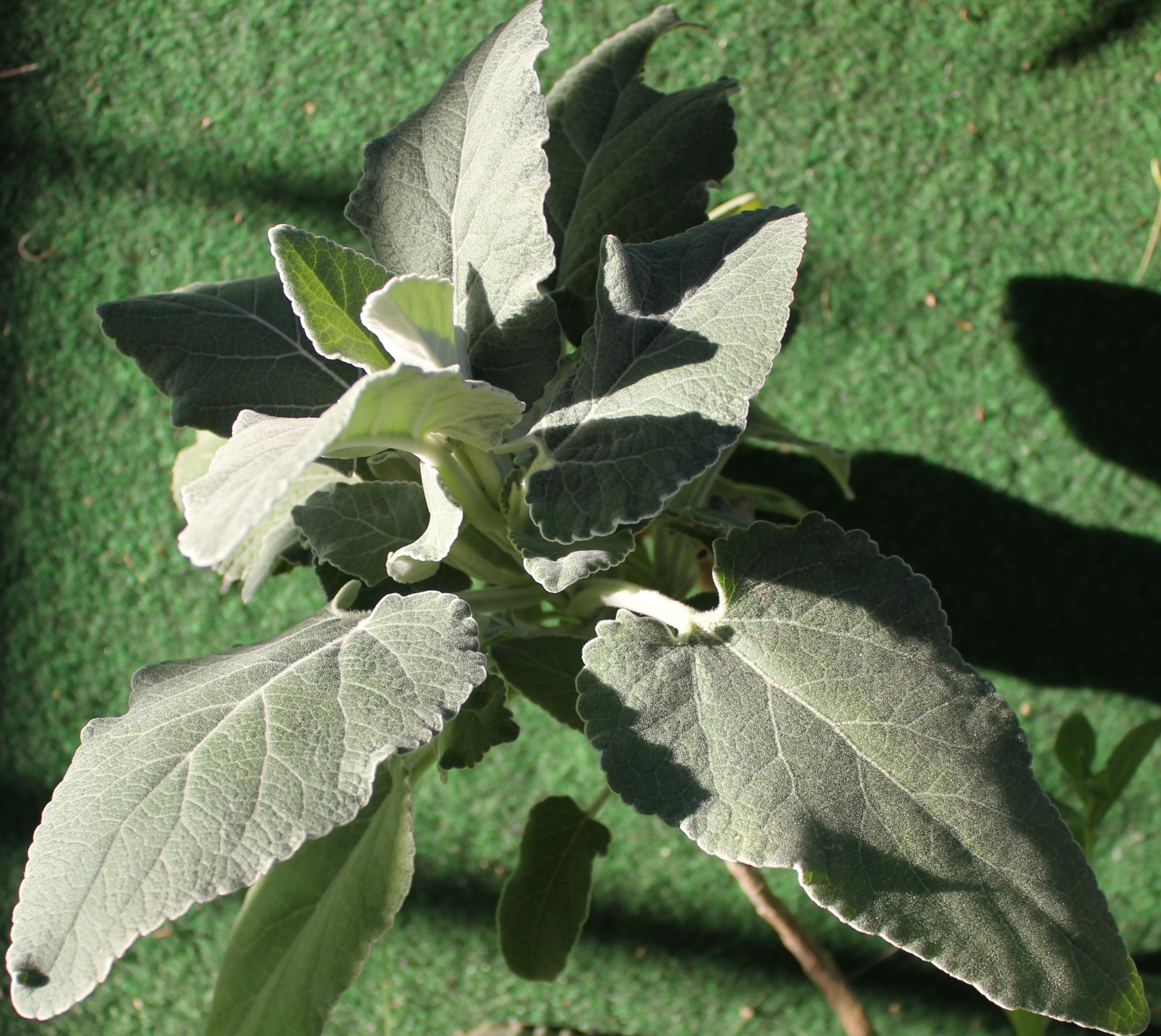

Scientific classification
- Kingdom: Plantae
- Clade: Tracheophytes
- Clade: Angiosperms
- Clade: Eudicots
- Clade: Asterids
- Order: Lamiales
- Family: Lamiaceae
- Genus: Sideritis
- Species: S. barbellata

Binomial name
- Sideritis barbellata Mend.-Heuer

Synonyms
- Leucophae barbellata (Mend.-Heuer) G.Kunkel

= Sideritis barbellata =

Species of shrub

Sideritis barbellata is a small erect shrub, laxly branched, whitish-yellow tomentose. Leaves are generally green-glabrescent above, ovate-lanceolate, the base cordiform. Inflorescences are erect, verticillasters, branched with 1–3 series of sterile bracts subtending the branches, and with slightly curved flowers.

== Distribution ==
Endemic to the Canary Island of La Palma: Throughout the island, principally in pine and thermophyle forest zones 200–1500 m. Fuencaliente de La Palma, Tigalate, Mazo, Barranco del Rio, Gallegos, Izcagua, El Pinar, Barranco de las Angustias, La Cumbrecita, Bejenado etc.
