= Pentahydroxyflavone =

Pentahydroxyflavone may refer to:

- Hypolaetin (3',4',5,7,8-pentahydroxyflavone)
- Quercetin (3,5,7,3',4'-pentahydroxyflavone)
- Robinetin (3,7,3',4',5'-pentahydroxyflavone)
- Tricetin (5,7,3',4',5'-pentahydroxyflavone)
