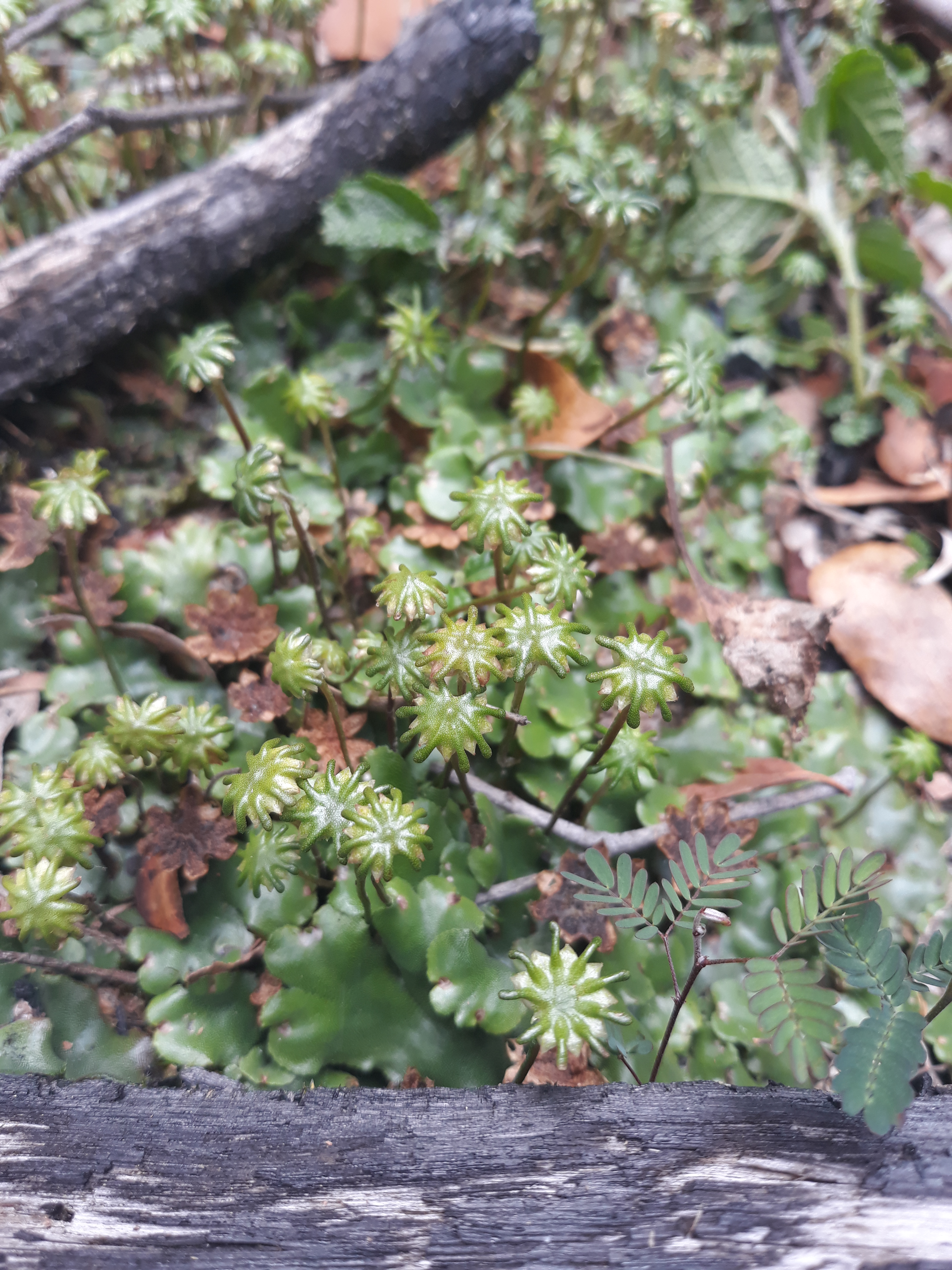
- Marchantia berteroana, with female gametangia known as archegoniophores

Scientific classification
- Kingdom: Plantae
- Division: Marchantiophyta
- Class: Marchantiopsida
- Order: Marchantiales
- Family: Marchantiaceae
- Genus: Marchantia
- Species: M. berteroana

Binomial name
- Marchantia berteroana Lehm. and Lindenb.

= Marchantia berteroana =

Species of liverwort

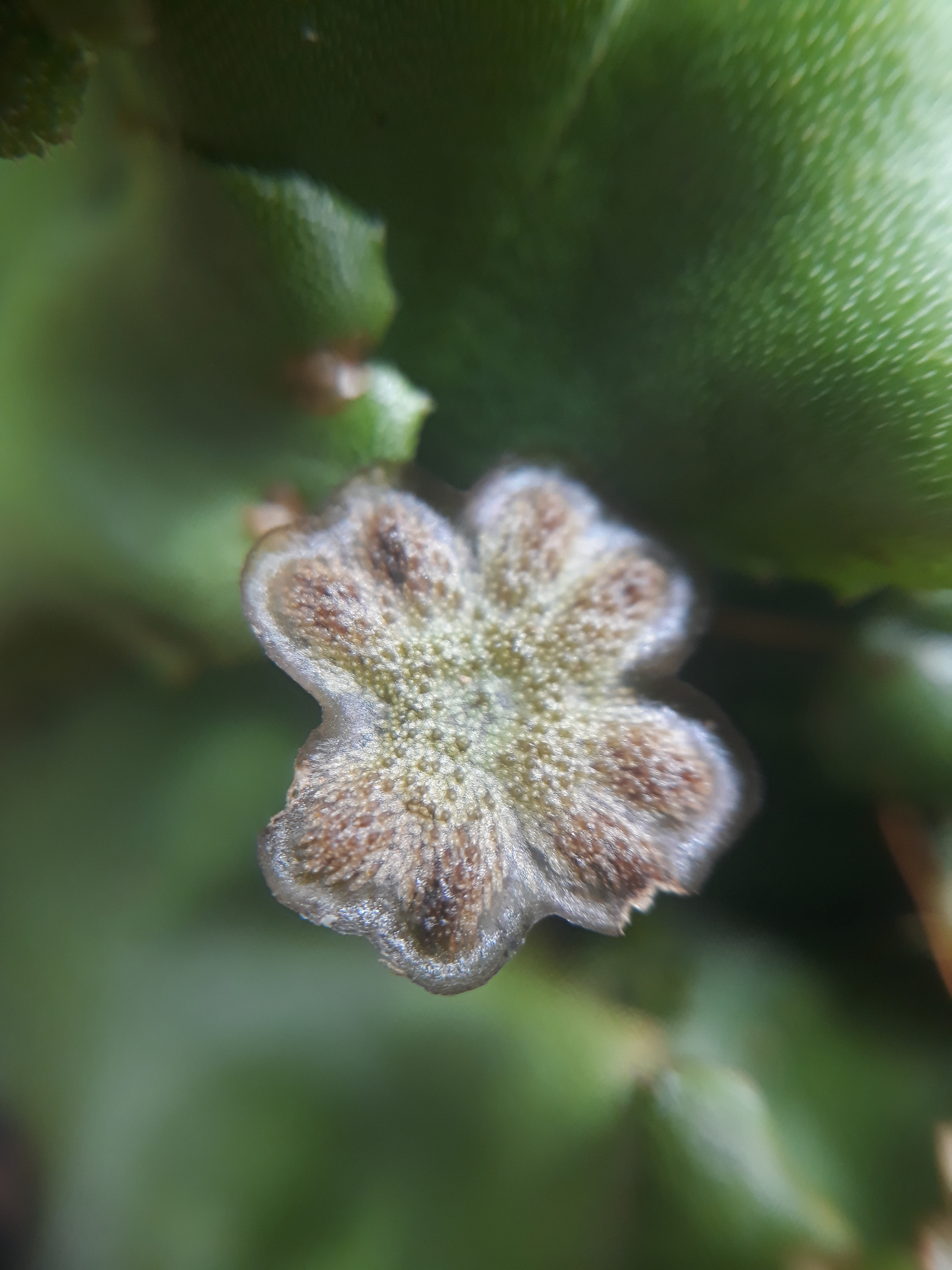
Marchantia berteroana, male gametangium, known as an antheridiophore

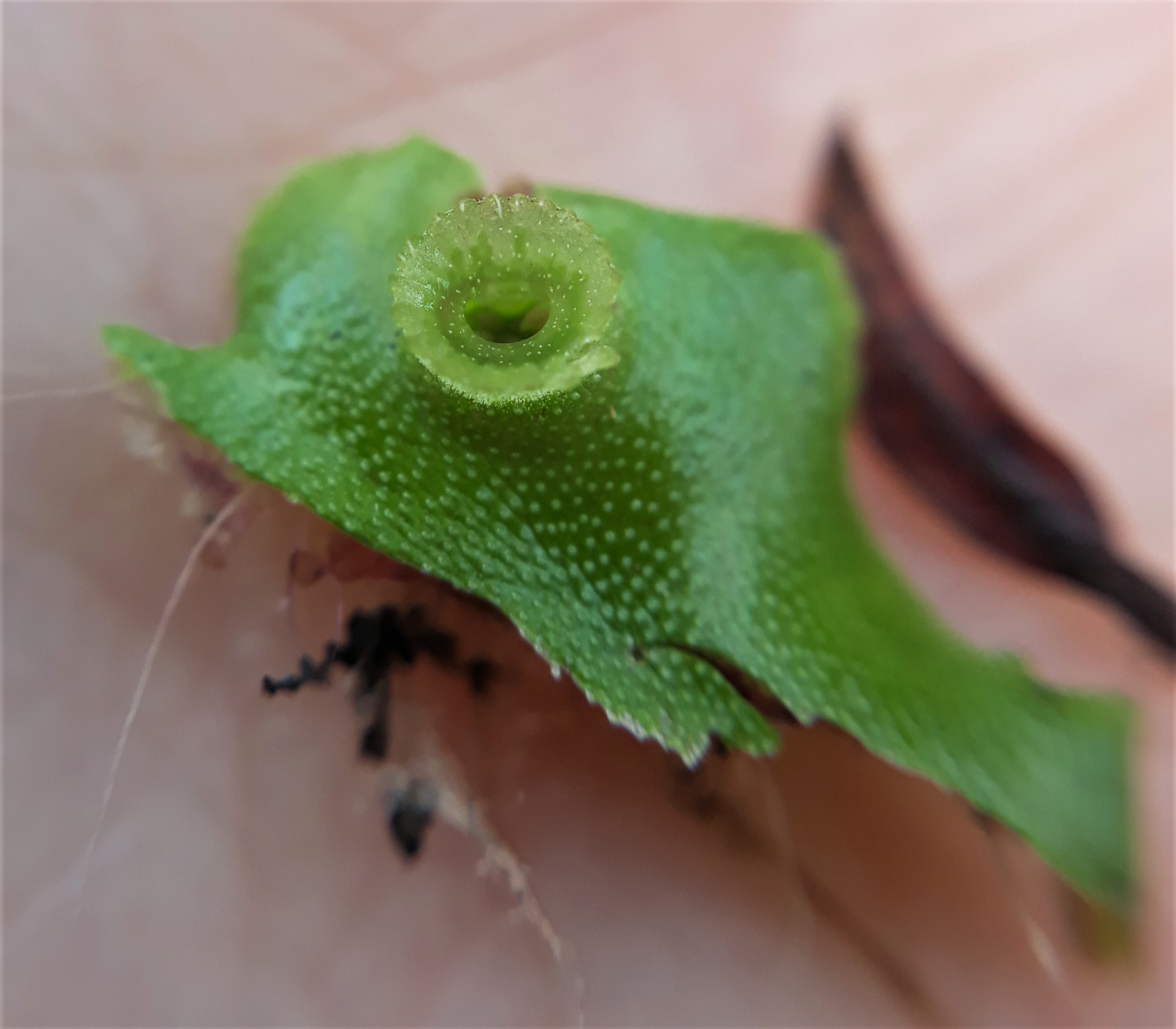
Marchantia beteroana gemma cup

Marchantia berteroana is a liverwort species in the genus Marchantia.

== Description ==
Marchantia berteroana is a flat, thalloid liverwort, with thallus up to 2 cm (0.79 in) long and 1.2 cm (0.47 in) wide. The thallus colour can range from dark green to yellow with a glossy surface, and is attached to the ground via rhizoids. Under a lens, pores can be seen on the upper surface. The gametangia (sex organs) grow vertically from the thallus, the plant is dioicous so individual plants produce male or female gametangia. The male gametangia are called an antheridiophores, they are short with a flat disc-like structure which is approximately 1 cm (0.39 in) wide. The female gametangia are called archegoniophores, they have a taller stem and an umbrella-like structure at the top, approximately 1 cm (0.39 in) wide, from which the common name is derived. They also reproduce asexually via gemma cups which form on the surface of the thallus, they are approx. 4 mm (0.16 in) wide and 3 mm (0.12 in) high. Gemma cups appear on the thallus more commonly in winter when rainfall is higher, as raindrops are required to disperse the gemmules.

Marchantia berteroana contains the flavones isoscutellarein and hypolaetin 8-glucuronides. The composition and amount of these chemicals changes seasonally depending on the reproductive state of the plant, when gametangia are present there is an absence of acacetin and its glycosides.

=== Similar species ===
Marchantia polymorpha is a similar in appearance, it can be distinguished from M. berteroana by the colour of the thallus, M. polymorpha is a dull green and often has a dark streak in the middle of the upper surface. M. berteroana has brighter green thallus and usually no streaks on the upper surface. M. beteroana also has transparent scales on the underside of the thallus which help distinguish it from Marchantia foliacea which has dark purple/brown scales.

== Ecology ==
=== Distribution ===
Marchantia berteroana can be found in Australia, New Zealand, Southern Africa, South America, Antarctica and, non-continental locations such as Papua New Guinea, Java, New Caledonia and various smaller islands.

=== Habitat ===
M berteroana prefers moist environments such as near fresh water sources, waterfall splash zones and, forest floors. It is also known to be one of the first colonising species after bushfire in Tasmanian mixed forests.

=== Reproduction ===
See Marchantia
