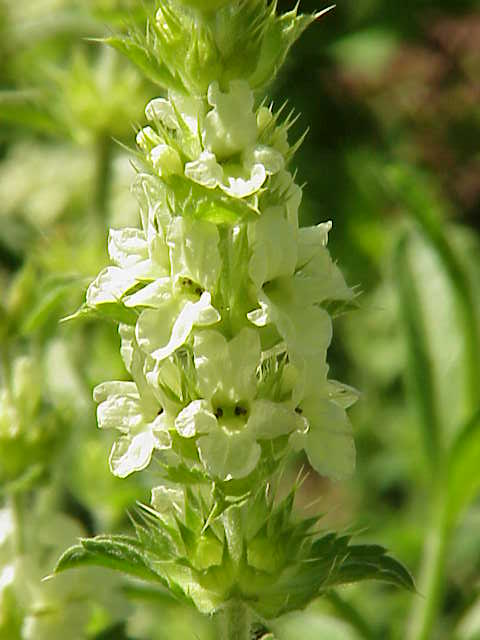

Scientific classification
- Kingdom: Plantae
- Clade: Tracheophytes
- Clade: Angiosperms
- Clade: Eudicots
- Clade: Asterids
- Order: Lamiales
- Family: Lamiaceae
- Genus: Sideritis
- Species: S. hyssopifolia

Binomial name
- Sideritis hyssopifolia L.

= Sideritis hyssopifolia =

Species of shrub

Sideritis hyssopifolia, hyssop-leaved mountain ironwort. A 40 cm high shrublet with narrow pointed leaves. The flowers (1 cm) are borne in dense cylindrical clusters from broad spiny-toothed bracts. The calyx also has spiny teeth. Flowers June–August. Its IUCN Red List Category is least risk.

The Latin word hyssopifolia (which also occurs in several other plant names, including that of Cuphea hyssopifolia) means "hyssop-leaved".

== Distribution ==
Mountains of Southwestern Europe at 1500–1800 m altitude.

== Gallery ==
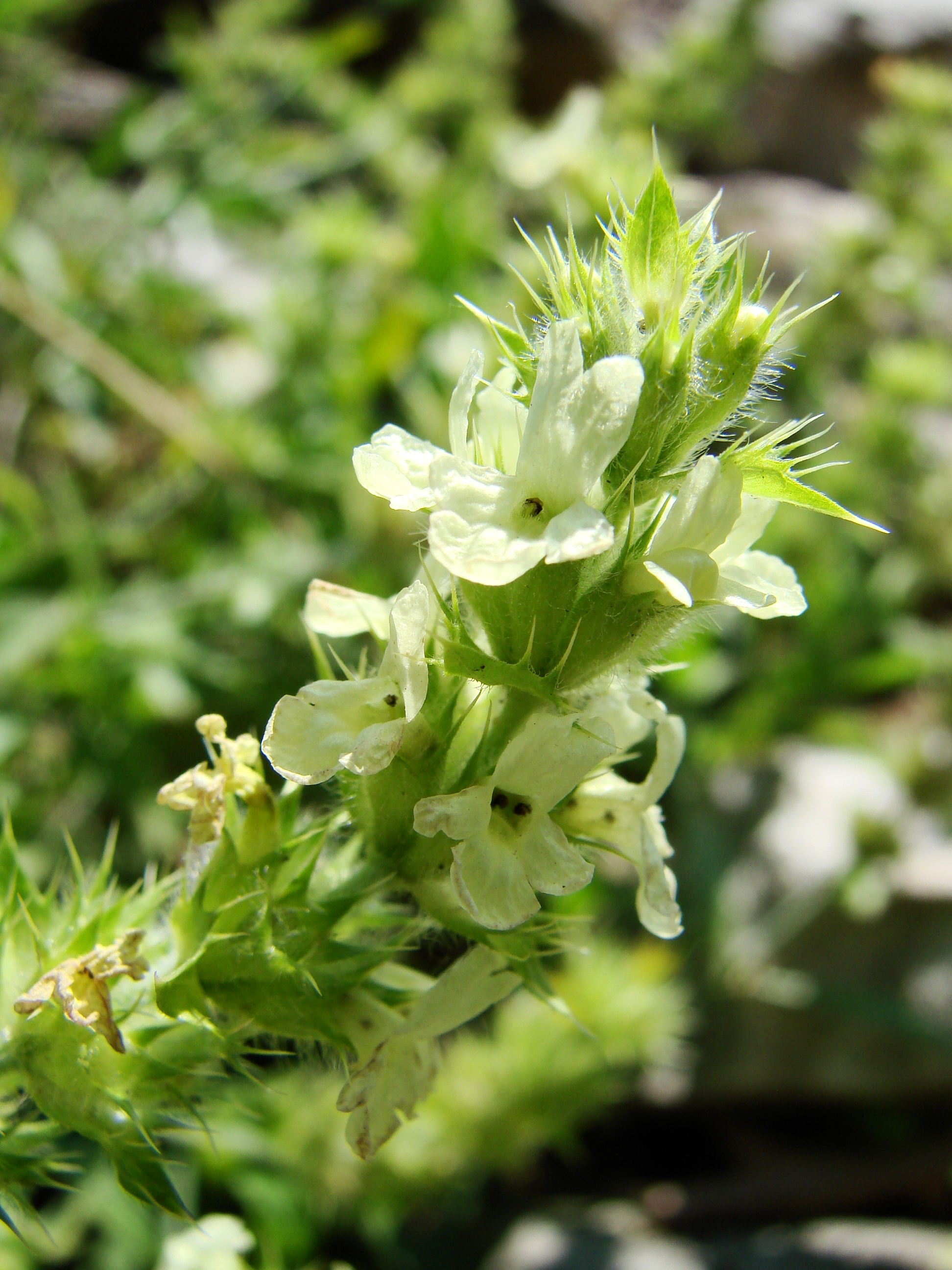

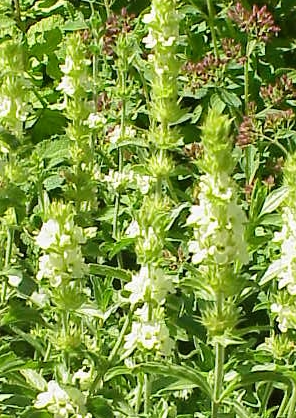

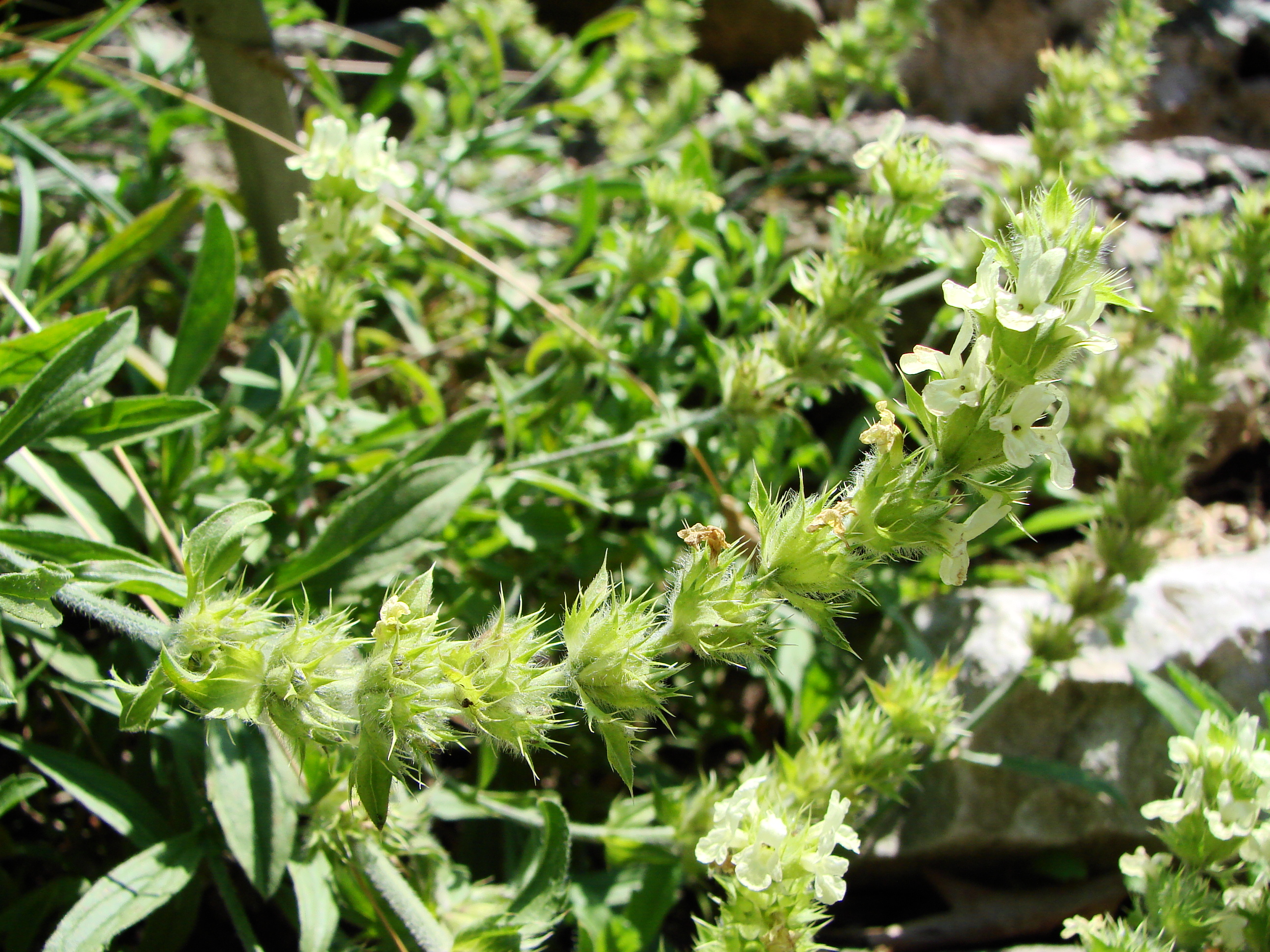

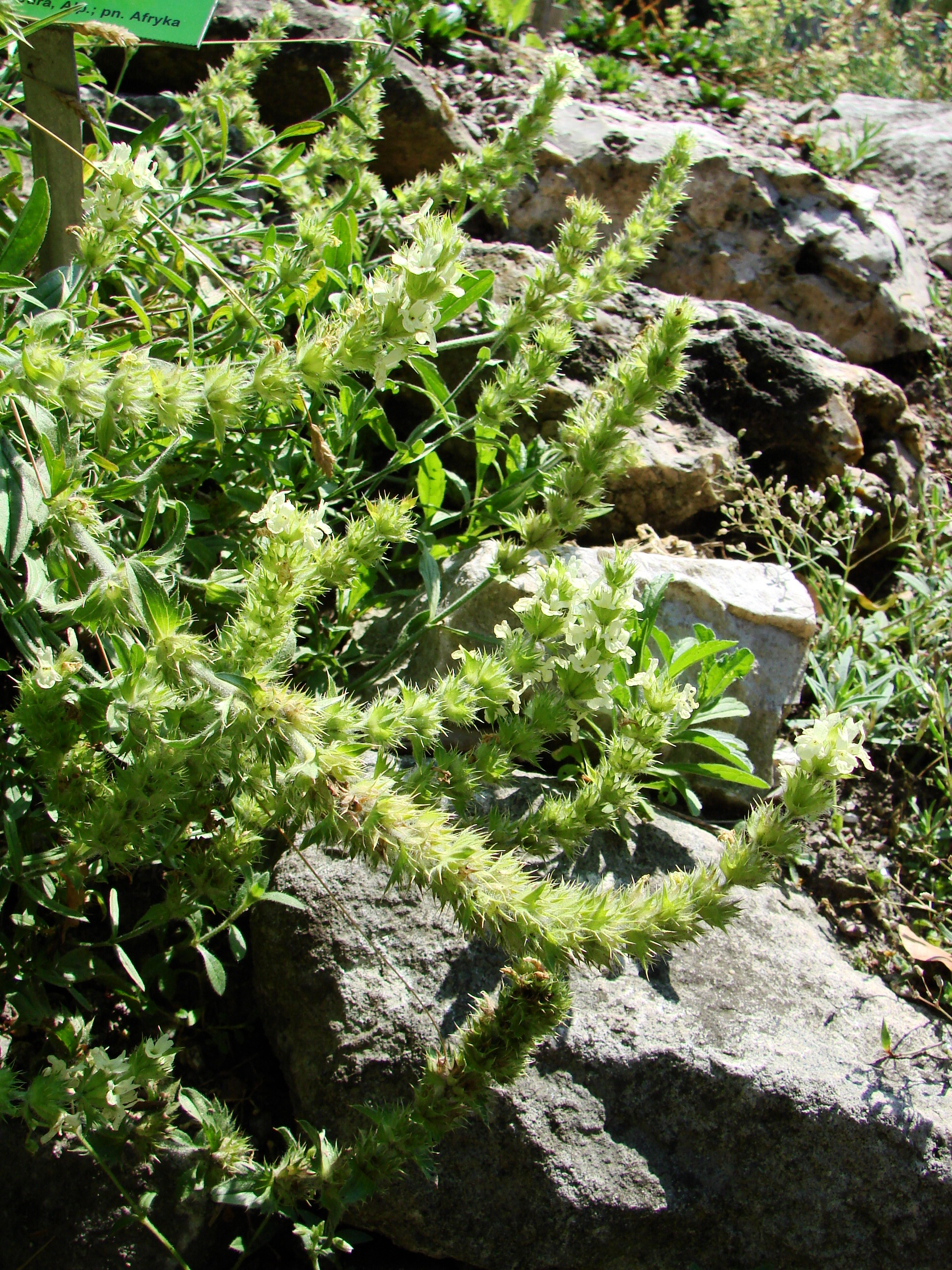
