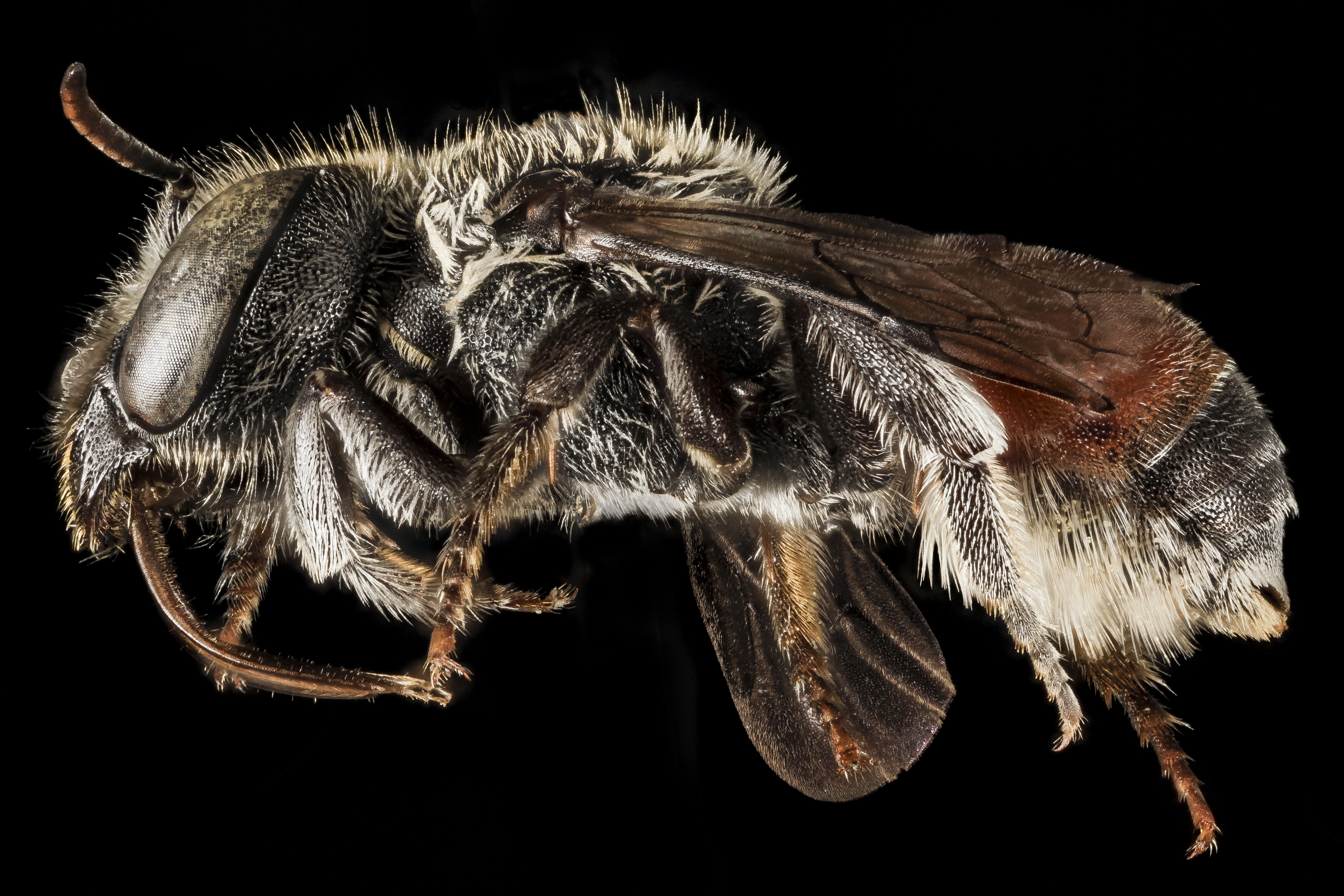

Scientific classification
- Domain: Eukaryota
- Kingdom: Animalia
- Phylum: Arthropoda
- Class: Insecta
- Order: Hymenoptera
- Family: Megachilidae
- Genus: Osmia
- Species: O. andrenoides

Binomial name
- Osmia andrenoides Spinola, 1808

= Osmia andrenoides =

Species of bee

Osmia andrenoides is a species of bee from the Osmia genus. Plants pollinated by them includes Lavandula and simplebeak ironwort, etc. It occurs in West and Central Europe.
