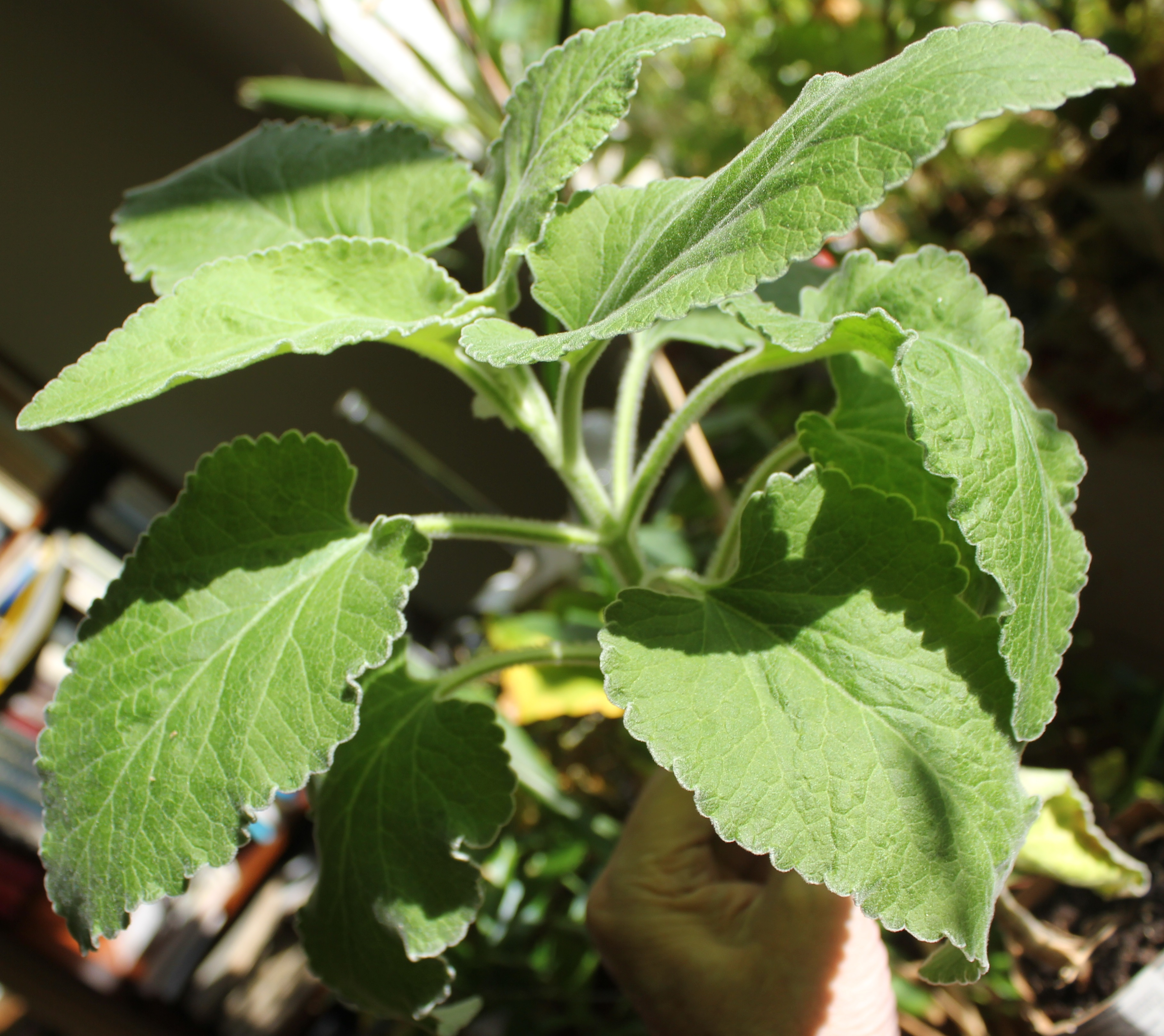

Scientific classification
- Kingdom: Plantae
- Clade: Tracheophytes
- Clade: Angiosperms
- Clade: Eudicots
- Clade: Asterids
- Order: Lamiales
- Family: Lamiaceae
- Genus: Sideritis
- Species: S. candicans

Binomial name
- Sideritis candicans Aiton

= Sideritis candicans =

Species of shrub

Sideritis candicans (erva branca, selvageira). More or less white to greyish, densely tomentose shrub 45–100 cm. Leaves 2.5-12 x 1.5 x 7.5 cm, the lower ovate-lanceolate to ovate, acute to obtuse, rounded to cordate at base, weakly crenate to sub-entire, petiolate. Inflorescence up to 30 cm. Calyx 5–6.5 mm; teeth 1–1.5 mm. Corolla creamy yellow; tube 4–5.5 mm not exserted; upper lip 23–2.5 mm; lower lip 2.2-3.5 mm, the middle lobe shallowly notched. Nutlets 1.5 mm, ovoid. Flowers from March to July. Widespread in clearings and open sunny places mostly from 600 to 1700 m. Endemic to the islands of Madeira, Porto Santo and Bugio.

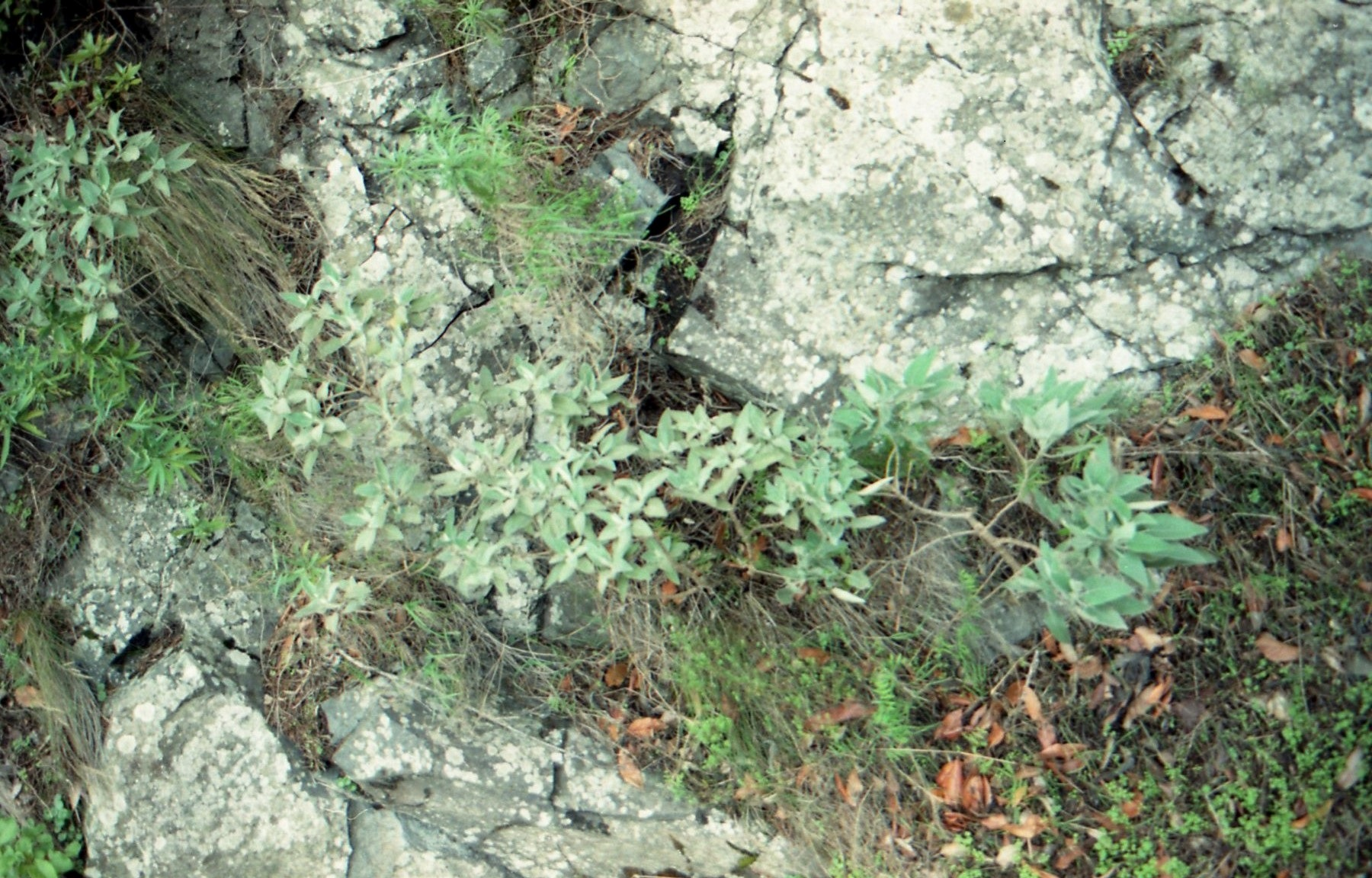
Sideritis candicans, São Vicente
