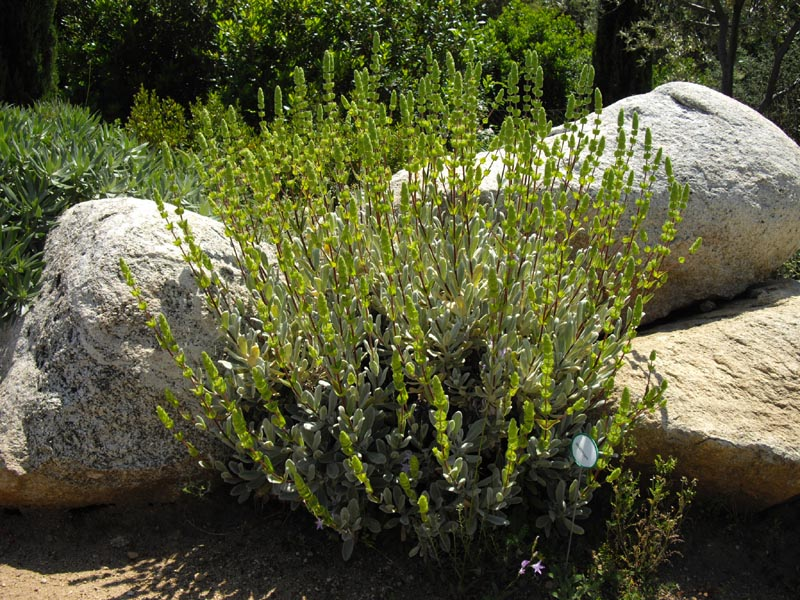

Conservation status
- Vulnerable (IUCN 3.1)

Scientific classification
- Kingdom: Plantae
- Clade: Tracheophytes
- Clade: Angiosperms
- Clade: Eudicots
- Clade: Asterids
- Order: Lamiales
- Family: Lamiaceae
- Genus: Sideritis
- Species: S. cypria

Binomial name
- Sideritis cypria Post

= Sideritis cypria =

Species of herb

Sideritis cypria, the Cyprus ironwort, is a species of flowering plant in the family Lamiaceae. Erect perennial herb with a woody base, 60 cm high, with densely hairy tetragonal shoots. Leaves, opposite, simple, obscurely serrate, densely hairy, thick, oblanceolate, 3-12 x 1–5 cm. Flowers in verticillasters subtended by the cup-like bracts, zygomorphic, corolla bright yellow. Flowers from June to August. Fruit of 4 nutlets.

== Habitat ==
South-facing, dry limestone cliffs, altitude 300–900 m.

== Distribution ==
A very rare and vulnerable species endemic to Cyprus. Restricted to the Pentadaktylos Range: Buffavento, St. Hilarion, Halevga, Bellapais, Yaïla etc.

== Gallery ==
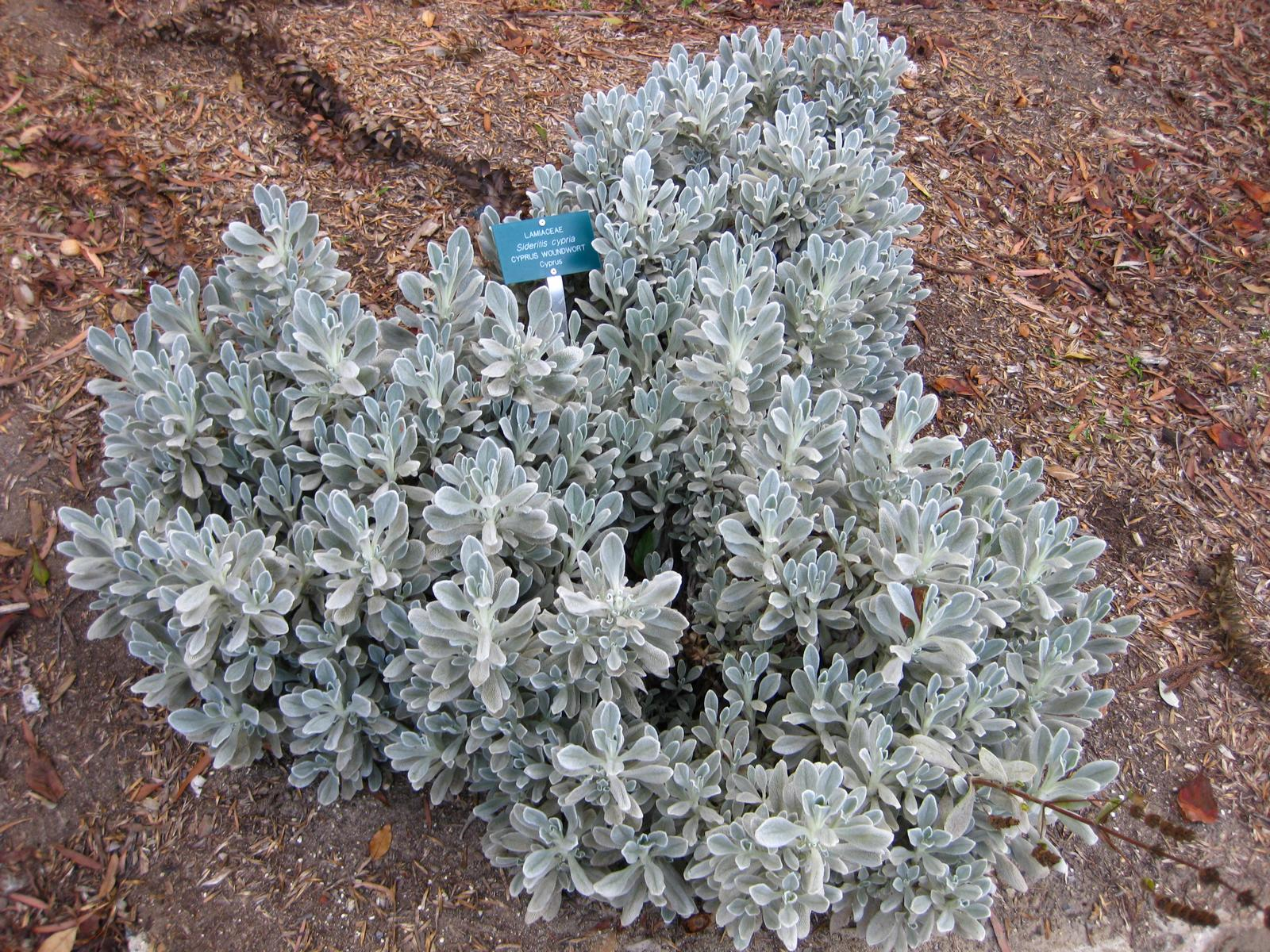

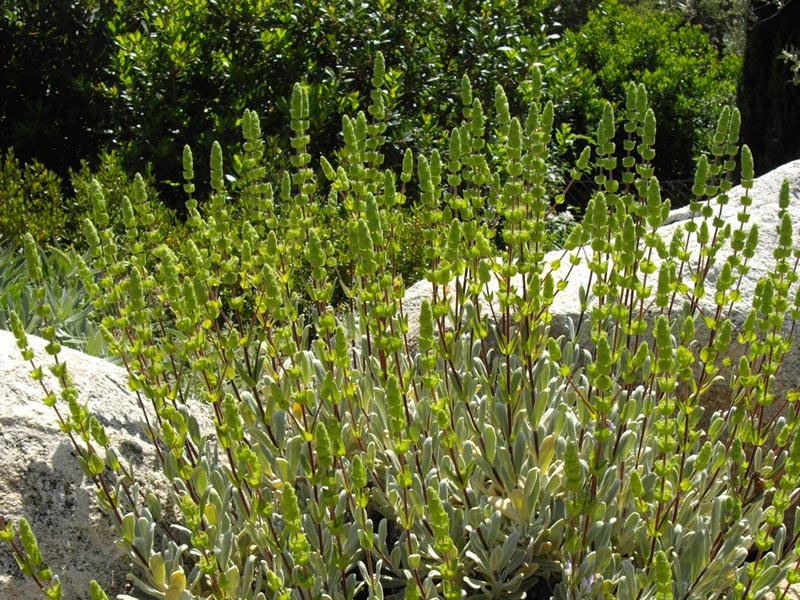
