= Robinetin =

Type of a flavone

Names
- IUPAC name 3,7-Dihydroxy-2-(3,4,5-trihydroxyphenyl)-4H-chromen-4-one
- Other names Norkanugin; 5-Hydroxyfisetin

Identifiers
CAS Number	490-31-3
3D model (JSmol)	Interactive image
ChEBI	CHEBI:8876
ChEMBL	ChEMBL170405
ChemSpider	4445009
ECHA InfoCard	100.007.009
EC Number	207-709-6
KEGG	C10177
PubChem CID	5281692
UNII	KJ6DBC4U7E
CompTox Dashboard (EPA)	DTXSID30197654
- InChI: InChI=1S/C15H10O7/c16-7-1-2-8-11(5-7)22-15(14(21)12(8)19)6-3-9(17)13(20)10(18)4-6/h1-5,16-18,20-21H Key: SOEDEYVDCDYMMH-UHFFFAOYSA-N
- SMILES: C1=CC2=C(C=C1O)OC(=C(C2=O)O)C3=CC(=C(C(=C3)O)O)O

Properties
Chemical formula	C_{15}H_{10}O_{7}
Molar mass	302.238 g·mol^{−1}
- Except where otherwise noted, data are given for materials in their standard state (at 25 °C [77 °F], 100 kPa). Infobox references

Robinetin is an organic compound in the flavone group with the molecular formula C_{15}H_{10}O_{7}. Chemically, it is a flavone with 5 hydroxy groups. Its name originates from the botanical name of the genus Robinia.

== Natural role ==
It has a role as a plant metabolite and is a pentahydroxyflavone and a 7-hydroxyflavonol. Robinetin is one of the basic chemical extracts of the species black locust, Robinia pseudoacacia and its wood, imparting a high biological resistance against several pathogens (fungi, insects).

As flavonoid, robinetin has also been isolated from the heartwood of the African species, Millettia stuhlmannii. In addition, robinetin has been identified as the major chemical component of the yellow-coloured deposits (exudates) found in Asian Merbau heartwood (Intsia spp.).

In plant systems, robinetin as flavonoids in general, help in combating oxidative stress and act as growth regulators.

== Research ==
Recent research has focused on the health aspects of flavonoids for humans, particularly that of robinetin. It has been shown to possess a certain antioxidative activity, free radical scavenging capacity, coronary heart disease prevention, hepatoprotective, anti-inflammatory, and anticancer activities.

Robinetin also can inhibit lipid peroxidation and protein glycosylation.
