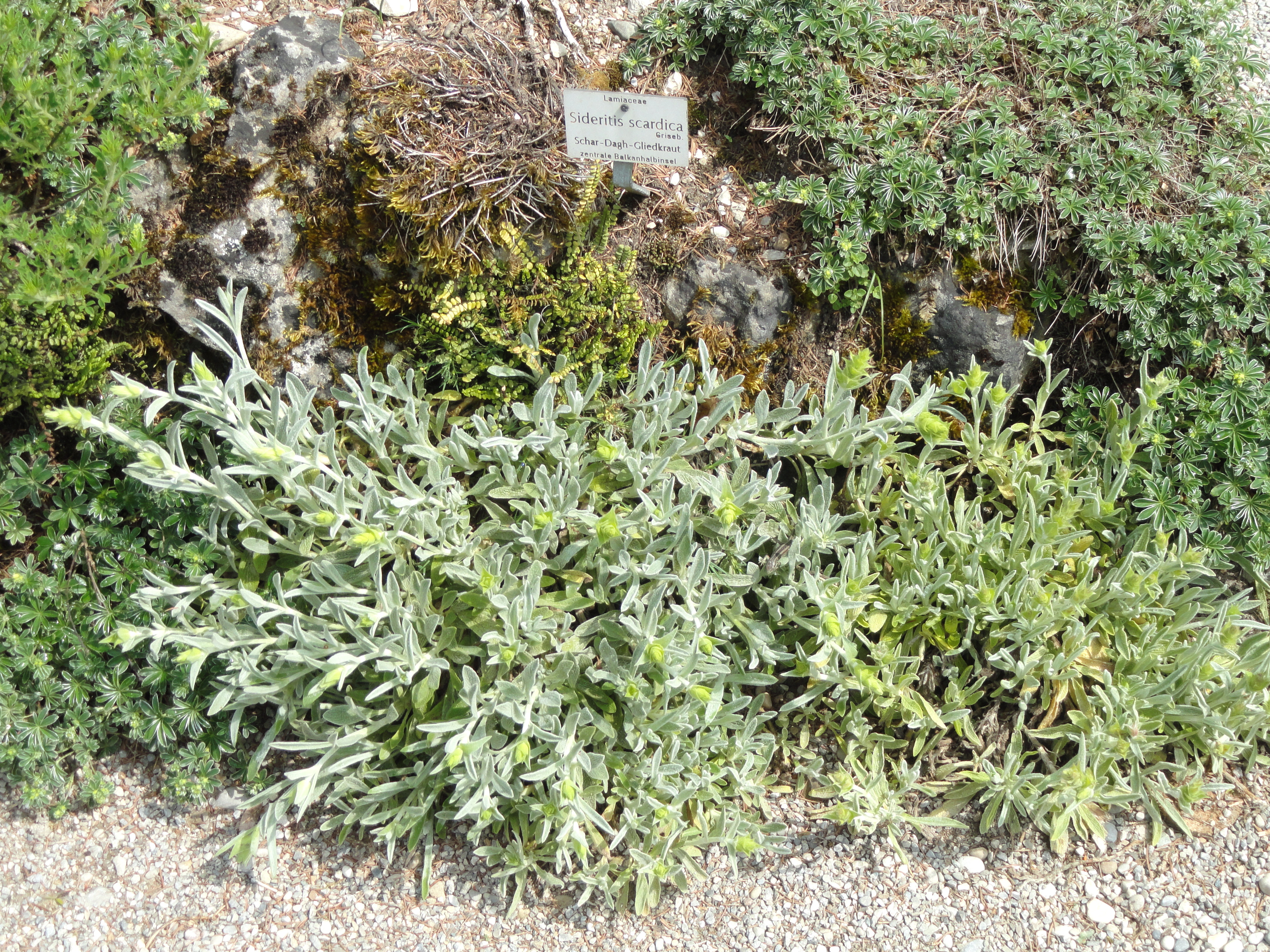

Conservation status
- Near Threatened (IUCN 3.1)

Scientific classification
- Kingdom: Plantae
- Clade: Tracheophytes
- Clade: Angiosperms
- Clade: Eudicots
- Clade: Asterids
- Order: Lamiales
- Family: Lamiaceae
- Genus: Sideritis
- Species: S. scardica

Binomial name
- Sideritis scardica Griseb.

Synonyms
- Navicularia scardica (Griseb.) Soják; Sideritis florida Boiss. & Heldr.; Sideritis raeseri subsp. florida (Boiss. & Heldr.) Papan. & Kokkini; Sideritis scardica subsp. longibracteata Papan. & Kokkini

= Sideritis scardica =

Species of flowering plant

Sideritis scardica is a species of flowering plant in the family Lamiaceae. Commonly known as Greek mountain tea, it is a flowering plant species of Sideritis, native to Albania, Bulgaria, Greece (particularly in the area of Mount Olympus), Kosovo, and North Macedonia. It was first described in 1844.
