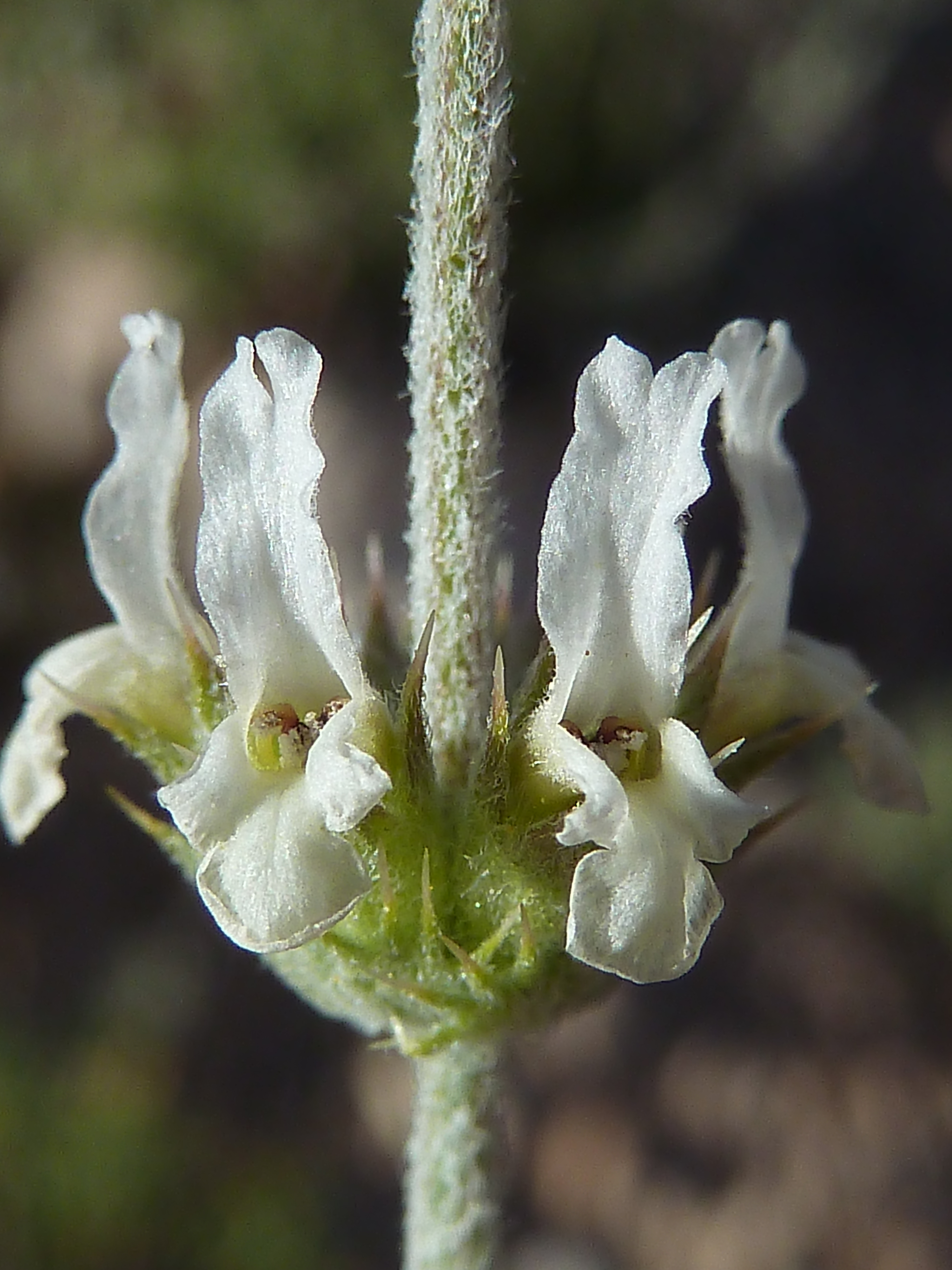
- Sideritis leucantha flowers

Conservation status
- Least Concern (IUCN 3.1)

Scientific classification
- Kingdom: Plantae
- Clade: Tracheophytes
- Clade: Angiosperms
- Clade: Eudicots
- Clade: Asterids
- Order: Lamiales
- Family: Lamiaceae
- Genus: Sideritis
- Species: S. leucantha

Binomial name
- Sideritis leucantha Cav.

= Sideritis leucantha =

Species of flowering plant

Sideritis leucantha is a plant species in the genus Sideritis, endemic to Spain.

Hypolaetin 8-glucoside, a glycoside of hypolaetin, can be found in Sideritis leucantha.
