= Hypolaetin =

Names
- IUPAC name 3′,4′,5,7,8-Pentahydroxyflavone
- Systematic IUPAC name 2-(3,4-Dihydroxyphenyl)-5,7,8-trihydroxy-4H-1-benzopyran-4-one
- Other names 8-Hydroxyluteolin

Identifiers
CAS Number	27696-41-9
3D model (JSmol)	Interactive image
ChemSpider	4444967
PubChem CID	5281648
UNII	P9TM8PY56J
CompTox Dashboard (EPA)	DTXSID70415167
- InChI: InChI=1S/C15H10O7/c16-7-2-1-6(3-8(7)17)12-5-10(19)13-9(18)4-11(20)14(21)15(13)22-12/h1-5,16-18,20-21H Key: ASOIXDIITRKTOX-UHFFFAOYSA-N; InChI=1/C15H10O7/c16-7-2-1-6(3-8(7)17)12-5-10(19)13-9(18)4-11(20)14(21)15(13)22-12/h1-5,16-18,20-21H Key: ASOIXDIITRKTOX-UHFFFAOYAN
- SMILES: C1=CC(=C(C=C1C2=CC(=O)C3=C(O2)C(=C(C=C3O)O)O)O)O

Properties
Chemical formula	C_{15}H_{10}O_{7}
Molar mass	302.23 g/mol
- Except where otherwise noted, data are given for materials in their standard state (at 25 °C [77 °F], 100 kPa). Infobox references

Hypolaetin is a flavone. It is the aglycone of hypolaetin 8-glucuronide, a compound found in the liverwort Marchantia berteroana. Hypolaetin 8-glucoside can be found in Sideritis leucantha.
