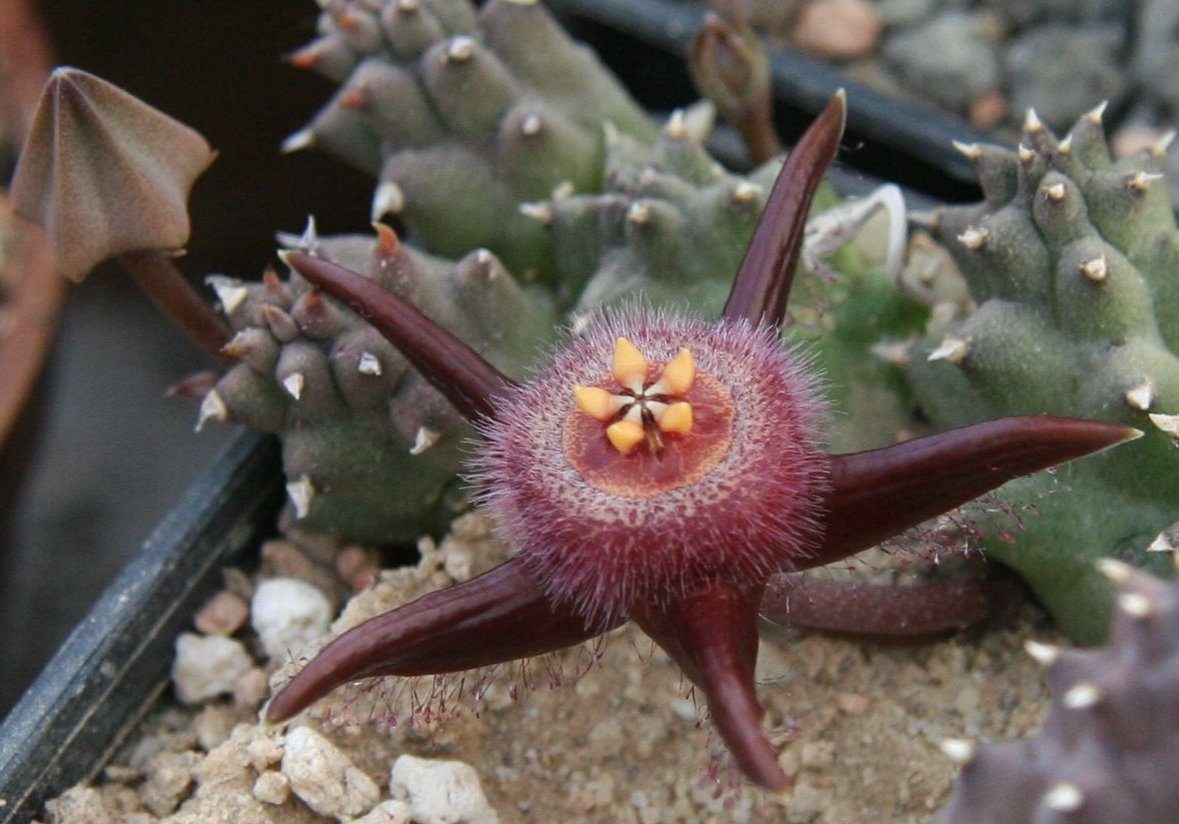
- Duvalia corderoyi

Scientific classification
- Kingdom: Plantae
- Clade: Tracheophytes
- Clade: Angiosperms
- Clade: Eudicots
- Clade: Asterids
- Order: Gentianales
- Family: Apocynaceae
- Subfamily: Asclepiadoideae
- Tribe: Ceropegieae
- Genus: Duvalia; Haw. 1812 not Bonpland 1813 nor Nees 1818

= Duvalia =

Genus of plants

Duvalia is a succulent plant genus in the subfamily Asclepiadoideae, in the family Apocynaceae (dogbane).

The genus was first described in 1812, named after the French physician and botanist Henri-Auguste Duval (1777-1814).

== Description ==
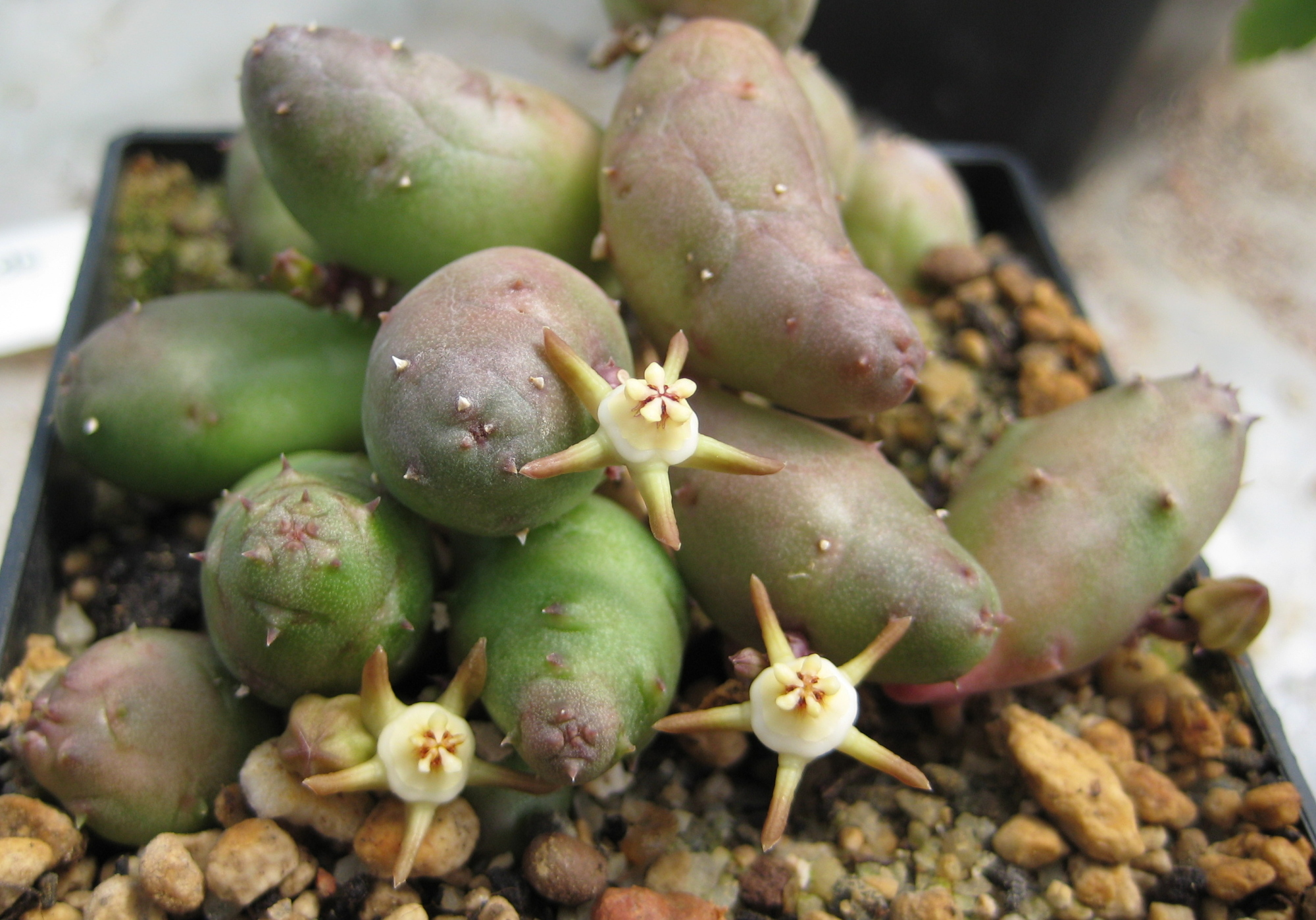
The rare Duvalia parviflora has smooth "potato-shaped" stems and tiny, cream-coloured flowers.

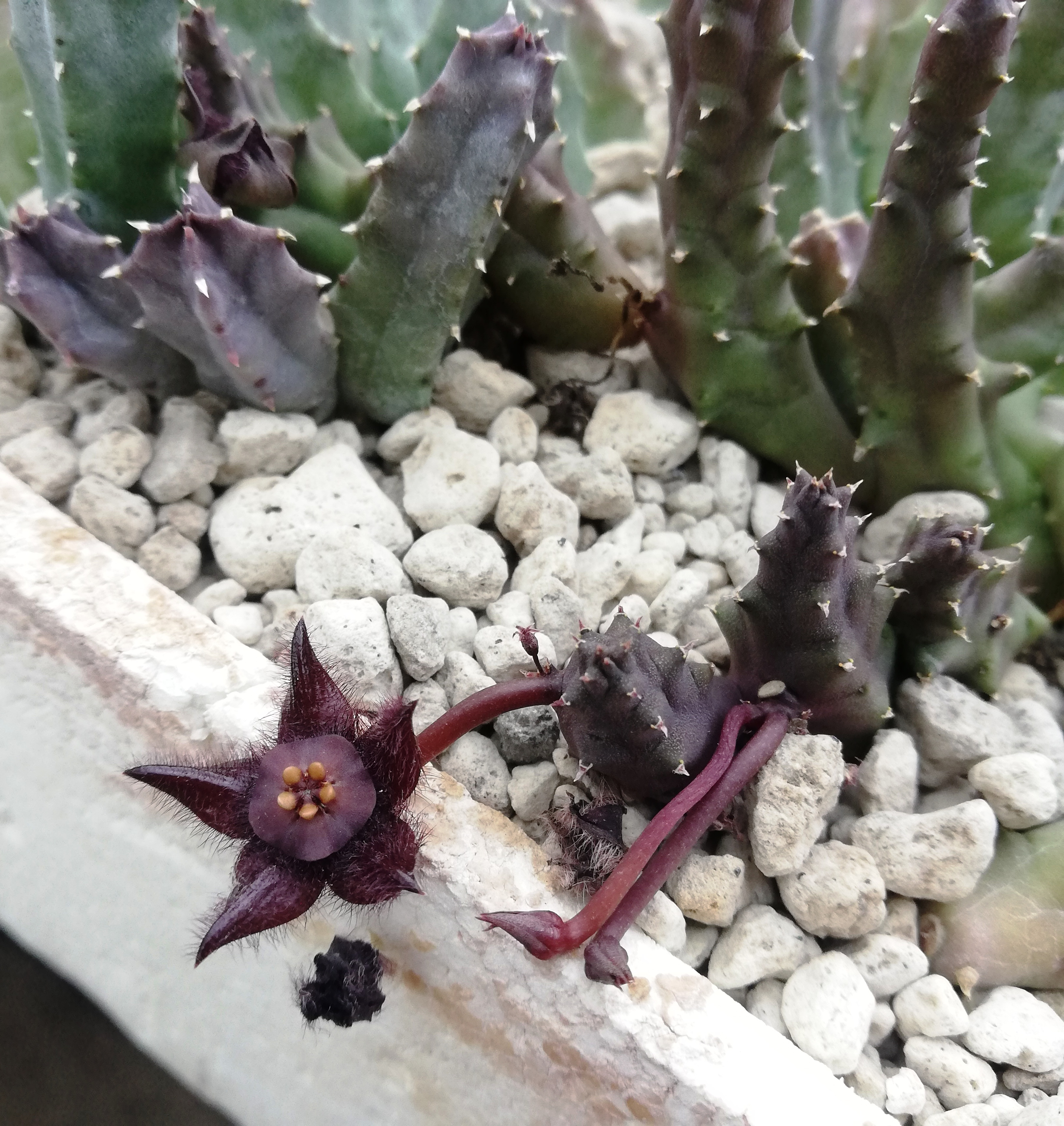
Duvalia elegans, the type species of the genus, showing its wider, triangular flower lobes.

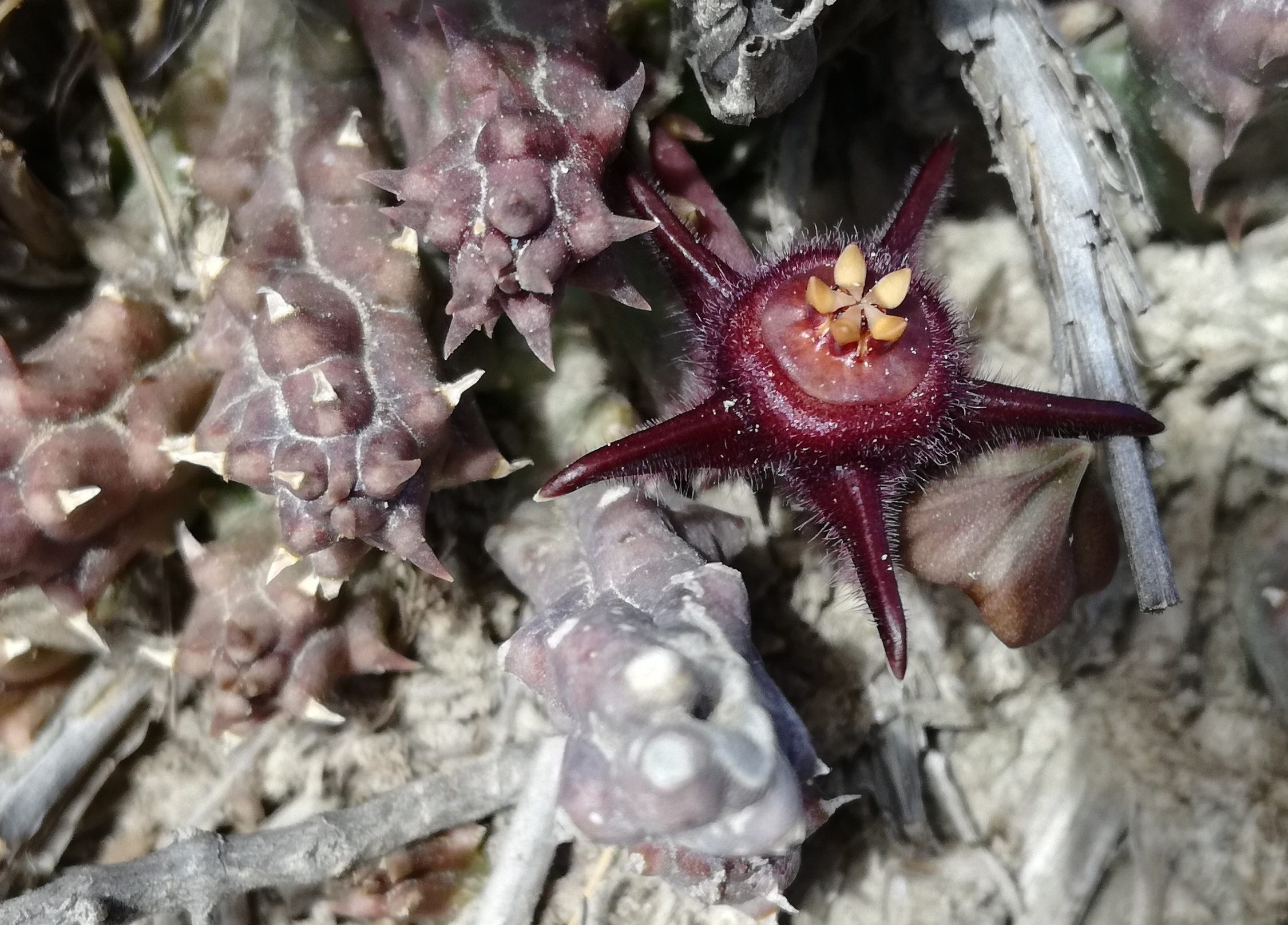
The hairy flowers of Duvalia vestita (Duvalia caespitosa subsp. vestita).

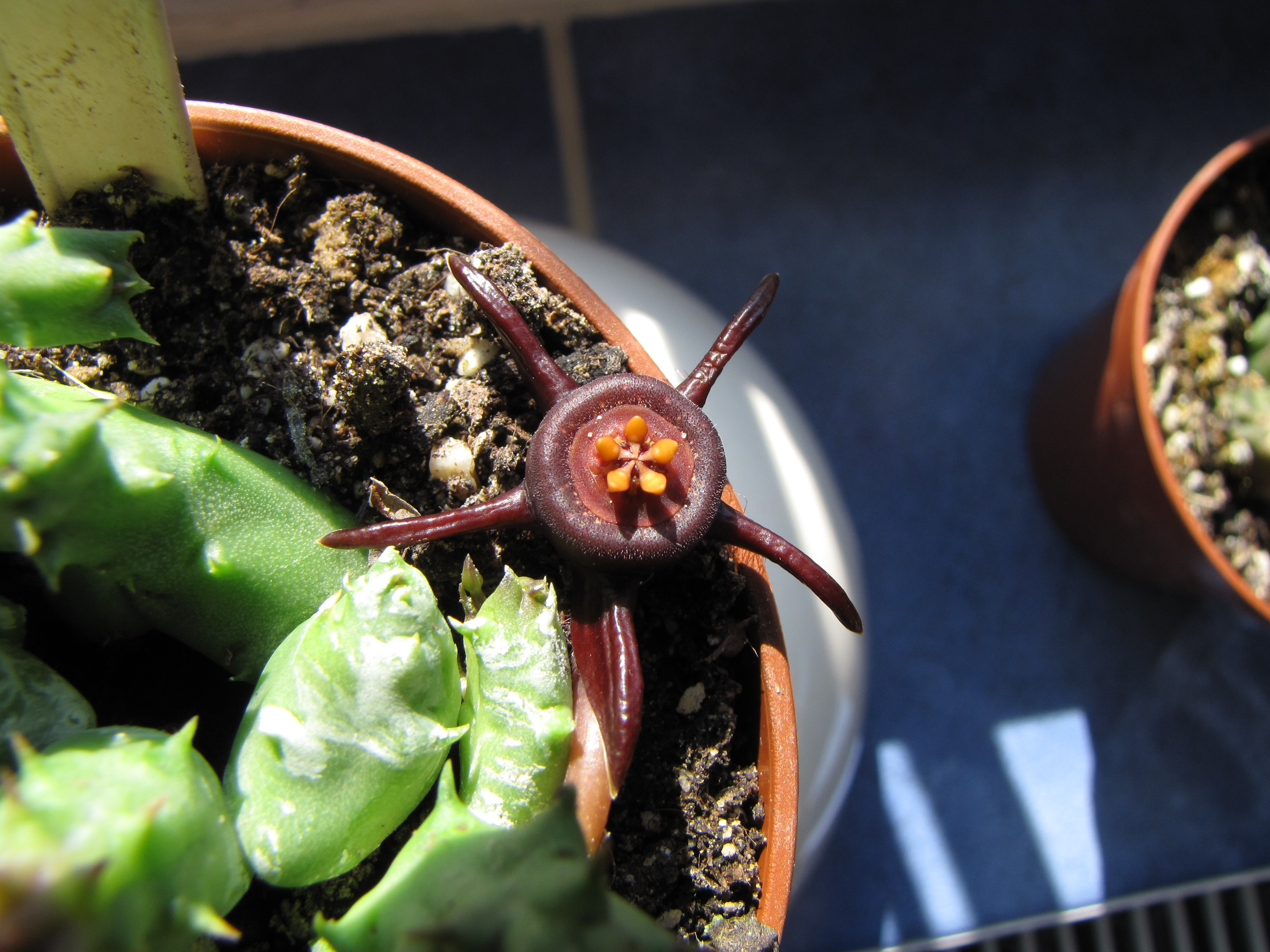
Duvalia caespitosa, one of the commonest and most widespread species, from the west of South Africa

=== Vegetative ===
The Duvalia species are succulent, perennial plants with low, planar growth. The stems are clavate, cylindrical to spherical, in cross-section four-, five-or six-edged, and to about 10 inches long. They can range from green, gray to mottled reddish in color.

The stems of some species, such as the rounded Duvalia parviflora, are distinctive, and these species can be identified even when not in flower. However the stems are very variable, and most Duvalia species can only be distinguished from each other when the flower is seen.

The stems are superficially very similar to those of the related genus Piaranthus, and the two are often confused when not in flower. In cross-section, Duvalia stems are sometimes five or six sided (Piaranthus stems are always four-sided in cross-section). To accurately distinguish them however, it is necessary to examine the flowers.

=== Floral ===
The distinctive flowers are on long, bare stalks, which grow from the base of the stems.

Each flower has five thin, elongated petal-like lobes, radiating in a star-shape, from a central raised disk or annulus.

The colour of most species flowers is shades of reddish brown, except for those of the rare Duvalia parviflora which are cream-coloured. The hermaphroditic flowers measure 1–5 cm in diameter, and have five parts. The crown is yellow ocher, brown, red to dark purple. The five corolla lobes are flat or folded along the middle nerve.

== Distribution ==
It occurs in southern Africa. The majority of the species are restricted to the western part of South Africa & Namibia, with the greatest number of species occurring in the Great Karoo region, on the edge of the winter rainfall area. Only one species, Duvalia polita extends further east, and as far north into tropical Africa as Malawi and Zambia.

Four species, occurring on the other side of the continent on the verges of the Red Sea, were formerly included in the genus Duvalia. However phylogenetic studies have shown them to be relatively unrelated to the rest of the genus, and more closely related to genus Ballyanthus Bruyns.

Species

1. Duvalia anemoniflora (Deflers) R.A. Dyer & Lavranos - Arabia
2. Duvalia angustiloba N.E.Br. - South Africa
3. Duvalia caespitosa (Masson) Haw. - South Africa
4. Duvalia corderoyi (Hook.f.) N.E.Br. - South Africa
5. Duvalia eilensis Lavranos - Somalia
6. Duvalia elegans (Masson) Haw. - Cape Province
7. Duvalia galgallensis Lavranos - Somalia
8. Duvalia gracilis Meve - Cape Province
9. Duvalia immaculata (C.A.Lückh.) M.B.Bayer ex L.C.Leach - South Africa
10. Duvalia maculata N.E.Br. - South Africa
11. Duvalia modesta N.E.Br. - South Africa
12. Duvalia parviflora N.E.Br. - Cape Province
13. Duvalia pillansii N.E.Br. - Cape Province
14. Duvalia polita N.E.Br. - South Africa
15. Duvalia pubescens N.E.Br. - Cape Province
16. Duvalia somalensis Lavranos - Somalia
17. Duvalia sulcata N.E.Br. - Arabia
18. Duvalia velutina Lavranos - Saudi Arabia
19. Duvalia vestita Meve - Cape Province

formerly included

transferred to Mannia

- Duvalia rupestris now Mannia rupestris
