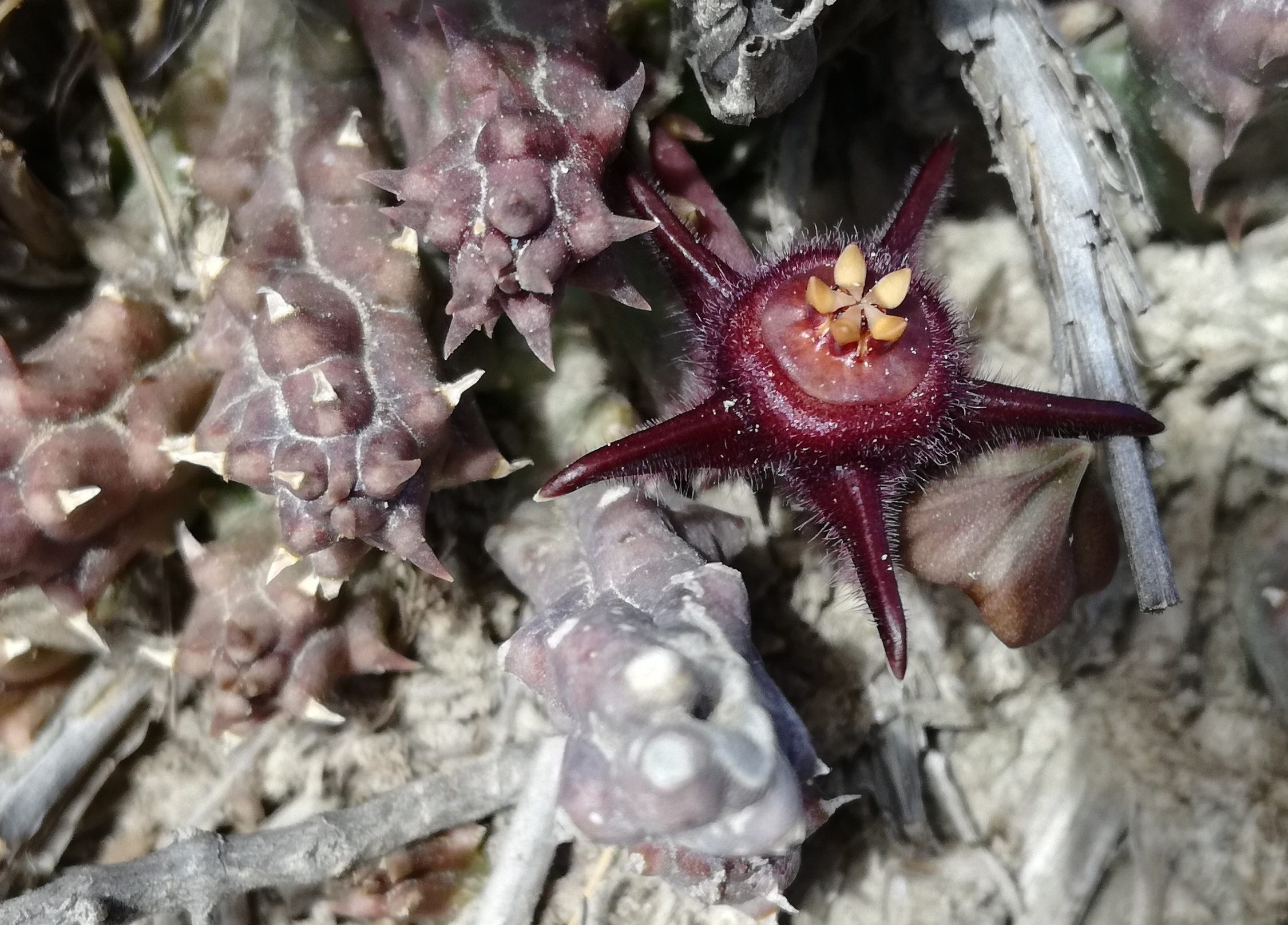
- The flower of Duvalia vestita, Malgas.

Scientific classification
- Kingdom: Plantae
- Clade: Tracheophytes
- Clade: Angiosperms
- Clade: Eudicots
- Clade: Asterids
- Order: Gentianales
- Family: Apocynaceae
- Genus: Duvalia
- Species: D. vestita

Binomial name
- Duvalia vestita Meve

= Duvalia vestita =

Species of plant

Duvalia vestita is a small succulent plant species, in the family Apocynaceae, indigenous to the southernmost part of the Western Cape Province, South Africa.

== Description ==
Duvalia vestita is sometimes considered to be a subspecies of D.caespitosa.

The flowers are 20-30mm in diameter, and are brownish-red to almost black. The central annulus is covered in short, dark hairs. The lobes are also hairy, at least near their bases where they are also slightly more spread out than typical Duvalia caespitosa. The margins of the lobes are not ciliate.

The stems are variable, but are sometimes slender and rhizomatous, like those of Duvalia immaculata. Individual stems are 5-22mm wide and 10-80mm long. The tiny (maximum 1mm) leaf-rudiments barely have stipular glands. When not in flower, D.vestita can resemble Orbea variegata, a species it often grows among.

Like D.caespitosa, D.vestita is a tetraploid. In appearance, it is somewhat intermediate between Duvalia caespitosa and Duvalia elegans, and might have originated as the product of hybridisation between these two species.

== Distribution ==
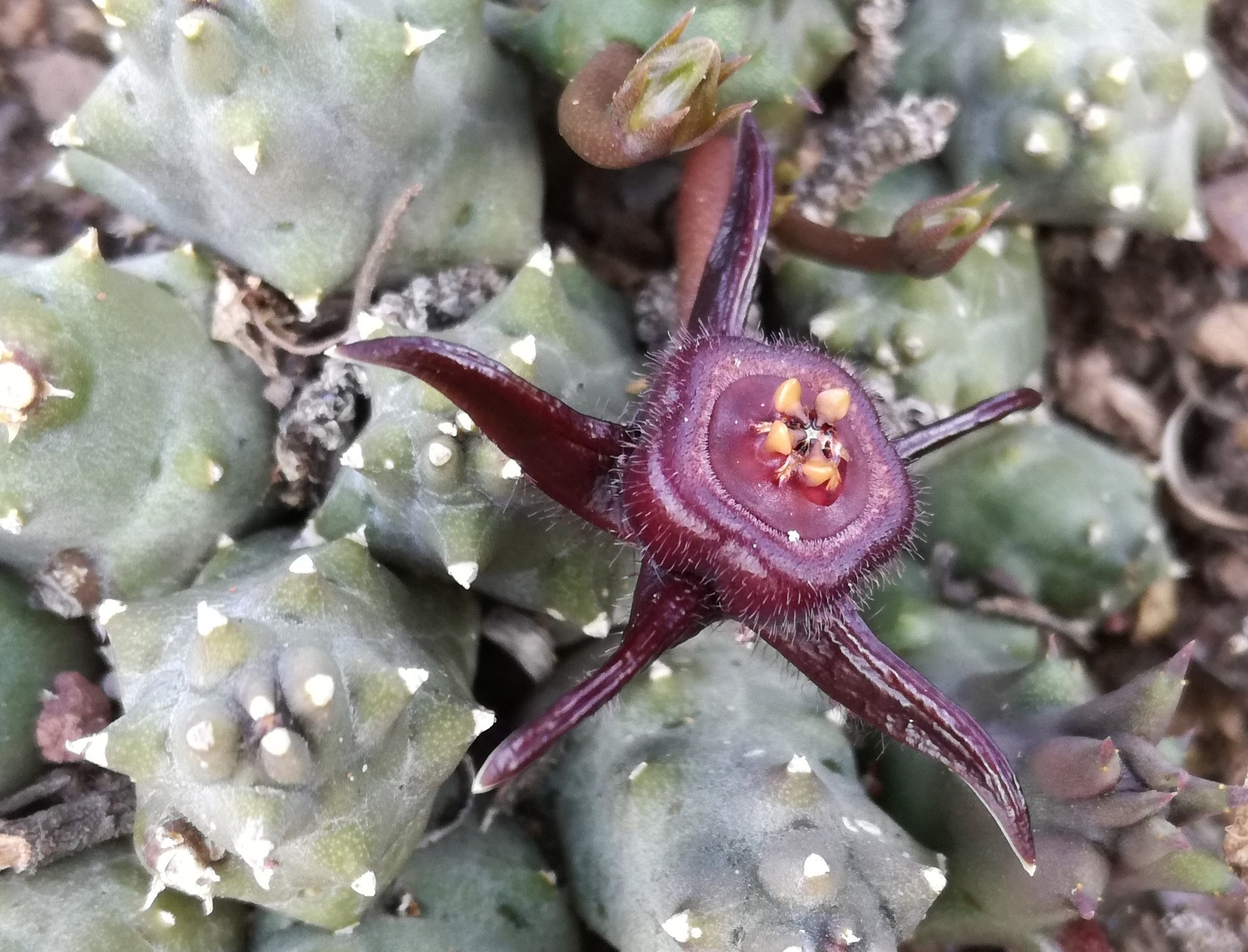
Intermediate form, between D.vestita and Duvalia caespitosa, from near Ashton

The distribution of D.vestita is in the far south of the Duvalia caespitosa range - mainly in the western Overberg region, south of the Langeberg mountains.

In the north west, D.vestita is rarely and doubtfully recorded from the Robertson Karoo (e.g. Ashton) and Breede River Valley. Here, it co-occurs with typical Duvalia caespitosa and with Duvalia elegans, and tends to merge with the typical Duvalia caespitosa.

The main part of the D.vestita distribution range is in the western Overberg (Stormsvlei, Greyton, Bredasdorp, Heuningsrug, Struisbaai, Malgas), where it co-occurs with Duvalia elegans. (The typical hairless-flowered Duvalia caespitosa does not occur in the Overberg) Towards the eastern Overberg (Heidelberg, Riversdale), it becomes indistinguishable from Duvalia elegans.

Its habitat is usually more rocky areas, with thin, low Fynbos vegetation. It often grows with Orbea variegata, on low shale or limestone slopes or rocky plains.
