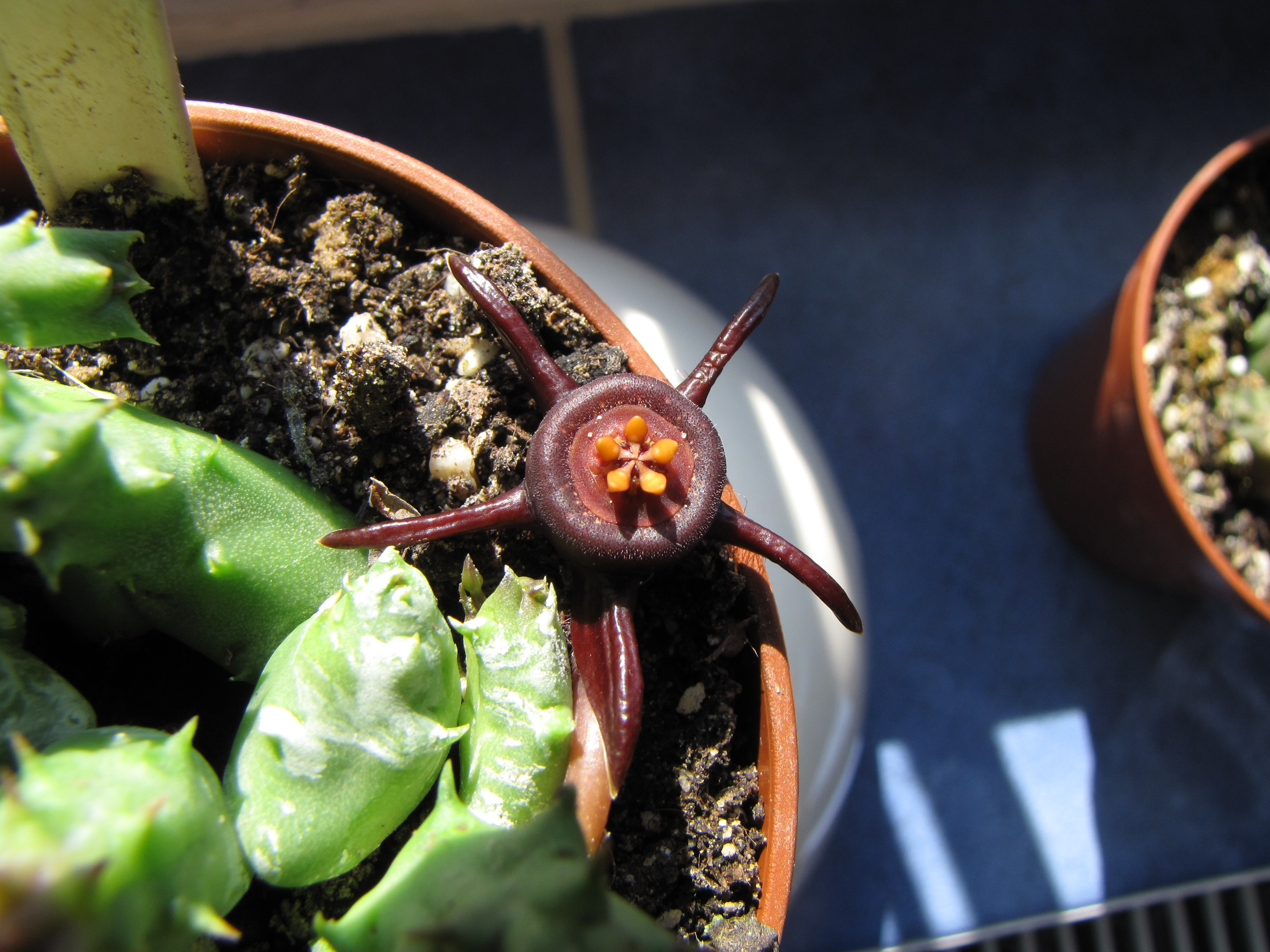
- The distinctive flower of Duvalia caespitosa

Conservation status
- Least Concern (IUCN 3.1)

Scientific classification
- Kingdom: Plantae
- Clade: Tracheophytes
- Clade: Angiosperms
- Clade: Eudicots
- Clade: Asterids
- Order: Gentianales
- Family: Apocynaceae
- Genus: Duvalia
- Species: D. caespitosa

Binomial name
- Duvalia caespitosa (Masson) Haw.

Varieties
- Duvalia caespitosa var. caespitosa; Duvalia caespitosa var. compacta (Haw.) Meve

Synonyms
- Ceropegia caespitosa (Masson) Bruyns; Stapelia caespitosa Masson (1797) (basionym); Stisseria caespitosa (Masson) Kuntze

= Duvalia caespitosa =

Species of plant

Duvalia caespitosa is a species of flowering plant in the family Apocynaceae. It is a small succulent subshrub native to the Cape Provinces and Free State of South Africa and to southern Lesotho.

== Description ==
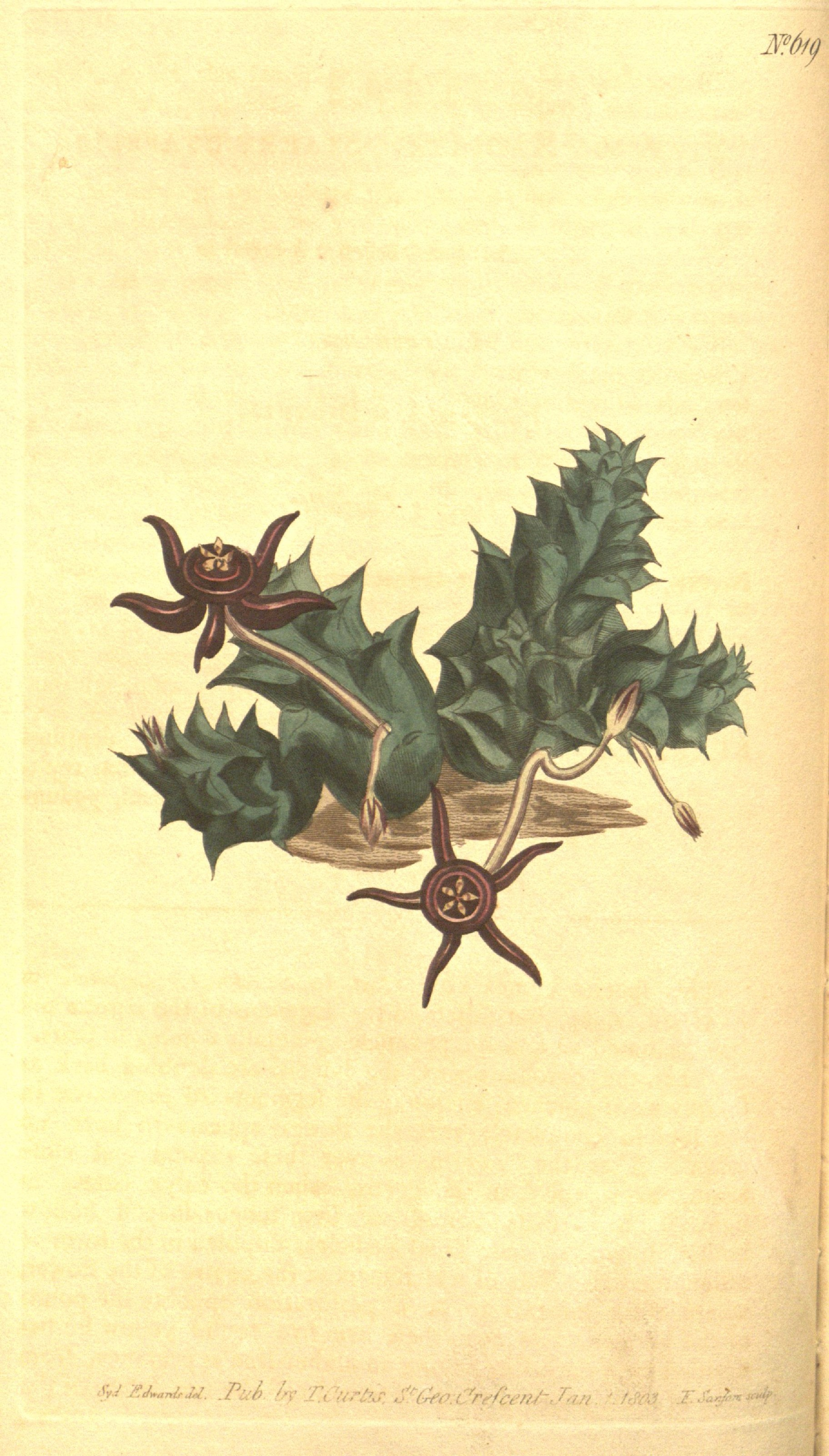
Botanical illustration of Duvalia caespitosa

This species is recognised by its flower, which is held on a short stalk from the lower part of the stem. Like all Duvalia species, the D.caespitosa flower has five radiating corolla lobes (petals) that each have their sides folded down longitudinally.

However, the lobes of D. caespitosa flowers are tightly folded, and therefore appear thin and spike-like. They are matte or sometimes slightly glossy.

In D. caespitosa, the raised annulus in the centre of the flower is also very prominent, and is hairless or only very faintly pubescent. The annulus is usually a dark red-brown, but is yellow and spotted around the edge of the corona disc. The central corona disc is usually a dull red-brown, but can sometimes be pale. It is smaller than the annulus, revealing the top of latter around its circumference.

=== subsp. vestita ===
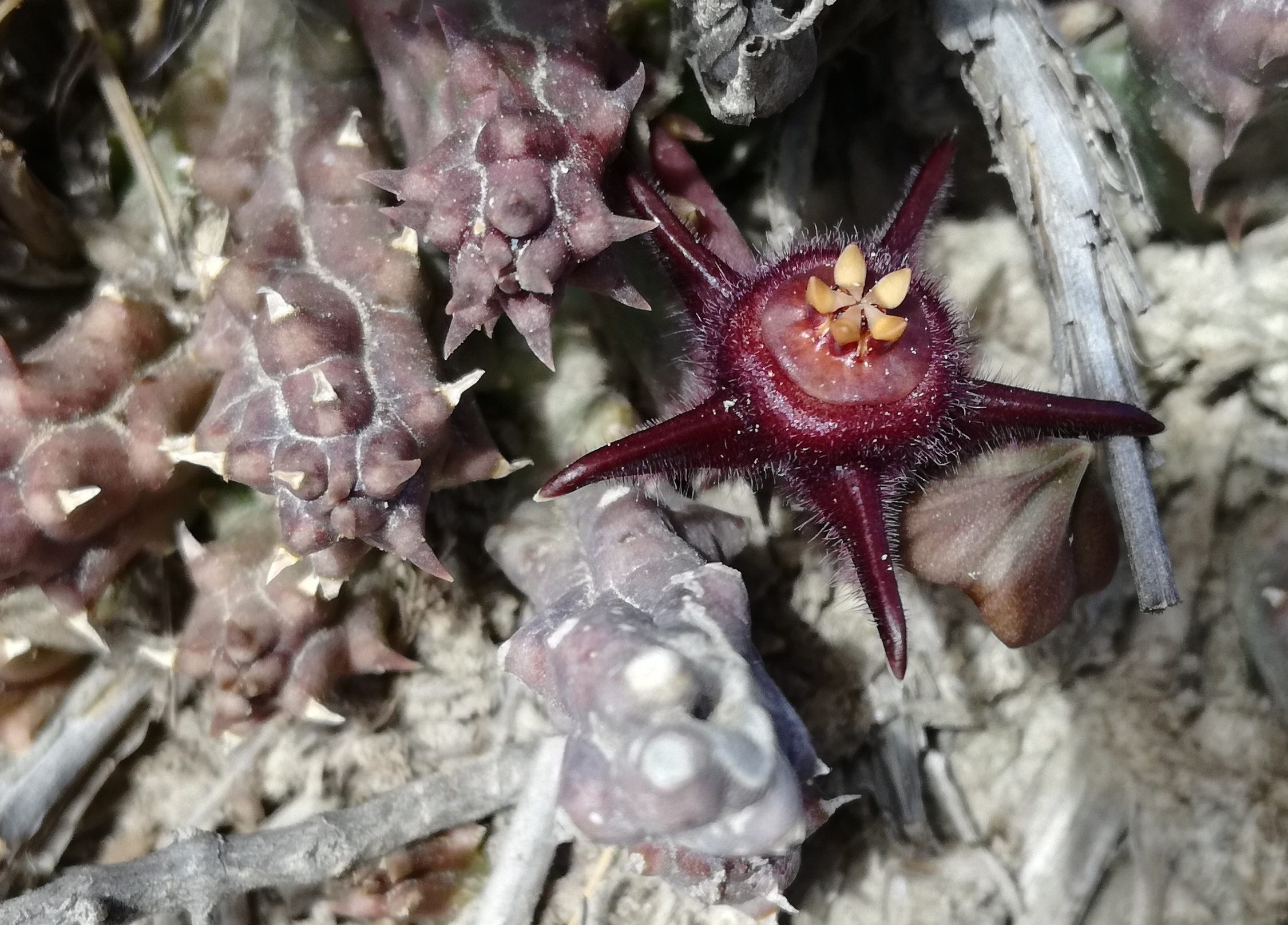
Duvalia vestita is sometimes treated as a subspecies of D. caespitosa.

Duvalia vestita is sometimes considered to be a subspecies of D. caespitosa. It has lobes that are slightly more spread out. The Corolla is noticeably hairy and very dark red (almost black).

The distribution of vestita is in the far south of the D. caespitosa range - mainly in the western Overberg region, south of the Langeberg mountains.

Duvalia vestita is rarely recorded from the Robertson Karoo and Breede River Valley. Here, it co-occurs with typical D.caespitosa and with Duvalia elegans, and tends to merge with the typical D. caespitosa.

It also extends south into the western Overberg (Greyton, Bredasdorp, Wiesdrift, Struisbaai, Malgas), where it co-occurs with Duvalia elegans. (The typical hairless-flowered D. caespitosa does not occur in the Overberg)
