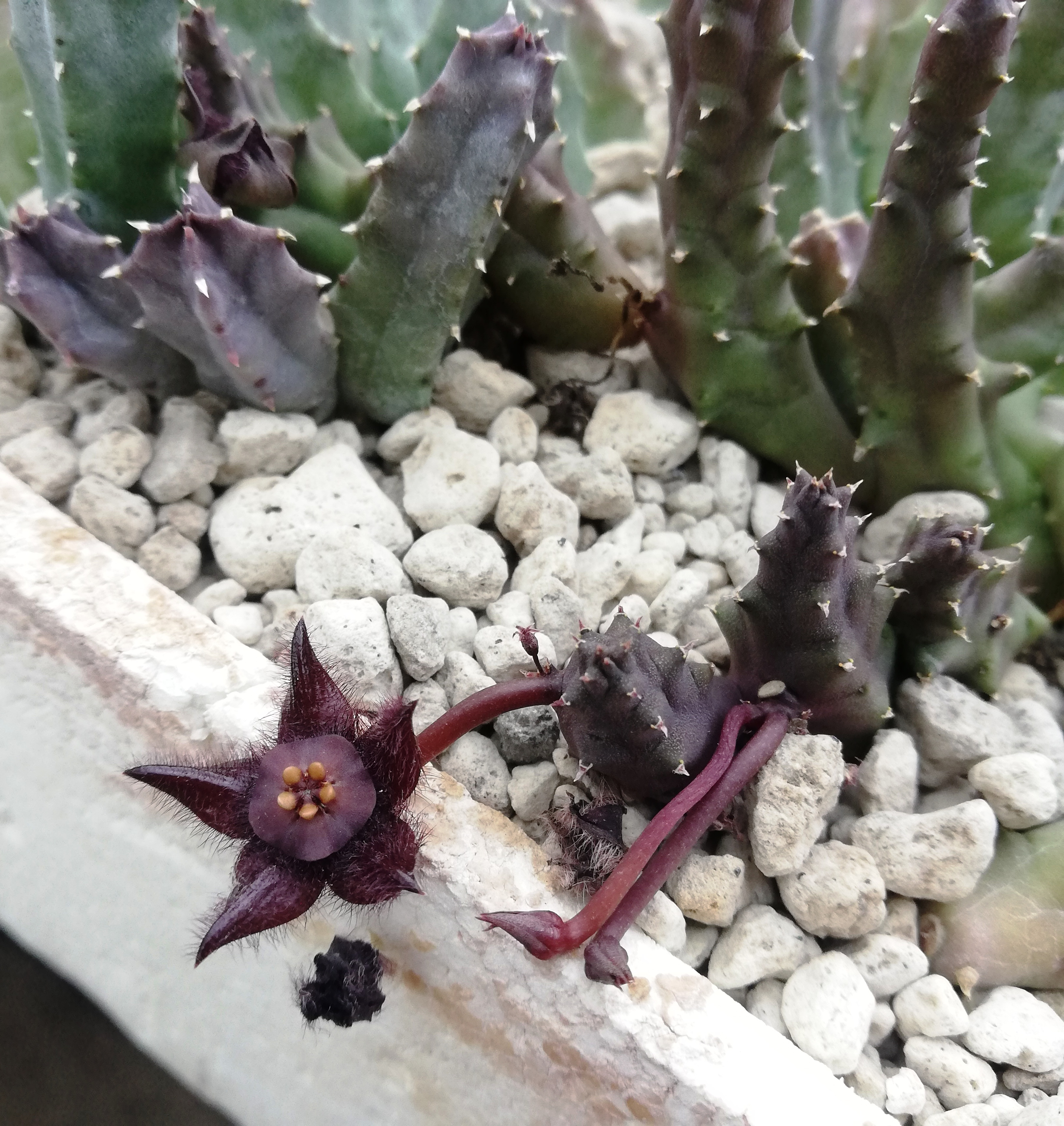
- The distinctive flowers of Duvalia elegans

Conservation status
- Vulnerable (IUCN 3.1)

Scientific classification
- Kingdom: Plantae
- Clade: Tracheophytes
- Clade: Angiosperms
- Clade: Eudicots
- Clade: Asterids
- Order: Gentianales
- Family: Apocynaceae
- Genus: Duvalia
- Species: D. elegans

Binomial name
- Duvalia elegans (Masson) Haw.

= Duvalia elegans =

Species of plant

Duvalia elegans (the "elegant Duvalia") is a small succulent plant species, in the family Apocynaceae. It is the type species of the genus Duvalia, and it is endemic to the Western Cape Province, South Africa.

== Description ==
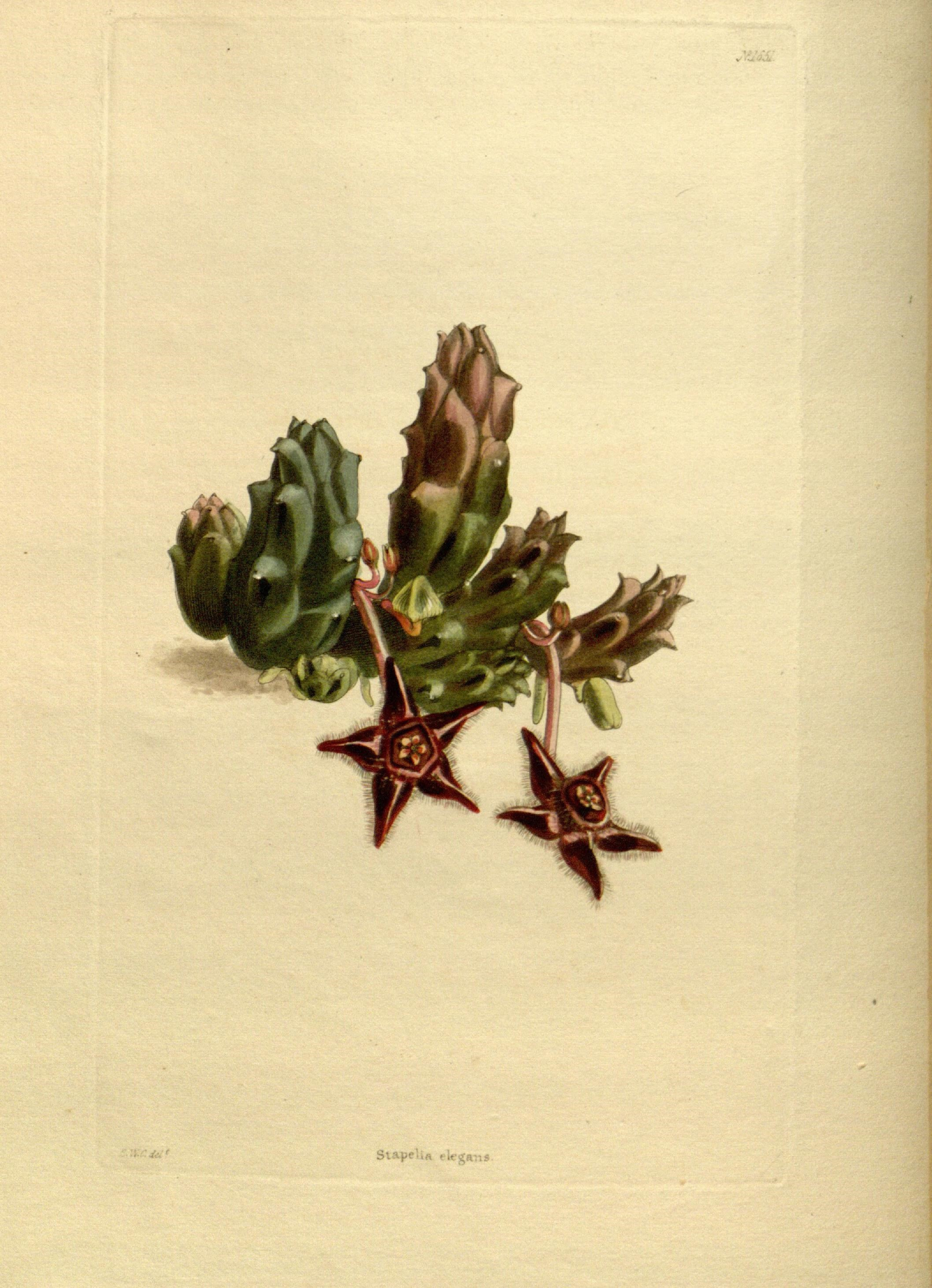
Botanical illustration of Duvalia elegans

This species closely resembles the widespread and common Duvalia caespitosa, and the two species often grow alongside each other within the Breede River Valley.

However, the flowers of Duvalia elegans are smaller (15-22mm diameter) and distinctive. Their five radiating corolla-tips are very dark brown-purple, glossy and usually densely hairy. The shape of the corolla-tips is slightly triangular, because their margins are spread out, and only slightly reflexed (not tightly folded down, replicate, like those of most Duvalia species).

The centre of the flower is covered by a prominent, flat coronal disc, which is not glossy, and is often a lighter colour.

The flowers are usually held out on long stalks that grow from the base of each stem, and the flower itself tends to lie on the ground, face-upwards.

Vegetatively they are usually indistinguishable from Duvalia caespitosa. D.elegans stems are sometimes slightly smaller, more slender, more cylindrical and spread out from each other more diffusely. Their leaf rudiments are often slightly longer (1-1.5mm), but these are not reliable characteristics.

Unlike some of its relatives (e.g. D.caespitosa or vestita), D.elegans is a diploid species.

== Distribution ==
This species is indigenous to the Western Cape Province, South Africa, where it occurs at an altitude of 150–400 meters. It occurs in the Breede River Valley, from Robertson and Ashton, to Montagu, southwards to Drew, Stormsvlei and Swellendam. In the Overberg region to the south, it occurs around Heidelberg and as far east as the area around Riversdale, often co-occurring with Euphorbia tridentata.

Its natural habitat is under bushes, in succulent-rich renosterveld vegetation, on gravelly (often shale-derived) soils.
