= Ballyanthus =

Scientific classification
- Kingdom: Plantae
- Clade: Tracheophytes
- Clade: Angiosperms
- Clade: Eudicots
- Clade: Asterids
- Order: Gentianales
- Family: Apocynaceae
- Genus: Ballyanthus; Bruyns

Genus of flowering plants

Ballyanthus is a genus of flowering plants belonging to the family Apocynaceae.

Its native range is Somalia.

Species:

- Ballyanthus major Plowes
- Ballyanthus prognathus (P.R.O.Bally) Bruyns
