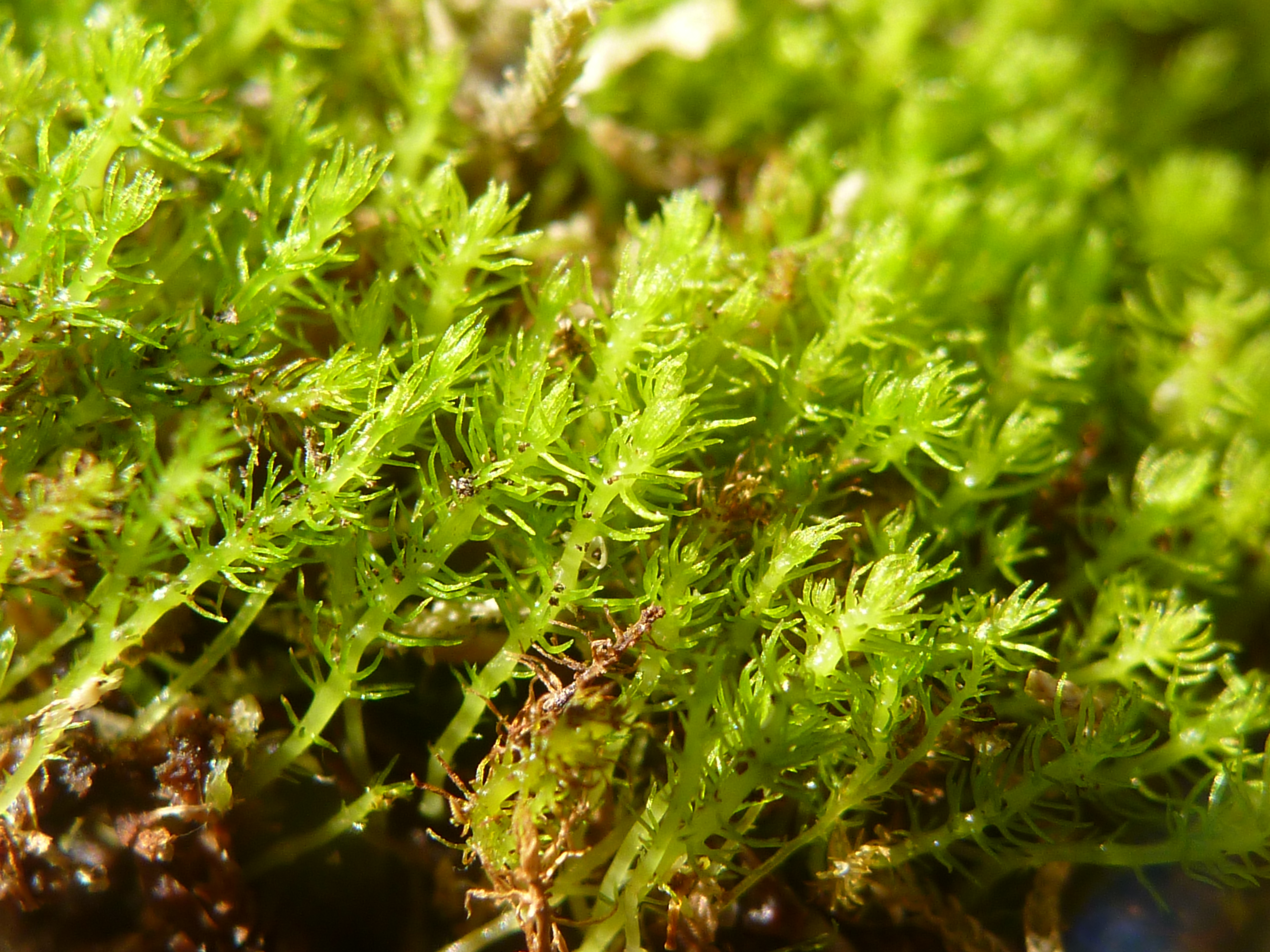
- Takakia lepidoziodes on a damp slope above Takakia Lake, Haida Gwaii

Scientific classification
- Kingdom: Plantae
- Division: Bryophyta
- Subdivision: Takakiophytina
- Class: Takakiopsida
- Order: Takakiales
- Family: Takakiaceae
- Genus: Takakia
- Species: T. lepidozioides

Binomial name
- Takakia lepidozioides S. Hatt. & Inoue

= Takakia lepidozioides =

Species of moss

Takakia lepidozioides is a species of moss in the Takakiaceae family, one of two species of Takakia.

== Description ==
It is characterized by its tiny bifid leaves in which each segment is only a few cells wide, conspicuous rhizomous shoots, and long leafless stolon shoots which facilitate the colonization of bare areas. A very unusual feature is the lack of male plants within the species, which are thought to have become extinct during an ice age. Takakia lepidozioides have been found to be a highly adaptive moss. Over the past 65 million years, there have been extreme changes in the climate, however, several molecular adaptations have been observed in this species.
