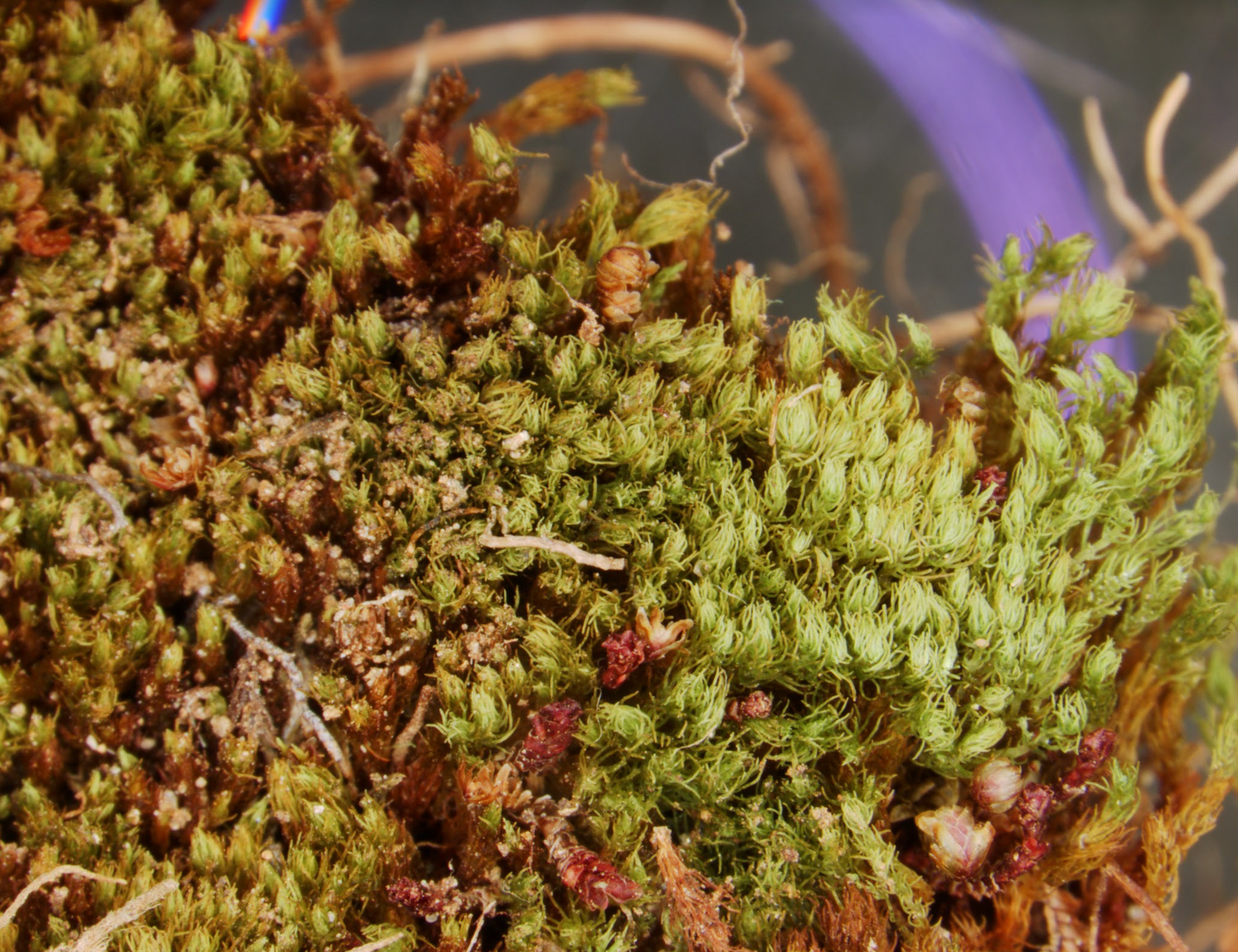
- Dried specimen of Takakia ceratophylla

Conservation status
- Vulnerable (IUCN 2.3)

Scientific classification
- Kingdom: Plantae
- Division: Bryophyta
- Subdivision: Takakiophytina
- Class: Takakiopsida
- Order: Takakiales
- Family: Takakiaceae
- Genus: Takakia
- Species: T. ceratophylla

Binomial name
- Takakia ceratophylla (Mitt.) Grolle

Synonyms
- Lepidozia ceratophylla Mitt.

= Takakia ceratophylla =

Species of moss

Takakia ceratophylla is one of the two species of toothless mosses in the genus Takakia, under the Takakiaceae family. This species was first described by William Mitten in 1861. Takakia ceratophylla is vulnerable and threatened by habitat loss due to human activities.

== Description ==
Takakia ceratophylla was first described as a liverwort under the genus Lepidozia for nearly a century. Later rediscovered in Japan and claimed to be sharing traits from both the liverworts and mosses based on genetic sequences and morphological characters.

Some features that are similar to mosses include the presence of columella, tapered foot, and calyptra; the elongation and twisting of the seta; and the absence of elaters. Whereas structures such as rhizoids, stomata in sporangium, operculum and peristome teeth are not differentiated in this species.

== Geographic range and habitat ==
Takakia ceratophylla is terrestrial and can be found in China, India, Nepal, and the United States. The natural habitats for this species are rocky areas (eg. inland or mountain cliffs) and cold desert that experiences late snow cover. The species can be found at low to moderate elevations (70–700 m).

== Morphology ==
=== Gametophytes ===
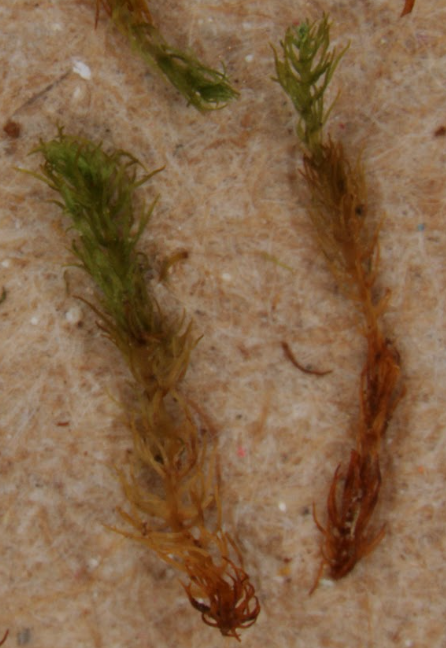
Gametophytes of Takakia ceratophylla

The shoots of the gametophyte are rigid and green, the distal part of the shoots are caducous, which contributes to the asexual reproduction mechanism of the species. The dried specimens do not contain odour.

The tapered and deeply-lobed leaves of Takakia ceratophylla are irregularly spiral arranged and contain simple oil droplets and axillary hairs. The leaves are multitratose, and composed of 13-20 thick-walled cells. The unique colourless intercalary rhizomatous branches functions to produce new stems and shoots.

The reproduction structure of the stalked antheridia and the lageniform archegonia are moss-like, and can be found buried in between the leaves on the lateral side of the stem. The stem of Takakia ceratophylla is composed of cuticles and contains a weak conducting strand.

=== Sporophytes ===
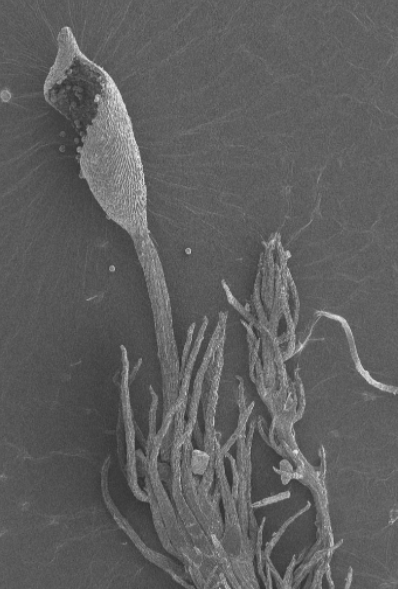
Sporophytes of Takakia ceratophylla

The sporangium of Takakia ceratophylla is protected by a small hood-like calyptra. The thickness of the calyptra gradually thins down from the apex towards the base. The seta and capsules are initially green, gradually turning into brown or black colour, and elongate or expand prior to the maturation of the sporangium. The long-tapered foot is responsible for transferring nutrients from the gametophyte toward the sporophyte. And a well-defined conducting strand that contains hydroids continues from the seta and into the foot.

The capsule expands and swells during development, in consequence, a spiral suture line called capsule dehiscence becomes evident by breaking down of the dextrorsely-arranged exothecial cells on the outer cell wall. The separation begins from the middle of the capsule and extend towards the apex and base. The amphithecium gives rise to the capsule wall, while the endothecium gives rise to the archesporium and the dome-shaped columella, where the cells of the columella and spore sac break down during spore maturation.

Takakia ceratophylla is hygroscopic and depends on passive spore release. The spores production site is located in the inner space of the capsule. During spore release, the seta twists toward the right direction and the capsule dehiscence widens and becomes flattened, such that the spores can pass through the split and disperse over time. The wideness of the capsule dehiscence depends on the age and dryness of the outer cells.
