= Solenostoma speciosum =

Conservation status
- Vulnerable (IUCN 2.3)

Scientific classification
- Kingdom: Plantae
- Division: Marchantiophyta
- Class: Jungermanniopsida
- Order: Jungermanniales
- Family: Solenostomataceae
- Genus: Solenostoma
- Species: S. speciosum

Binomial name
- Solenostoma speciosum (Horik.) Hentschel, K.Feldberg, D.G.Long, Váňa, Heinrichs & Bombosch

Synonyms
- Anastrophyllum speciosum Horik.; Scaphophyllum speciosum (Horik.) Inoue; Jungermannia speciosa (Horik.) N.Kitag.

Species of liverwort

Solenostoma speciosum is a species of liverwort in the family Solenostomataceae. It is found in Bhutan, China, Nepal, and Taiwan. Its natural habitats are temperate forests and subtropical or tropical dry forests. It is threatened by habitat loss.

== Taxonomy ==
The species was originally described as Anastrophyllum speciosum by Yoshiwo Horikawa in 1934. It was later transferred to the genus Scaphophyllum by Hikino Inoue, where it remained as the sole species in that monospecific genus. In 2009, molecular phylogenetic studies by Feldberg and colleagues using chloroplast DNA rbcL gene sequences demonstrated that Scaphophyllum was actually nested within the genus Solenostoma. The species is distinguished by its canoe-shaped, strongly concave leaves and loosely to densely ciliate stem surface – characteristics that had previously led Rudolf M. Schuster to place it in its own subfamily Scaphophylloideae. However, Jiří Váňa had earlier noted striking similarities between this species and several members of what was then Jungermannia (now classified as Solenostoma). Based on both molecular evidence and morphological similarities, the species was formally transferred to Solenostoma in 2009, along with its subspecies S. speciosum subsp. villosum.

== Description ==
The reproductive structures of S. speciosum were first documented in specimens from Yunnan, China. The male reproductive organs (androecia) grow along the stem rather than at its tips. They are arranged in 5–6 pairs of closely spaced, slightly pouched protective leaves (bracts).

== Habitat, distribution, and ecology ==
The species has been recorded from Taiwan (in five localities), Yunnan (China), Bhutan (one locality), and East Nepal. Two subspecies are recognised: subsp. speciosum which occurs in Taiwan, and subsp. villosum which is found in the Himalayan region (including Bhutan, Nepal) and likely also in Yunnan.

In Taiwan, S. speciosum occurs on forest floors at elevations between 2,000–2,400 m (6,600–7,900 ft) above sea level. In Bhutan, it has been found growing on damp mossy logs in shady ravines within wet mixed broad-leaved forest. In Yunnan, it has been documented at higher elevations of 2,732 m (8,963 ft) in undisturbed wet mossy forests dominated by hemlock (Tsuga) and rhododendron trees, where it grows on wet, mossy surfaces of large boulders along streams.

The species is considered vulnerable according to IUCN Red List criteria, with an area of occupancy less than 2,000 km^{2} (770 sq mi) across fewer than ten localities. Its habitat is declining, primarily due to logging and wood harvesting activities that lead to ecosystem degradation.
