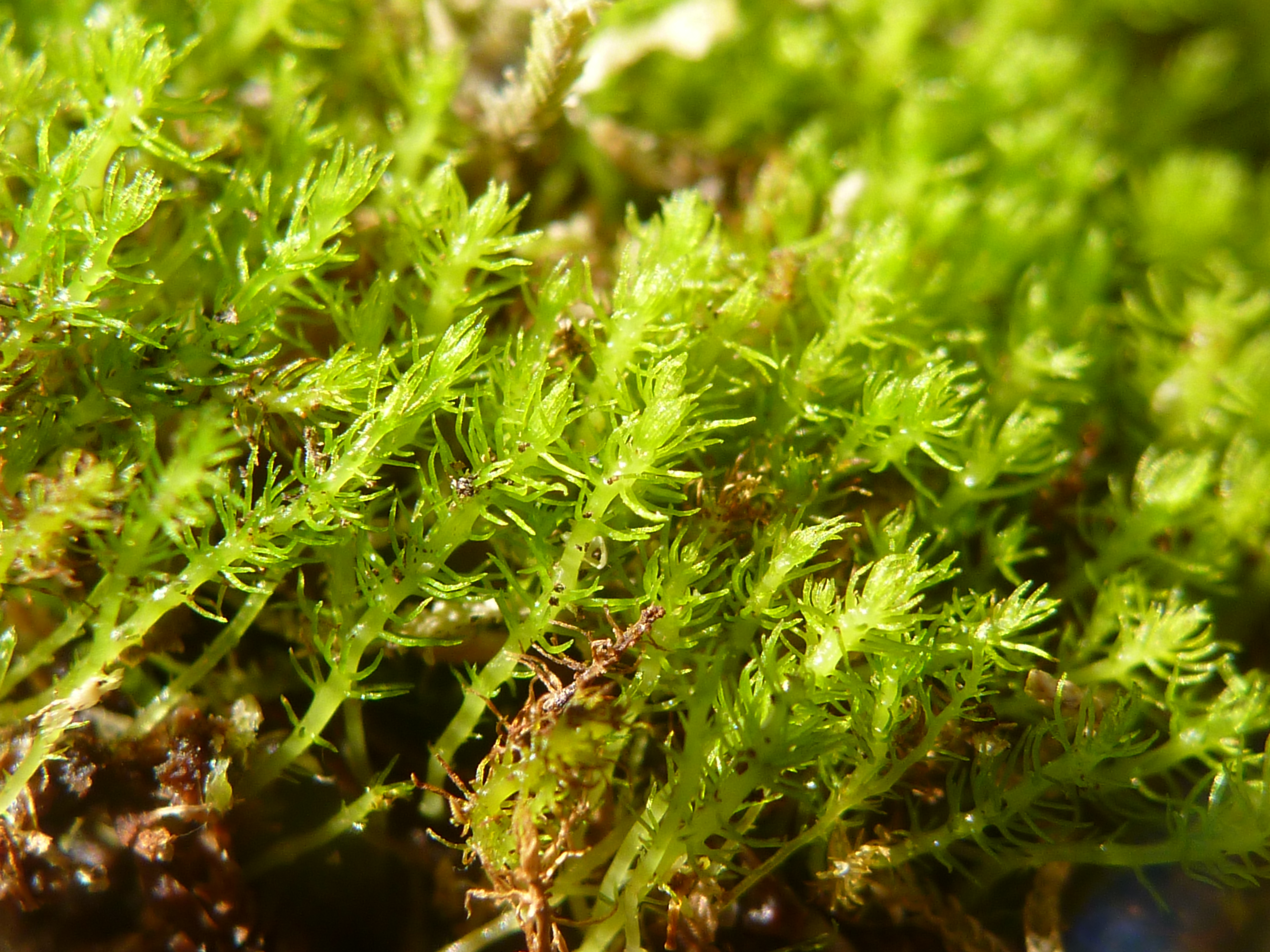
- Takakia lepidoziodes on a damp slope above Takakia Lake, Haida Gwaii

Scientific classification
- Kingdom: Plantae
- Clade: Embryophytes
- Division: Bryophyta
- Subdivision: Takakiophytina
- Class: Takakiopsida; Stech & W. Frey
- Order: Takakiales; Stech & W. Frey
- Family: Takakiaceae; Stech & W. Frey
- Genus: Takakia; S. Hatt. & Inoue

Species
- T. ceratophylla T. lepidozioides

= Takakia =

Takakia Temporal range: Middle Devonian–Present

Genus of mosses

Takakia is a genus of two species of mosses known from western North America and central and eastern Asia. The genus is placed as a separate family, order and class among the mosses.

== Discovery ==
Takakia was discovered in the Himalayas and described by William Mitten in 1861. It was originally described simply as a new liverwort species (Lepidozia ceratophylla) within an existing genus, and it was thus long overlooked. The discovery of similar odd plants in the mid-20th century by Dr. Noriwo Takaki (1915–2006) in Japan sparked more interest. The many unusual features of these plants led to the establishment in 1958 of the species Takakia lepidozioides, in a new genus Takakia, named to honor the man who rediscovered it and recognized its unique characteristics. The species originally described by Mitten was subsequently recognized by Grolle as belonging to this new genus, and accordingly renamed Takakia ceratophylla.

All of the plants originally collected lacked any reproductive structures; they were sterile gametophyte plants. Eventually, plants with archegonia were found, which resembled the archegonia found in mosses. Fertile plants bearing antheridia and sporophytes were first reported in 1993 from the Aleutian Islands, and both structures were clearly of the form found in primitive mosses. This discovery established Takakia as a genus of moss, albeit an unusual one.

In Asia, Takakia has since been found in Sikkim (in the Himalayas), North Borneo, Taiwan, and Japan. In North America, the genus is found in the Aleutian Islands and British Columbia. It occurs in a variety of local habitats, from bare rock, to moist humus, and grows at elevations ranging from sea level to the subalpine.

== Description ==
Takakia is the oldest known extant genus of land plants, estimated to have branched off the other mosses around 390 million years ago. The genus also has the highest number of fast-evolving genes of any moss. They secrete a microbe-harboring mucilage to establish a diverse microbiome containing microbes associated with nitrogen fixation and mycorrhiza. The plant's Japanese name (nanjamonja-goke) "impossible moss" reflects this. It was believed to have the lowest known chromosome count (n=4) per cell of any land plant, but some plants of the small Australian daisy Brachyscome dichromosomatica are now known to have a count of n=2.

From a distance, Takakia looks like a typical layer of moss or green algae on the rock where it grows. On closer inspection, tiny shoots of Takakia grow from a turf of slender, creeping rhizomes. The green shoots which grow up from the turf are seldom taller than 1 cm, and bear an irregular arrangement of short, finger-like leaves (1 mm long). These leaves are deeply divided into two or more filaments, a characteristic not found in any other moss. Both the green shoots and their leaves are very brittle.

Unlike in other bryophytes, the egg-producing archegonia and sperm-producing antheridia are not surrounded by perichaetial leaves or other protective tissues. Instead, the gametangia are naked in the angle formed between the stem and the vegetative leaves. The sporophyte develops a long stalk ending in an elongated spore capsule. The capsule contains a central columella over and around which the spores are produced. When the sporophyte is mature, the capsule ruptures along a single spiral slit to release the spores.

In the year 2023 the complete genome sequence of Takakia lepidozioides from Tibet was deciphered. It faces extinction due to climate change.

== Classification ==
family Takakiaceae

genus Takakia

Takakia ceratophylla (Mitt.) Grolle
Takakia lepidozioides S. Hatt. & Inoue.

- - Takakia
  - Sphagnopsida
  - - - Andreaeopsida
      - Andreaeobryopsida
      - - Oedipodiopsida
        - - Tetraphidopsida
          - Polytrichopsida
          - Bryopsida

The classification of Takakia, and its phylogenetic position among the mosses.
