= Hiroshi Inoue =

Hiroshi Inoue or Inoue Hiroshi may refer to:

- Hiroshi Inoue (entomologist) 井上寛 (1917–2008), Japanese lepidopterist
- Hiroshi Inoue (bryologist) 井上浩 (1932–1989), Japanese botanist
