= Andreaeobryum =

Scientific classification
- Kingdom: Plantae
- Division: Bryophyta
- Class: Andreaeobryopsida; Goffinet & W.R.Buck
- Order: Andreaeobryales; B.M.Murray
- Family: Andreaeobryaceae; Steere & B.M.Murray
- Genus: Andreaeobryum; Steere & B.M.Murray
- Species: A. macrosporum

Binomial name
- Andreaeobryum macrosporum Steere & B.M.Murray

Genus of moss with single species

Andreaeobryum is a genus of moss with a single species Andreaeobryum macrosporum, endemic to Alaska and western Canada. The genus is placed as a separate family, order and class among the mosses.

class Andreaeobryopsida

order Andreaeobryales

family Andreaeobraceae

Andreaeobryum

- - Takakiopsida
  - Sphagnopsida
  - - - Andreaeopsida
      - Andreaeobryum
      - - Oedipodiopsida
        - - Tetraphidopsida
          - Polytrichopsida
          - Bryopsida

The phylogenetic position of Andreaeobryum among the eight classes of mosses, based on inferences from DNA sequence data.
