= Bryophyta =

Bryophyta may refer to:

- Bryophytes – Bryophyta sensu lato (in the broad sense); a group of plants regarded as a single division by some, but further split into:
  - Mosses – Bryophyta sensu stricto (in the strict sense); a specific group of leafy nonvascular plants, now regarded as Division Bryophyta
  - hornworts (Anthocerotophyta)
  - liverworts (Marchantiophyta)
