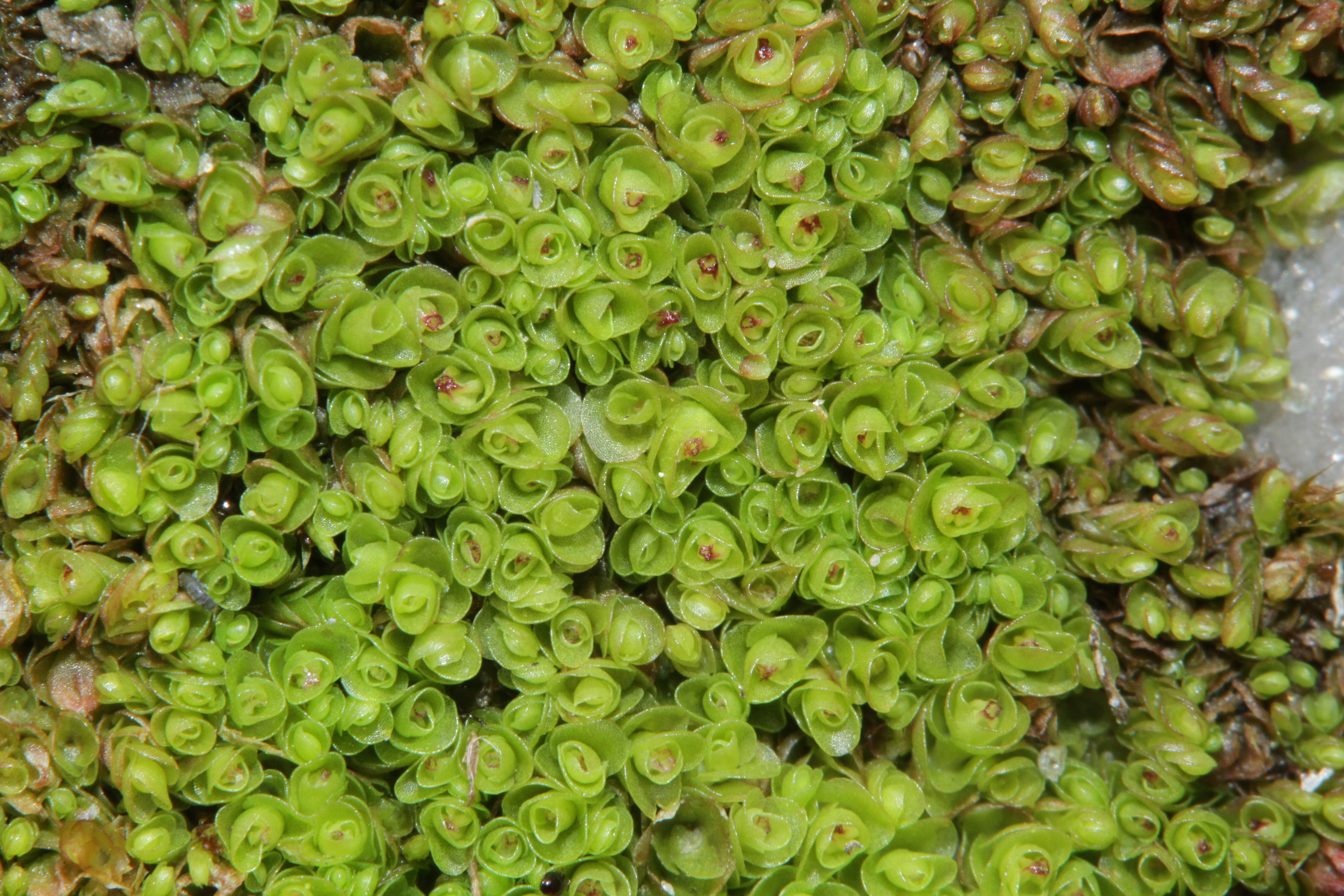
- Solenostoma confertissimum

Scientific classification
- Kingdom: Plantae
- Division: Marchantiophyta
- Class: Jungermanniopsida
- Order: Jungermanniales
- Family: Solenostomataceae
- Genus: Solenostoma; Mitt.

Synonyms
- Nardia subgen. Eucalyx Lindb.; Jungermannia sect. Protosolenostoma Amakawa; Eucalyx (Lindb.) Breidl.; Gymnoscyphus Corda; Horikawaella S. Hatt. & Amakawa; Scaphophyllum Inoue; Metasolenostoma Bakalin & Vilnet; Phragmatocolea Grolle; Protosolenostoma (Amakawa) Bakalin & Vilnet

= Solenostoma =

Genus of liverworts

Solenostoma is a genus of liverworts belonging to the family Solenostomataceae.

The species of this genus has a cosmopolitan distribution.

== Species ==
As accepted by GBIF;

- Solenostoma amoenum (Lindenb. & Gottsche) R.M.Schust. ex Váňa, Hentschel & Heinrichs
- Solenostoma amplexifolium (Hampe) Váňa & Schäf.-Verw.
- Solenostoma appalachianum R.M.Schust. ex Bakalin
- Solenostoma appressifolium (Mitt.) Váňa & D.G.Long
- Solenostoma ariadne (Taylor) R.M.Schust. ex Váňa & D.G.Long
- Solenostoma atrobrunneum (Amakawa) Váňa & D.G.Long
- Solenostoma atrorevolutum (Grolle ex Amakawa) Váňa & D.G.Long
- Solenostoma atrovirens Steph.
- Solenostoma balfourii (Váňa) Váňa, Hentschel & Heinrichs
- Solenostoma baueri (Schiffn.) Steph.
- Solenostoma bengalense (Amakawa) Váňa & D.G.Long
- Solenostoma bengalensis (Amak.) Váňa & D.G.Long
- Solenostoma berendtii (Grolle) Váňa, Schäf.-Verw. & Heinrichs
- Solenostoma bilobum (S.Hatt. ex Amakawa) Potemkin & Nyushko
- Solenostoma bolivianum Steph.
- Solenostoma boreale (Damsh. & Váña) N.N.
- Solenostoma borgenii (Gottsche) Stephani
- Solenostoma borneense (Amakawa) Váňa, Hentschel & Heinrichs
- Solenostoma breviflorum Kashyap & R.S.Chopra
- Solenostoma caeleste (Inoue & Váňa) Váňa, Hentschel & Heinrichs
- Solenostoma caespiticium (Lindenb.) Steph.
- Solenostoma callithrix (Lindenb. & Gottsche) Steph.
- Solenostoma caoi (C.Gao & X.L.Bai) Váňa & D.G.Long
- Solenostoma caucasicum (Váňa) Konstant.
- Solenostoma champawatense (S.N.Srivast. & Amakawa) Váňa & D.G.Long
- Solenostoma champawatensis (S.N.S.Srivast. & Amak.) Váňa & D.G.Long
- Solenostoma chenianum (C.Gao, Y.H.Wu & Grolle) Váňa & D.G.Long
- Solenostoma clavellatum Mitt. ex Steph.
- Solenostoma comatum (Nees) C.Gao
- Solenostoma confertissimum (Nees) Schljakov
- Solenostoma coniflorum (Schiffn.) Steph.
- Solenostoma cordifolium (Dumort.) Stephani
- Solenostoma costaricanum Bakalin & Polish Bot.J.
- Solenostoma crassulum (Nees & Mont.) Steph.
- Solenostoma crenuliforme (Austin) Steph.
- Solenostoma cryptogynum R.M.Schust. ex J.J.Engel
- Solenostoma cyclops (S.Hatt.) R.M.Schust.
- Solenostoma cylindricum Stephani
- Solenostoma decolor (Schiffn.) R.M.Schust. ex Váňa, Hentschel & Heinrichs
- Solenostoma decurrens S.Hatt.
- Solenostoma diversiclavellatum (Amakawa & Grolle) R.M.Schust. ex Váňa & D.G.Long
- Solenostoma dulongense Váňa & D.G.Long
- Solenostoma dulongensis Váňa & D.G.Long
- Solenostoma dusenii (Steph.) Váňa, Hentschel & Heinrichs
- Solenostoma duthianum (Stephani) C.Gao
- Solenostoma emarginatum (Amakawa) Váňa, Hentschel & Heinrichs
- Solenostoma erectum (Amakawa) C.Gao
- Solenostoma exsertum (A.Evans) Steph.
- Solenostoma fauriana (Beauverd) Bakalin
- Solenostoma faurieanum (Beauverd) R.M.Schust.
- Solenostoma flagellalioides C.Gao
- Solenostoma flagellare (Amakawa) Váňa & D.G.Long
- Solenostoma flagellaris (Amak.) Váňa & D.G.Long
- Solenostoma flagellatum (S.Hatt.) Váňa & D.G.Long
- Solenostoma flavialbicans (Amakawa & Grolle) Váňa & D.G.Long
- Solenostoma flavorevolutum (Váňa) Váňa & D.G.Long
- Solenostoma fossombronioides (Austin) R.M.Schust.
- Solenostoma fusiforme (Steph.) R.M.Schust.
- Solenostoma glaucum (Amakawa) Váňa & D.G.Long
- Solenostoma gollanii Stephani
- Solenostoma gongshanense (C.Gao & J.Sun) Vána & D.G.Long
- Solenostoma gongshanensis (C.Gao & J.Sun) Váňa & D.G.Long
- Solenostoma gracillimum (Sm.) R.M.Schust.
- Solenostoma grollei (D.G.Long & Váňa) K.Feldberg, Hentschel, Bombosch, D.G.Long, Váňa & Heinrichs
- Solenostoma grosseverrucosum (Amakawa & S.Hatt.) Váňa, Crand.-Stotl. & Stotler
- Solenostoma handelii (Schiffn.) Müll.Frib.
- Solenostoma haskarlianum (Nees) R.M.Schust. ex Váňa & D.G.Long
- Solenostoma hattorianum (Amakawa) Potemkin & Nyushko
- Solenostoma heterolimbatum (Amakawa) Váňa & D.G.Long
- Solenostoma hewsoniae (Amakawa & Grolle) R.M.Schust. ex Váňa, Hentschel & Heinrichs
- Solenostoma hirticalyx (Steph.) R.M.Schust. ex Váňa, Hentschel & Heinrichs
- Solenostoma hiugaense Amakawa
- Solenostoma hodgsoniae (Grolle) J.J.Engel
- Solenostoma hokkaidense (Váňa) Váňa, Hentschel & Heinrichs
- Solenostoma horikawanum (Amakawa) Váňa, Hentschel & Heinrichs
- Solenostoma hyalinum (Lyell) Mitt.
- Solenostoma indrodayanum (Sushil K.Singh & D.K.Singh) Váňa & D.G.Long
- Solenostoma infuscum (Mitt.) Hentschel
- Solenostoma inundatum (Hook.f. & Taylor) Mitt. ex Steph.
- Solenostoma javanicum (Schiffn.) Steph.
- Solenostoma jensenianum (Grolle) Bakalin
- Solenostoma kanaii (Amakawa) Váňa & D.G.Long
- Solenostoma kashyapii (S.C.Srivast., S.Srivast. & D.Sharma) Váňa & D.G.Long
- Solenostoma kurilense (Bakalin) Váňa
- Solenostoma lanigerum (Mitt.) Váňa & D.G.Long
- Solenostoma lignicola (Schiffn.) Váňa, Hentschel & Heinrichs
- Solenostoma lignuifolium (Gottsche) R.M.Schust.
- Solenostoma limbatifolium (Amakawa) Váňa & D.G.Long
- Solenostoma lixingjiangii (C.Gao & X.L.Bai) Váňa & D.G.Long
- Solenostoma louae (C.Gao & X.L.Bai) Váňa & D.G.Long
- Solenostoma macrocarpum (Schiffn. ex Steph.) Váňa & D.G.Long
- Solenostoma mamatkulovii (Váňa & Zerov) Váňa, Hentschel & Heinrichs
- Solenostoma marcescens (Mitt.) Bakalin & Polish Bot.J.
- Solenostoma marginatum (S.Hatt.) R.M.Schust.
- Solenostoma micranthum (Mitt.) Váňa, Hentschel & Heinrichs
- Solenostoma microphyllum C.Gao
- Solenostoma microrevolutum (C.Gao & X.L.Bai) Váňa & D.G.Long
- Solenostoma mildbraedii (Steph.) R.M.Schust.
- Solenostoma montanum (Steph.) Váňa
- Solenostoma multicarpum (C.Gao & J.Sun) Váňa & D.G.Long
- Solenostoma nilgiriense (A.Alam, Ad.Kumar & S.C.Srivast.) Váňa & D.G.Long
- Solenostoma nilgiriensis (A.Alam, Ad.Kumar & S.C.Srivast.) Váňa & D.G.Long
- Solenostoma niveum (Grolle) R.M.Schust. ex Váňa, Hentschel & Heinrichs
- Solenostoma novazelandiae R.M.Schust.
- Solenostoma obliquifolium (Schiffn.) R.M.Schust. ex Váňa, Hentschel & Heinrichs
- Solenostoma oblongifolium (K.Müller) K.Müller
- Solenostoma obovatum (Nees) C.Massal.
- Solenostoma obscurum (A.Evans) R.M.Schust.
- Solenostoma ochotense Bakalin, Vilnet & Bryologist
- Solenostoma ohbae (Amakawa) C.Gao
- Solenostoma onraedtii (Váňa) Váňa, Hentschel & Heinrichs
- Solenostoma orbicularifolium (Piippo ex C.Gao & X.L.Bai) Váňa
- Solenostoma orbiculatum (Colenso) R.M.Schust.
- Solenostoma otianum (S.Hatt.) R.M.Schust.
- Solenostoma ovalifolium (Amakawa) Váňa
- Solenostoma papulosum (Steph.) Bakalin
- Solenostoma paroicum (Schiffn.) R.M.Schust.
- Solenostoma parviperianthum (C.Gao & X.L.Bai) Váňa, Hentschel & J.Heinrichs
- Solenostoma parvitextum (Amakawa) Váňa & D.G.Long
- Solenostoma patoniae (Grolle, D.B.Schill & D.G.Long) K.Feldberg, Hentschel, Bombosch, D.G.Long, Váňa & Heinrichs
- Solenostoma philippinense Váňa
- Solenostoma plagiochilaceum (Grolle) Váňa & D.G.Long
- Solenostoma pocsii (Váňa) Bakalin
- Solenostoma poeltii (Amakawa) Váňa & D.G.Long
- Solenostoma polare (Lindb.) R.M.Schust.
- Solenostoma polyrhizoides (Grolle ex Amakawa) Váňa & D.G.Long
- Solenostoma pseudocyclops (Inoue) Váňa & D.G.Long
- Solenostoma pseudopyriflorum Bakalin & Vilnet
- Solenostoma pumilum (With.) Müll.Frib.
- Solenostoma purpuratum (Mitt.) Steph.
- Solenostoma pyriflorum Steph.
- Solenostoma radicellosum Mitt.
- Solenostoma raujeanum (Grolle ex Amakawa) Váňa & D.G.Long
- Solenostoma renauldii (Steph.) Váňa, Hentschel & Heinrichs
- Solenostoma riclefii Váňa & D.G.Long
- Solenostoma rigidulum (S.Hatt.) R.M.Schust.
- Solenostoma rossicum Bakalin, Vilnet & Bryologist
- Solenostoma rosulans (Steph.) Váňa & D.G.Long
- Solenostoma rotundatum Amakawa
- Solenostoma rubripunctatum (S.Hatt.) R.M.Schust.
- Solenostoma rubrum (Gottsche ex Underw.) R.M.Schust.
- Solenostoma rufiflorum (Colenso) J.J.Engel
- Solenostoma rupicola (Amakawa) Váňa & D.G.Long
- Solenostoma sanguinolentum (Griff.) Steph.
- Solenostoma schaulianum (Steph.) Váňa & D.G.Long
- Solenostoma schusteranum (J.D.Godfrey & G.Godfrey) Váňa, Hentschel & Heinrichs
- Solenostoma schusterianum (J.D.Godfrey & G.Godfrey) Váňa, Hentschel & J.Heinrichs
- Solenostoma shimizuanum (S.Hatt. ex Váňa) Váňa, Hentschel & Heinrichs
- Solenostoma sichuanicum Bakalin & W.Li
- Solenostoma sikkimense (Schiffn. ex Steph.) Váňa & D.G.Long
- Solenostoma sikkimensis (Stephani) Váňa & D.G.Long
- Solenostoma speciosum (Horik.) Hentschel, K.Feldberg, Bombosch, D.G.Long, Váňa & Heinrichs
- Solenostoma sphaerocarpum (Hook.) Steph.
- Solenostoma stephanii (Schiffn.) Steph.
- Solenostoma stoloniferum (Steph.) S.W.Arnell
- Solenostoma strictum (Schiffn.) Váňa, Hentschel & Heinrichs
- Solenostoma subacutum (Herzog) Váňa, Crand.-Stotl. & Stotler
- Solenostoma subellipticum (Lindb. ex Heeg) R.M.Schust.
- Solenostoma suborbiculatum (Amakawa) Váňa & D.G.Long
- Solenostoma subrubrum (Schiffn. ex Steph.) Váňa & D.G.Long
- Solenostoma subtilissimum (Schiffn.) R.M.Schust.
- Solenostoma sunii Bakalin & Vilnet
- Solenostoma tetragonum (Lindenb.) R.M.Schust. ex Váňa & D.G.Long
- Solenostoma torticalyx (Steph.) C.Gao
- Solenostoma totopapillosum (E.A.Hodgs.) R.M.Schust.
- Solenostoma truncatum (Nees) R.M.Schust. ex Váňa & D.G.Long
- Solenostoma tuberculiferum (Herzog) Váňa, Hentschel & Heinrichs
- Solenostoma udarii (S.C.Srivast. & P.Singh) Váňa & D.G.Long
- Solenostoma unispire (Amakawa) Váňa, Hentschel & Heinrichs
- Solenostoma ventroversum (Grolle) Váňa & D.G.Long
- Solenostoma virgatum (Mitt.) Váňa & D.G.Long
- Solenostoma vulcanicola (Schiffn.) Nyushko ex Potemkin & Sofronova
- Solenostoma wattsianum (Steph.) R.M.Schust. ex Váňa Hentschel & J.Heinrichs
- Solenostoma zangmuii (C.Gao & X.L.Bai) Váňa & D.G.Long
- Solenostoma zantenii (Amakawa) R.M.Schust. ex Váňa & D.G.Long
- Solenostoma zengii (C.Gao & X.L.Bai) Váňa & D.G.Long
