= Non-vascular plant =

Plant without a vascular system

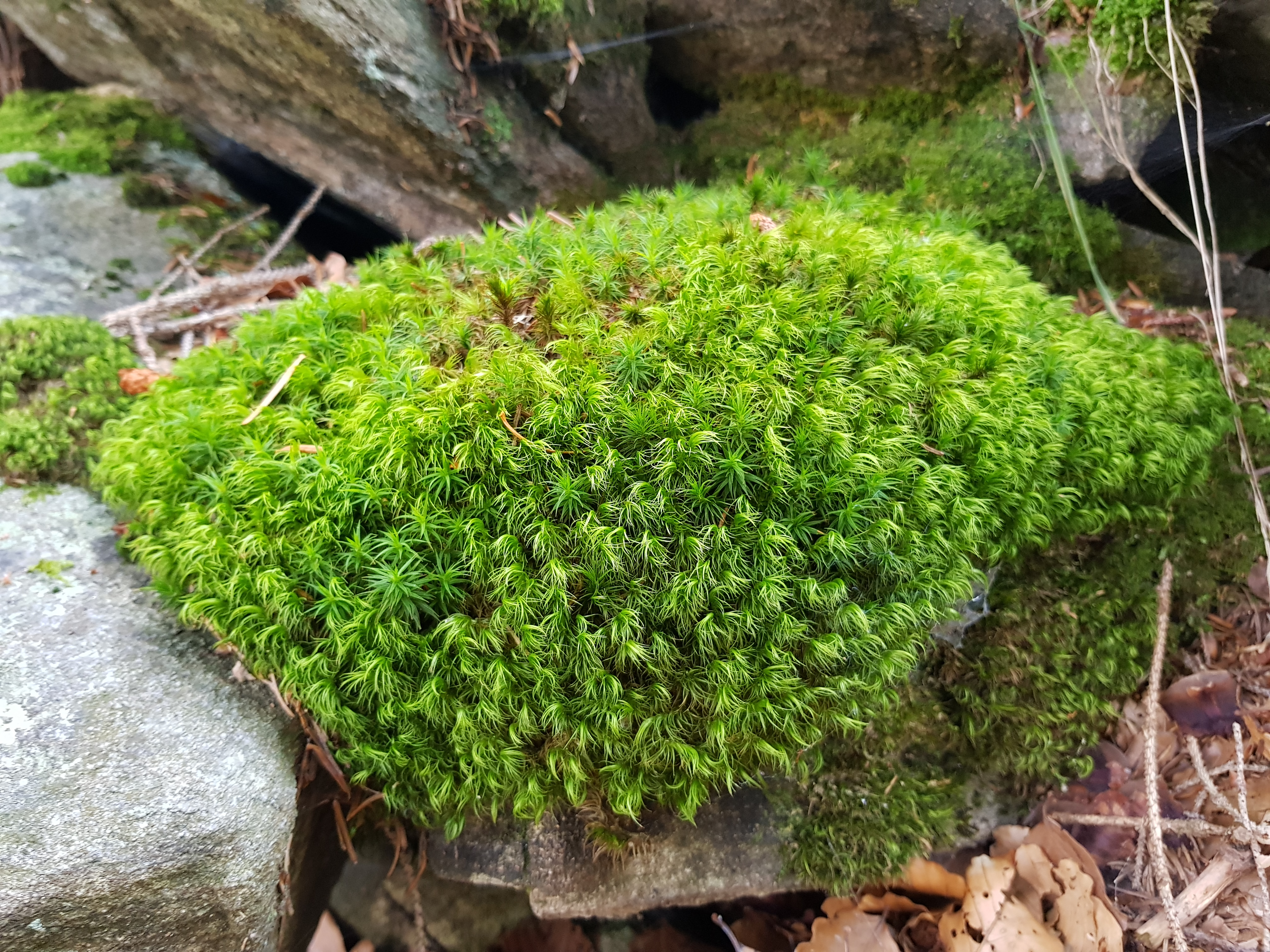
Mosses are non-vascular plants.

Non-vascular plants are embryophytic plants that lack the vascular tissues xylem and phloem that are responsible for transporting water and sugar in vascular plants.

== Groups ==
Non-vascular plants are also known as Bryophytes, an informal group that taxonomists now treat as three separate land-plant divisions, namely: Bryophyta (mosses), Marchantiophyta (liverworts), and Anthocerotophyta (hornworts). In all bryophytes, the primary plants are the haploid gametophytes, with the only diploid portion being the attached sporophyte, consisting of a stalk and sporangium. Because these plants lack lignified water-conducting tissues, they cannot become as tall as most vascular plants. In many ways, non-vascular plants resemble the first land plants that evolved from multicellular green algae. Although some earlier sources considered multicellular forms of green algae to be non-vascular plants, modern sources emphasize that all land plants (and no other members of Viridiplantae, the clade that includes both land plants and green algae) are united by the trait of embryo protection. Hence the term embryophyte is a synonym for land plants, including non-vascular plants.

== Terminology and characteristics ==
These groups are only sometimes called "lower plants", referring to their status as the earliest plant groups to evolve, but the usage is imprecise since bryophytes are a polyphyletic group. Non-vascular plants are often among the first species to move into new and inhospitable territories, along with prokaryotes and protists, and thus function as pioneer species.

Mosses and leafy liverworts have structures called phyllids that resemble leaves, but only consist of single sheets of cells with no internal air spaces, no cuticle or stomata, and no xylem or phloem. Consequently, phyllids are unable to control the rate of water loss from their tissues and are said to be poikilohydric. Some liverworts, such as Marchantia, have a cuticle, and the sporophytes of mosses have both cuticles and stomata.

All land plants have a life cycle with an alternation of generations between a diploid sporophyte and a haploid gametophyte, but in all non-vascular land plants, the gametophyte generation is dominant. In these plants, the sporophytes grow from and are dependent on gametophytes for supply of water and mineral nutrients and photosynthate, the products of photosynthesis.

== Environmental role ==
Non-vascular plants play crucial roles in their environments. They often dominate certain biomes such as mires, bogs and lichen tundra where these plants perform primary ecosystem functions. Additionally, in bogs mosses host microbial communities which help support the functioning of peatlands. This provides essential goods and services to humans such as global carbon sinks, water purification systems, fresh water reserves as well as biodiversity and peat resources. This is achieved through nutrient acquisition from dominant plants under nutrient-stressed conditions.

Non-vascular plants can also play important roles in other biomes such as deserts, tundra and alpine regions. They have been shown to contribute to soil stabilization, nitrogen fixation, carbon assimilation etc. These are all crucial components in an ecosystem in which non-vascular plants play a pivotal role.
