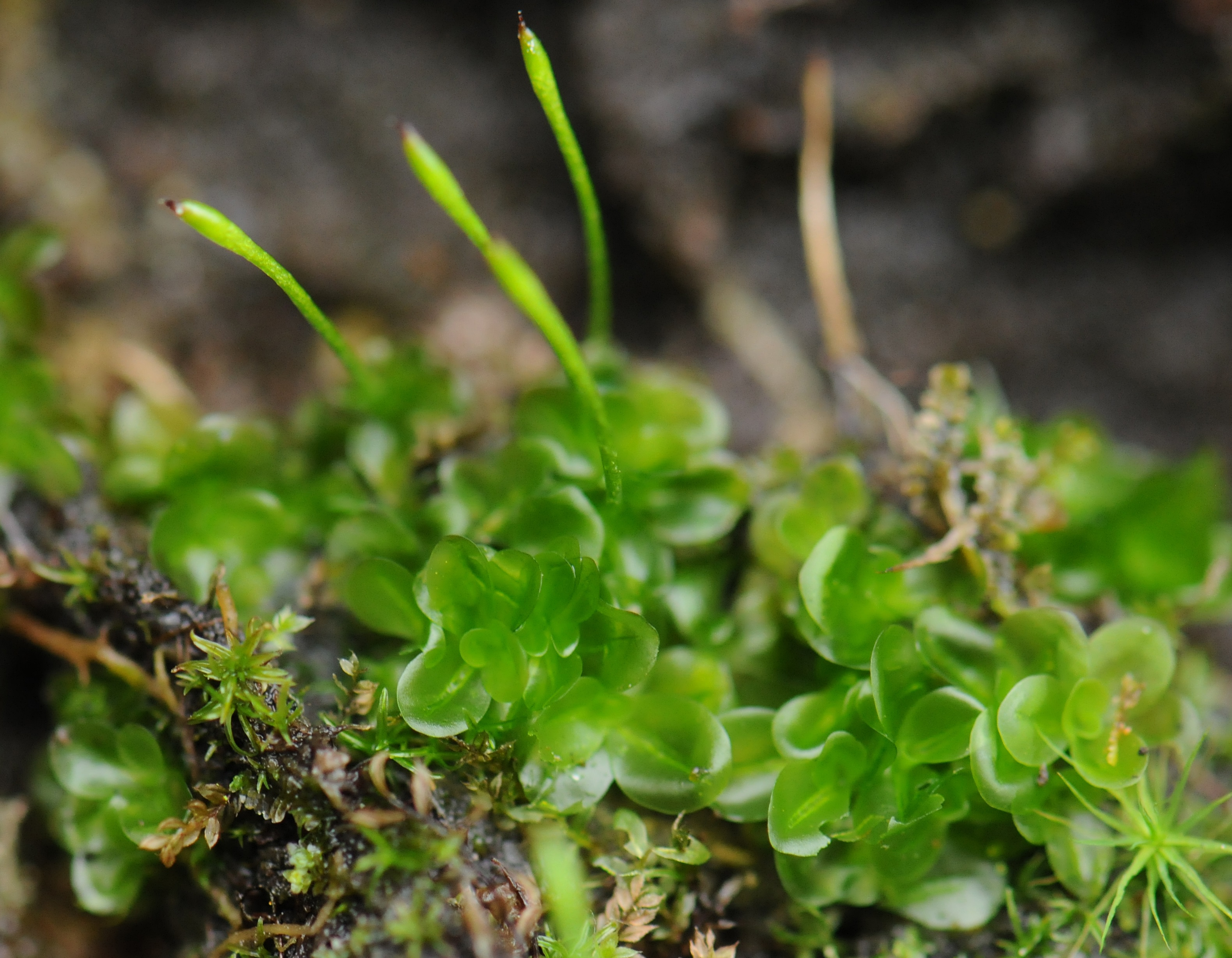
- Oedipodium griffithianum

Scientific classification
- Kingdom: Plantae
- Division: Bryophyta
- Class: Polytrichopsida; Goffinet & W.R.Buck
- Order: Oedipodiales; Goffinet & W.R.Buck
- Family: Oedipodiaceae; Schimp.
- Genus: Oedipodium; Schwägr.
- Species: O. griffithianum

Binomial name
- Oedipodium griffithianum (Dickson) Schwägr.

Synonyms
- Bryum griffithianum Dickson; Gymnostomum griffithianum (Dickson) Smith; Hymenostomum griffithianum (Dicks.) Spreng.; Bryum bulbiforme Broth.; Gymnomitriella laevifoliaSakurai; Splachnum froehlichianum With.; Splachnum succulentum Brid.

= Oedipodium =

Genus of mosses

Oedipodium is the only genus of moss in the family Oedipodiaceae. It contains the single species Oedipodium griffithianum, the gouty-moss or Griffith's oedipodium moss. This species is distributed in cooler climates of Eurasia, as well as from Alaska, Washington state, British Columbia, Yukon, Greenland, Newfoundland, Tierra del Fuego and the Falkland Islands.

The relationship of Oedipodium to other mosses has been much debated. Previously, the taxon has been included with the Funariales or the Splachnales. However, characteristics of the protonemata and asexual propagation, along with molecular evidence, point to a closer relationship with the Tetraphidaceae.

order Oedipodiales

familyOedipodiaceae

Oedipodium

- - Takakiopsida
  - Sphagnopsida
  - - - Andreaeopsida
      - Andreaeobryopsida
      - - Oedipodium
        - - Tetraphidopsida
          - Polytrichopsida
          - Bryopsida

The phylogenetic position of Oedipodium among the eight classes of mosses, based on inferences from DNA sequence data.
