= Hiroshi Inoue (bryologist) =

Japanese botanist (1932–1989)

- 井上 浩
- Died: 29 December 1989 (aged 57)
- Scientific career
- Fields: Bryology

Hiroshi Inoue (井上 浩, Inoue Hiroshi; March 30, 1932 – December 29, 1989) was a Japanese botanist specializing in bryology.

Inoue's botanical publications are from Japan. He described or recognized many species of liverworts and edited the exsiccata Bryophyta selecta exsiccata.

== Selected publications ==
- Hattori, S. & H. Inoue. (1958). "Preliminary report on Takakia lepidozioides." Journal of the Hattori Botanical Laboratory 18: 133–137.
- Inoue, H. (1966). "Monosoleniaceae, a new family segregated from the Marchantiaceae." Bulletin of the National Science Museum (Tokyo) 9(2): 115–118, +2 pl.
- Inoue, H. (1976). "The concept of genus in the Plagiochilaceae." Journal of the Hattori Botanical Laboratory 41: 13–17.
- Inoue, H. (1984). The genus Plagiochila (Dum.) Dum. in southeast Asia. Tokyo: Academic Scientific Book, Inc., 142 pages.
