= Mosses of Western Australia =

Western Australia has relatively few species of moss; the most recent census found just 192 taxa. This represents just 10% of Australia's total moss flora, even though Western Australia accounts for about one third of the Australia by area. This relatively low diversity has been attributed to the lack of rainforest in the state.

By far the majority of the state's moss species occur in the Southwest Botanical Province, with over 80% of all species, genera and families occurring there. This includes four species that are apparently endemic to the province.

About 70% of Western Australia's moss taxa occur also in South Australia, and a similar proportion occur also in New South Wales. Only about 50% occur also in Queensland. About half are restricted to Australia, New Zealand and South Africa, and a further 10% occur also only in South America.

== List of mosses of Western Australia ==
This is a list of mosses of Western Australia, with classification updated.

=== Subclass Sphagnidae ===
==== Sphagnaceae ====
- Sphagnum molliculum

=== Subclass Funariidae ===
==== Encalyptaceae ====
- Bryobartramia novae-valesiae

==== Funariaceae ====
- Funaria apophysata
- F. cuspidata
- F. gracilis
- F. helmsii
- F. hygrometrica
- F. muhlenbergii
- F. phymatodea
- F. producta
- F. radians
- F. salsicola
- F. subnuda
- Goniomitrium acuminatum
- G. enerve

==== Gigaspermaceae ====
- Gigaspermum repens

=== Subclass Dicranidae ===
==== Grimmiaceae ====
- Grimmia apocarpa
- G. laevigata
- G. pulvinata
- G. trichophylla
- Racomitrium crispulum

==== Ptychomitriaceae ====
- Ptychomitrium australe

==== Archidiaceae ====
- Archidium indicum
- A. rehmanii
- A. rothii

==== Fissidentaceae ====
- Fissidens asplenioides
- F. bifrons
- F. ceylonensis
- F. gillianus
- F. gymnocarpus
- F. hebetatus
- F. leptocladus
- F. maceratus
- F. megalotis
- F. microcladus
- F. perobtusus
- F. pungens
- F. taylorii
- F. tenellus
- F. victorialis

==== Ditrichaceae ====
- Ceratodon purpureus
- Ditrichum difficile
- Eccremidium arcuatum
- E. exiguum
- E. minutum
- E. pulchellum
- E. whiteleggei
- Pleuridium acuminatum
- P. ecklonii
- P. nervosum

==== Bruchiaceae ====
- Bruchia brevipes
- Tremadoton acutus

==== Dicranaceae ====
- Campylopus acuminatus
- C. australis
- C. bicolor
- C. flindersii
- C. incrassatus
- C. introflexus
- C. pyriformis
- Dicranoloma billardieri
- D. diaphanoneurum

==== Leucobryaceae ====
- Leucobryum subchlorophyllosum

==== Erpodiaceae ====
- Erpodium australiense

==== Calymperaceae ====
- Calymperes erosum
- Calymperes tenerum
- Octoblepharum albidum

==== Pottiaceae ====
Note: The genera Desmatodon, Phascum, Pottia, and Tortula were heavily revised by Zander, and a number of names in the list below are no longer correct.

- Acaulon eremicola
- A. granulosum
- A. integrifolium
- A. leucochaete
- A. mediterraneum
- A. triquetrum
- Aloina sullivaniana
- Barbula calycina
- B. crinita
- B. ehrenbergii
- B. hornschuchiana
- B. indica
- B. luteola
- B. subcalycina
- Bryoerythrophyllum binnsii
- Calymperastrum latifolium
- Crossidium davidai
- C. geheebii
- D. recurvatus
- Didymodon luehmannii
- D. subtorquatus
- D. torquatus
- Gymnostomiella vernicosa
- Gymnostomum calcareum
- Hyophila involuta
- H. rosea
- Leptodontium paradoxum
- Phasconica balansae
- Phascopsis rubicunda
- Phascum laticostum
- P. longipilum
- P. robustum var. crassinervium
- Pottia brevicaulis
- P. davalliana
- P. drummondii
- P. scabrifolia
- P. starckeana
- Pterygoneurum kemsleyi
- P. ovatum
- Splachnobryum wiemansii
- Stonea oleaginosa
- Tetrapterum cylindricum
- Tortella cirrhata
- T. flavovirens
- Tortula antarctica
- T. atrovirens (=Desmatodon convolutus)
- T. muralis
- T. pagorum
- T. papillosa
- T. rubella
- Trichostomopsis australasiae
- Trichostomum brachydontium
- Triquetrella papillata
- Uleobryum peruvianum
- Weissia brachycarpa
- W. controversa
- W. rutilans

==== Rhabdoweisiaceae ====
- Amphidium cyathicarpum

==== Ephemeraceae ====
- Ephemerum cristatum
- E. rehmannii

=== Subclass Bryidae ===
==== Splachnaceae ====
- Tayloria octoblepharum

==== Orthotrichaceae ====
- Macromitrium archeri
- Zygodon intermedius
- Z. menziesii
- Z. minutus

==== Hedwigiaceae ====
- Hedwigia ciliata
- H. integrifolia

==== Rhacocarpaceae ====
- Rhacocarpus purpurascens
- R. webbianus

==== Bryaceae ====
- Brachymenium coarctatum
- B. exile
- B. indicum
- B. preissianum
- Bryum albo-limbatum
- B. apiculatum
- B. argenteum
- B. australe
- B. billardieri var. billardieri
- B. billardieri var. platyloma
- B. caespiticium
- B. campylothecium
- B. capillare
- B. cellulare
- B. cheelii
- B. chrysoneuron
- B. creberrimum
- B. dichotomum
- B. inaequale
- B. lanatum
- B. pachytheca
- B. torquescens
- Pleurophascum occidentale

==== Orthodontiaceae ====
- Orthodontium inflatum
- O. lineare
- O. pallens

==== Mniaceae ====
- Pohlia wahlenbergii
- Schizymenium bryoides

==== Bartramiaceae ====
- Bartramia afro-stricta
- B. compacta
- B. hampei
- B. papillata
- B. pseudostricta
- B. strictifolia
- Breutelia affinis
- Philonotis australiensis (= Bartramidula pusilla; The genus Bartramidula has been synonymized with Philonotis.)
- P. mollis
- P. tenuis

==== Racopilaceae ====
- Racopilum convolutaceum

==== Mitteniaceae ====
- Mittenia plumula

==== Pilotrichaceae ====
- Sauloma tenella

==== Pterigynandraceae ====
- Trachyphyllum inflexus

==== Thuidiaceae ====
- Thuidium sparsum var. hastatum

==== Campyliaceae ====
- Drepanocladus aduncus
- D. sendtneri

==== Fabroniaceae ====
- Fabronia australis
- F. hampeana
- Ischyrodon lepturus

==== Hypnaceae ====
- Hypnum cupressiforme var. mossmanianum
- Taxiphyllum minutirameum
- Vesicularia montagnei
- V. rivalis

==== Sematophyllaceae ====
- Sematophyllum amoenum
- S. caespitosum
- S. contiguum
- S. homomallum
