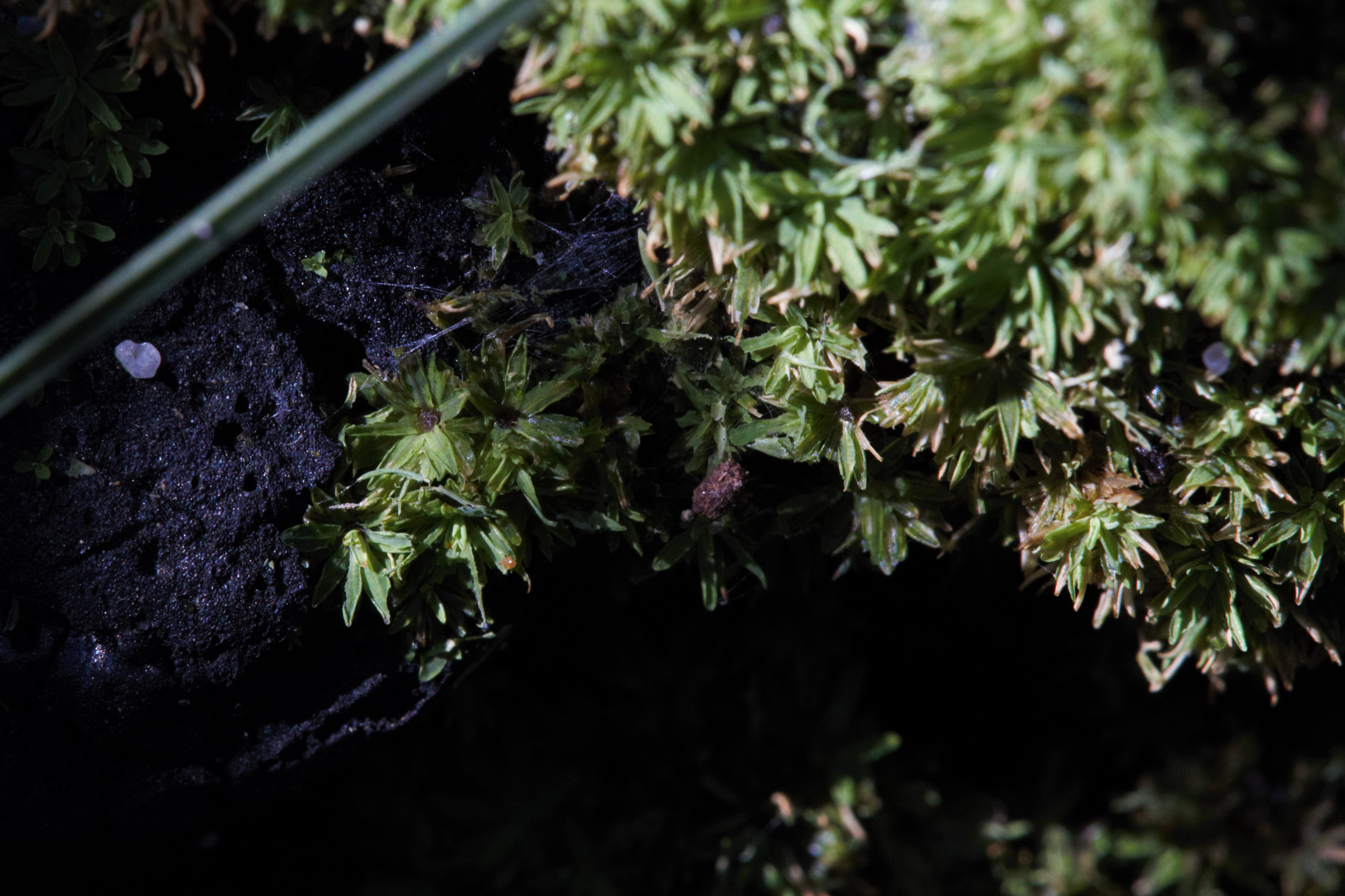
- Calymperastrum latifolium growing on Macrozamia, observed near Perth

Conservation status
- Priority Two — Poorly Known Taxa (DEC)

Scientific classification
- Kingdom: Plantae
- Division: Bryophyta
- Class: Bryopsida
- Subclass: Dicranidae
- Order: Pottiales
- Family: Pottiaceae
- Genus: Calymperastrum; I.G.Stone
- Species: C. latifolium

Binomial name
- Calymperastrum latifolium (Hampe) I.G.Stone

= Calymperastrum =

Genus of mosses

Calymperastrum latifolium is the sole species in the monotypic moss genus Calymperastrum. It is a poorly known moss, having been collected only three times. All three collections were from the trunks of Macrozamia, in the Southwest Botanic Province of Western Australia. It is presumed endemic to the region, making it the only moss genus known endemic to that state.

== Description ==
This moss grows in a low turf, yellowish green from above but yellowish brown below. It has unbranching stems about six millimetres in length, with a reddish-brown mat of hairs on their lower half. These support numerous narrow spathulate leaves from 2.0 to 3.1 millimetres long. Nothing is known of its sexual structures and sporophytes.

== Taxonomy ==
This taxon was first collected from near Perth in the 1840s, and published as Calymperes latifolium in 1846 by Georg Ernst Ludwig Hampe, in Volume II of Johann Georg Christian Lehmann's Plantae Preissianae. In the 1980s, a careful examination showed it to be only superficially similar to Calymperes (Calymperaceae). It was held to belong to a different family, the Pottiaceae, but did not fit into any of that family's published genera. In 1985, therefore, Ilma Grace Stone published Calymperastrum and transferred C. latifolium into it.

Since publication the genus has been treated only once, in R. H. Zander's 1993 Genera of the Pottiaceae: Mosses of Harsh Environments. Zander found its morphology to be transitional between the Pottiaceae and the Calymperaceae, having many properties characteristic of the latter, and many properties characteristic of both. The only character of Calymperastrum that does not occur in the Calastraceae is the presence of a leaf hydroid strand.

In 1999 the genus was accepted as valid in Crosby's A Checklist of Mosses.

== Distribution and habitat ==
This moss has only been collected three times, once from near Perth, and twice from the vicinity of Windy Harbour. It is therefore presumed endemic to the Southwest Botanic Province of Western Australia. This would make it the only endemic moss genus in Western Australia, although the region is thought to contain a further three endemic species of non-endemic genera.

== Ecology ==
All three collections of this moss were found growing as an epiphyte on the trunk of a Macrozamia. It is therefore postulated, but by no means certain, that the species has a preference for this genus.

Because there are so few known populations of this moss, the Department of Environment and Conservation has rated it "Priority Two - Poorly Known Taxa" on the Declared Rare and Priority Flora List.

== See also ==
- Mosses of Western Australia
