= Austrothamnium pandum =

Scientific classification
- Kingdom: Plantae
- Clade: Embryophytes
- Division: Bryophyta
- Class: Bryopsida
- Subclass: Bryidae
- Order: Hypnales
- Family: Neckeraceae
- Genus: Austrothamnium
- Species: A. pandum

Binomial name
- Austrothamnium pandum (Hook.f. & Wilson) Enroth

Synonyms
- Basionym: Isothecium pandum Hook.f. & Wilson; List: Hypnodendron eflagellare (Ångstr.) F.M.Bailey; Hypnodendron flagellare (Ångstr.) F.M.Bailey; Porotrichum latifolium Bosch & Sande Lac.; Thamnium eflagellare Ångstr.; Thamnium flagellare Ångstr.; Thamnium latifolium (Bosch & Sande Lac.) A.Jaeger; Thamnium latifolium var. elongatum Dixon; Thamnium pandum (Hook.f. & Wilson) A.Jaeger; Thamnobryum latifolium (Bosch & Sande Lac.) Nieuwl.; Thamnobryum pandum (Hook.f. & Wilson) I.G.Stone & G.A.M.Scott

Species of moss

Austrothamnium pandum is a species of moss from Australia and New Zealand.

== Description ==
Austrothamnium pandum is a small, gregarious dark green moss.

== Taxonomy ==
The species was first scientifically described by Joseph Dalton Hooker and William M. Wilson in 1854 as Isothecium pandum. Johannes Enroth reclassified the species with the name Austrothamnium pandum in 2019.

=== Etymology ===
The generic name is from the Latin australis for 'southern' combined with the genus name for Thamnobryum. The species name is the Latin for 'bent, curved.'

== Range ==
North and South Island of New Zealand, Queensland and New South Wales Australia, and Norfolk Island.

== Habitat ==
Grows in wet areas, particularly along streams.
