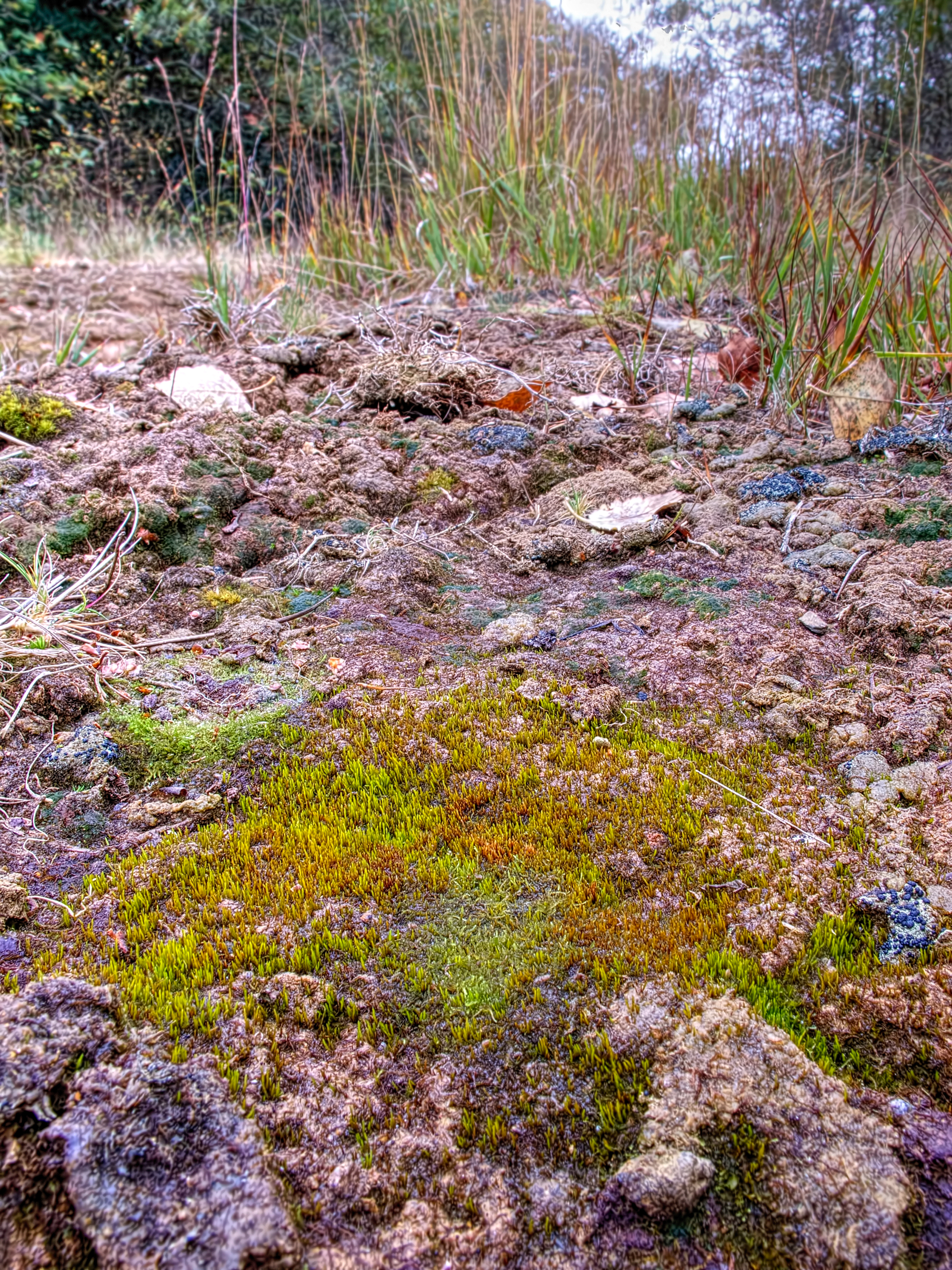

Conservation status
- Endangered (IUCN 3.1)

Scientific classification
- Kingdom: Plantae
- Clade: Embryophytes
- Division: Bryophyta
- Class: Bryopsida
- Subclass: Dicranidae
- Order: Ditrichales
- Family: Ditrichaceae
- Genus: Ditrichum
- Species: D. plumbicola

Binomial name
- Ditrichum plumbicola Crundw., 1976

= Ditrichum plumbicola =

Species of moss

Ditrichum plumbicola, also known as lead moss, is a moss species known for growing in lead rich soils. It was formally described by Alan Crundwell in 1976.

== Description ==
Ditrichum plumbicola will form dense narrow dense tufts or short turfs. The moss is dark green or yellowish green in colour. The shoots are 3–8 mm tall and possess short triangular leaves, which are less than 1 mm in length and are pressed closely to the stem. The species is sterile and spreads via vegetative propagation and stem fragmentation.

== Distribution and habitat ==
Ditrichum plumbicola is endemic to Europe where it can be found growing in Belgium, France, Germany, Ireland, Isle of Man, and the United Kingdom. It has been recorded growing at elevations up to 460 metres above sea level.

Ditrichum plumbicola can only be found in close proximity to lead mines where human activity has caused the surrounding soil to become contaminated with high levels of lead. Sites of lead contamination are largely devoid of vascular plants, which allows D. plumbicola to grow without competition due to many plants not being able to tolerate such conditions. The species grows in damp acidic lead rich soils, it can grow in exposed areas however is vulnerable to drying out during drought. The species cannot colonize highly calcareous lead rich soils.

== Threats ==
Ditrichum plumbicola relies on lead contamination for suitable habitat to be created. Due to the closure of many lead mining sites new lead rich substrates are no longer being created for the species to colonize. Locations of older habitat naturally leach lead into the surrounding area causing the concentration of lead to decrease. As sites become less toxic the habitat can then be colonized by a broader range of plant species, which shade out the moss.

D. plumbicola is also threatened by human activity. The sites where the species grows are often regarded as wasteland, which are only suitable for redevelopment. Sites where the moss grows are also used for the illegal dumping of waste and for recreational off-road motorcycling, which has a negative impact on the species.
