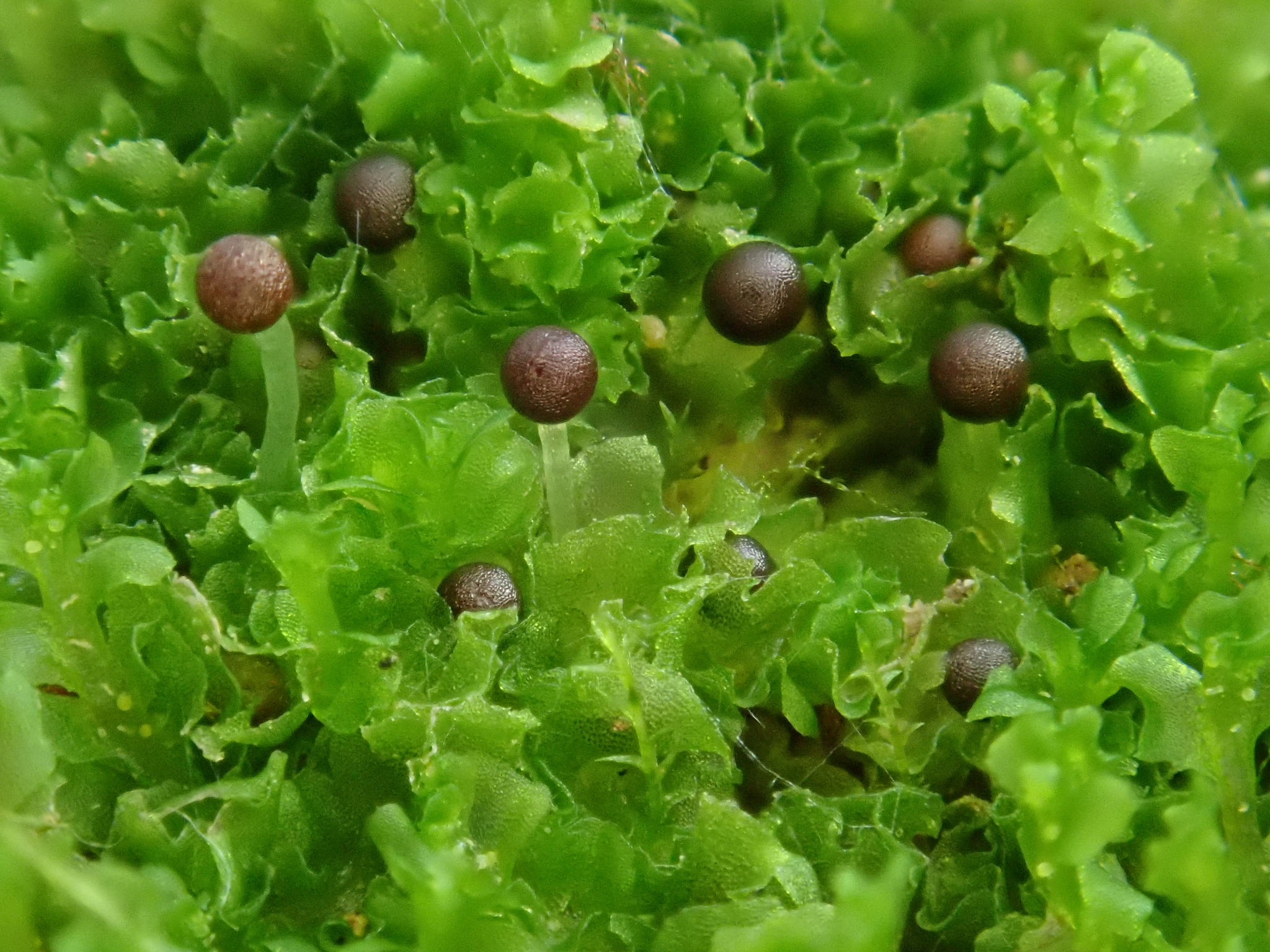

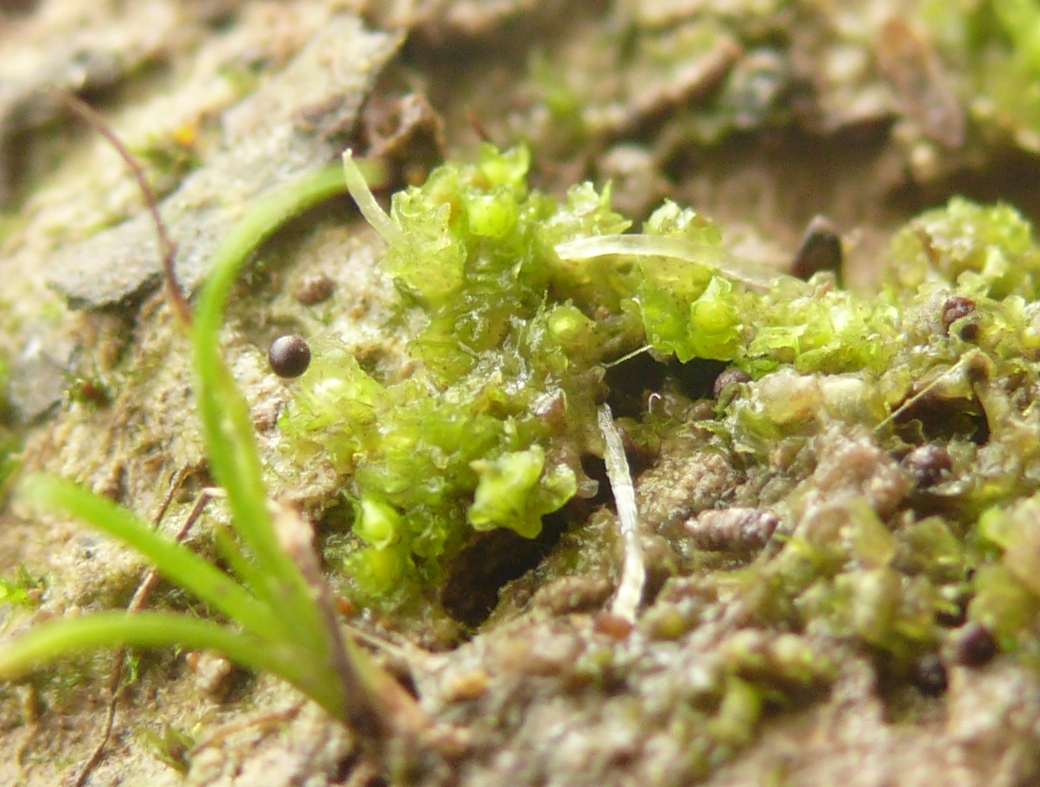

Scientific classification
- Kingdom: Plantae
- Division: Marchantiophyta
- Class: Jungermanniopsida
- Order: Fossombroniales
- Family: Fossombroniaceae
- Genus: Fossombronia
- Species: F. wondraczekii

Binomial name
- Fossombronia wondraczekii (Corda) Dumort. ex Lindb.

= Fossombronia wondraczekii =

Species of liverwort

Fossombronia wondraczekii is a species of liverwort belonging to the family Fossombroniaceae.

It has cosmopolitan distribution.
