= Phoenix United Mine =

Disused copper and tin mine in Cornwall, England

- Site of Special Scientific Interest
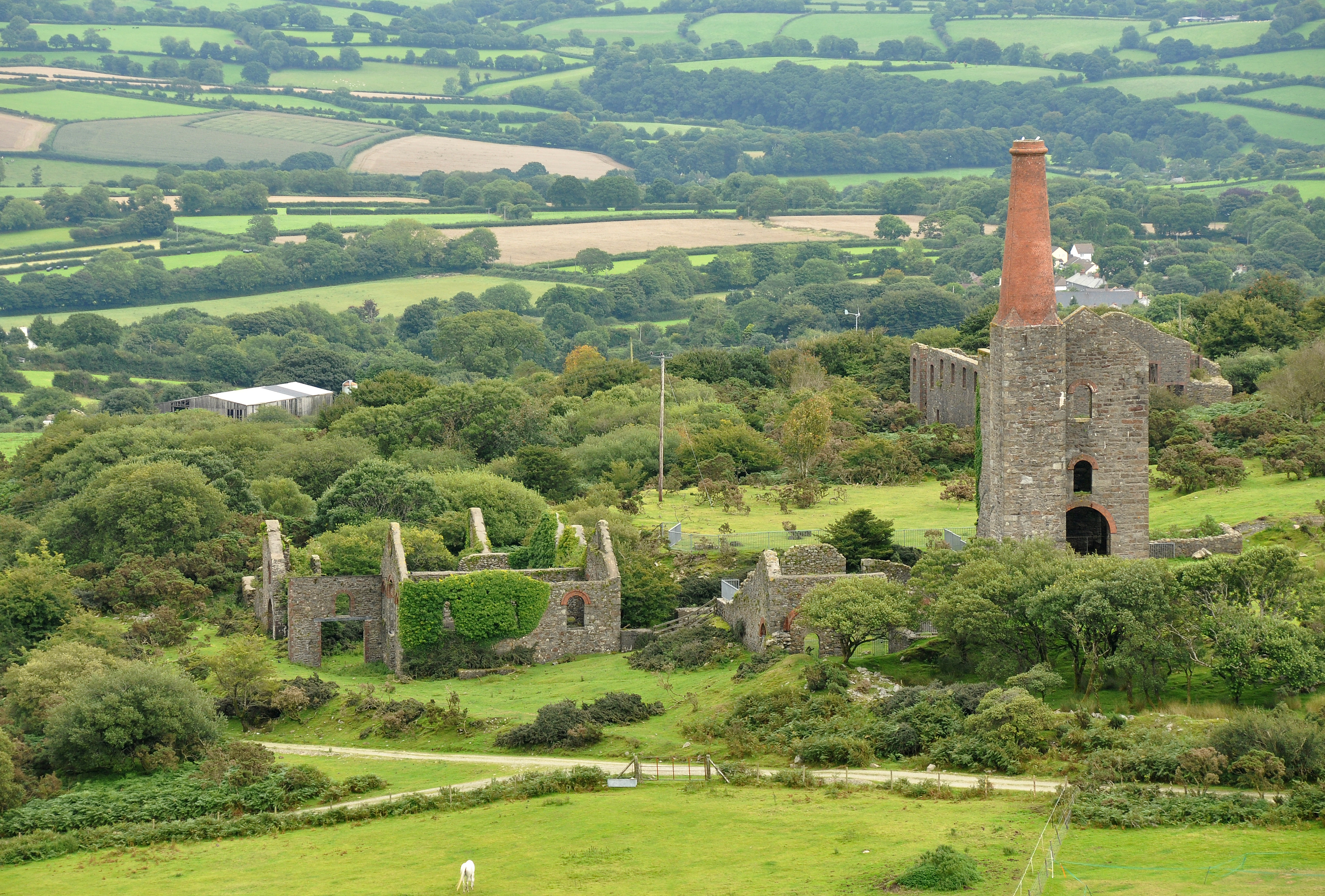
- Disused buildings of Phoenix United Mine

- Location within Cornwall Location within England
- Location of Phoenix United Mine.
- Area of search: Cornwall
- Grid reference: SX266724
- Coordinates: 50.5261°N 4.4471°W
- Interest: Biological
- Area: 29.79 hectares (0.298 km^{2}; 0.115 sq mi)
- Notification date: 1996

Phoenix United Mine is a disused 19th century copper and tin mine in Cornwall, England, UK. Heavy metals left over in the soil from the mining operations have allowed mosses and lichens to flourish, and today the site is a Site of Special Scientific Interest (SSSI), noted for its biological characteristics.

All of the land designated as Phoenix United Mine SSSI is owned by the Duchy of Cornwall.

== History ==
The mine was first worked in 1836 as Cornwall Great United Mines, having previously been mined separately as Clanacombe, Stowes and Wheal Prosper mines. The mine was subsequently bought by James Seccombe in 1842 who renamed it Phoenix Mine/Wheal Phoenix in 1844, finally being called Phoenix United Mine when West Phoenix Mine was incorporated.

The mine originally extracted copper, the 1850s being the mine's peak production of the metal, with a work force of 130. By the 1860s the copper reserves were diminishing but consultant mining engineer, William West, bought a controlling share in the company and equipped the mine to extract tin in 1864 after samples showed evidence of tin deposits. By 1865 the work force had expanded to 460, continuing to 600 by the 1870s. It used the Liskeard and Caradon Railway to transport the ore away and supply the mine with coal. With the price of tin and copper slumping, the West Phoenix Mine ceased operation in 1898. The final shaft, the Prince of Wales Shaft, was closed in 1914.

== Geography ==
The 29.8-hectare (74-acre) SSSI, notified in 1996, is located within the civil parish of Linkinhorne, on the south-eastern edge of Bodmin Moor, 5 miles (8.0 km) north of the town of Liskeard.

The SSSI also forms part of Phoenix United Mine and Crow's Nest Special Area of Conservation.

== Wildlife and ecology ==
The habitat of the site is dominated by presence of heavy metals from the mining operations within the soil. This has restricted the growth of vascular plants and has allowed bryophytes (mosses and liverworts) and lichens to flourish. Phoenix United Mine is important for its rare bryophytes.

On the site, on the banks of a metal-rich stream, can be found three nationally rare liverwort species that are listed in the Red Data Book of rare and endangered plant species; these being Cephaloziella integerrima, Cephaloziella massalongi and Cephaloziella nicholsonii. The nationally scarce liverwort, Cephaloziella stellulifera is also present within the mine.

Two nationally scarce species of moss, Gymnostomum viridulum and Gymnostomum calcareum, are supported on the site. The mine is one of only two sites in the world where Cornish path moss (Ditrichum cornubicum) grows, the other being Crow's Nest. This moss is a pioneer species of bare or sparsely vegetated, mine-waste laden soils.

Greater horseshoe bats (Rhinolophus ferrumequinum) use disused mine adits as a winter roosting site, and other bat species feed on the site.
