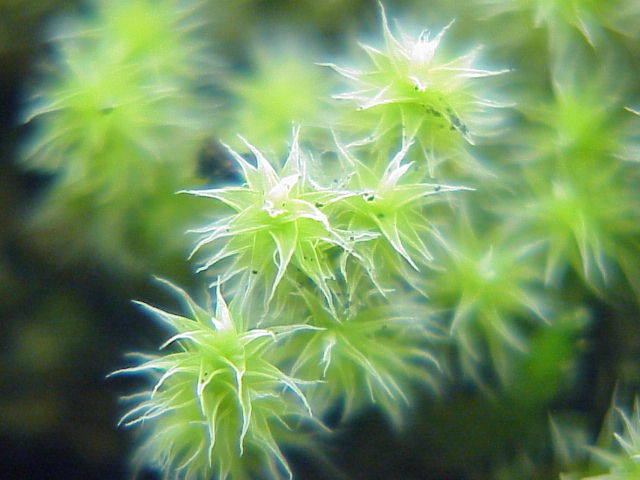
- Hedwigia ciliata

Scientific classification
- Kingdom: Plantae
- Division: Bryophyta
- Class: Bryopsida
- Subclass: Bryidae
- Order: Hedwigiales
- Family: Hedwigiaceae
- Genus: Hedwigia; P.Beauv.

= Hedwigia =

Genus of mosses

Hedwigia is a genus of mosses belonging to the family Hedwigiaceae.

The genus was first described by Palisot de Beauvois in 1804.

The genus has cosmopolitan distribution. There are twelve accepted species, including:

- Hedwigia ciliata
- Hedwigia stellata
