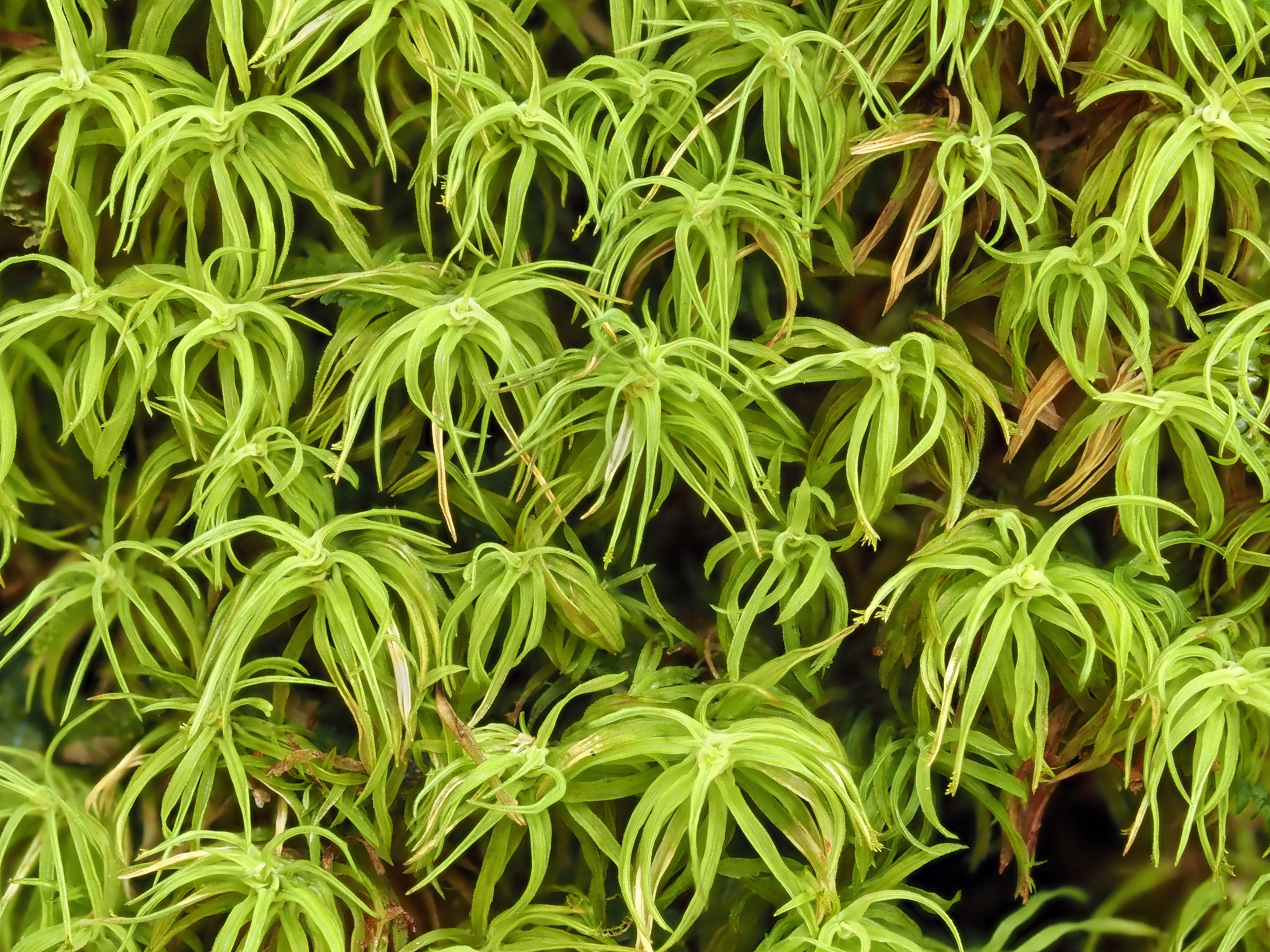
- Syrrhopodon mahensis

Scientific classification
- Kingdom: Plantae
- Clade: Embryophytes
- Division: Bryophyta
- Class: Bryopsida
- Subclass: Dicranidae
- Order: Dicranales
- Family: Calymperaceae
- Genus: Syrrhopodon; Schwägr.

Type species
- Syrrhopodon gardneri (Hook.) Schwägr.

= Syrrhopodon =

Genus of mosses in Dicranales

Syrrhopodon is a monophyletic genus of mosses in the family Calymperaceae. It is very similar to Calymperes. The two genera are primarily differentiated by the calyptra, which is dehiscent in Syrrhopodon and persistent in Calymperes.

== Distribution and ecology ==
Syrrhopodon is a pantropical genus, though some species have ranges extending into temperate regions. Of 114 accepted species, 39 are known from the neotropics. Syrrhopodon prefers bark as a substrate, consistent with the preferences of other genera in Calymperaceae.

== Morphology ==
Syrrhopodon is a tufted or gregarious small to medium-sized moss growing with mostly erect stems (rarely repent) that are either simple or variously branched. Leaves are dimorphic (leaves usually grade from vegetative to gemmiferous approaching the stem apex) are usually bordered with elongate hyaline cells and have thickened, variously toothed margins. Leaves generally lack the teniolae cell patterns characteristic of Calymperes, and most Syrrhopodon cells are isodiametric. Costae have two stereid bands in cross-section. Most species are dioicous, rarely monoicous. Generally only 2-3 setae per perichaetium with capsules usually exserted, sometimes immersed, with peristome present or absent. Calyptrae are usually cucullate, sometimes mitrate-campanulate, and deciuous.
