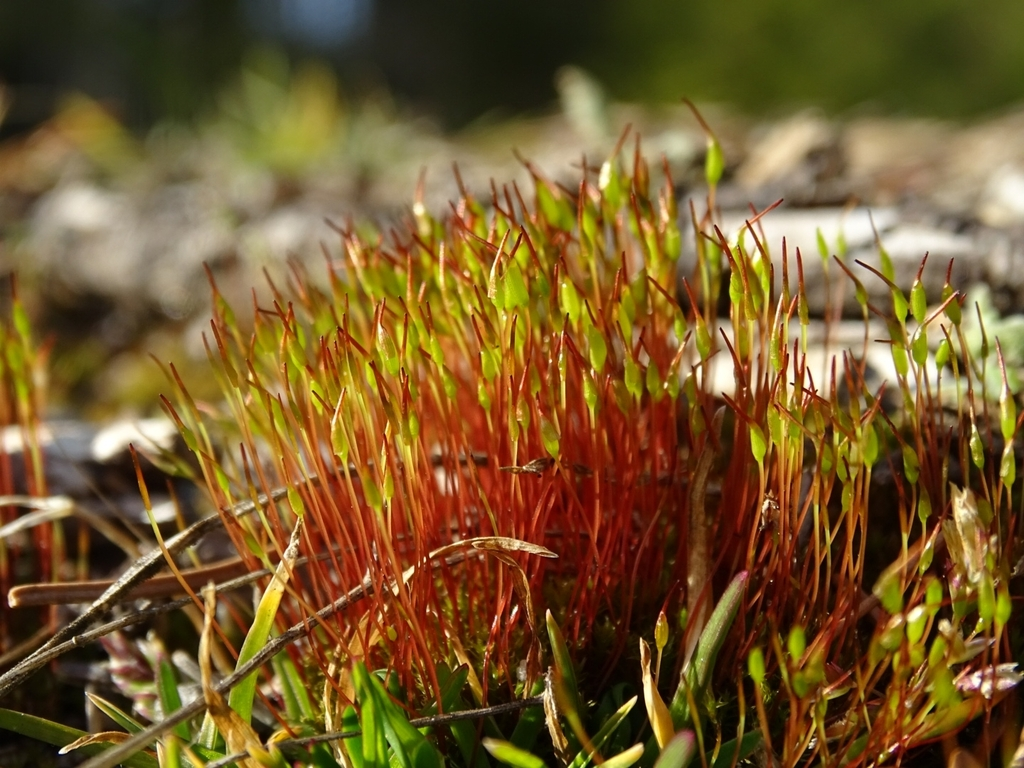
- Ceratodon purpureus

Scientific classification
- Kingdom: Plantae
- Division: Bryophyta
- Class: Bryopsida
- Subclass: Dicranidae
- Order: Ditrichales
- Family: Ditrichaceae
- Genus: Ceratodon; Brid.

= Ceratodon =

Genus of mosses

Ceratodon is a genus of mosses belonging to the family Ditrichaceae. The genus was first described by Samuel Elisée Bridel-Brideri and has a cosmopolitan distribution.

== Species ==
The following species are recognised in the genus Ceratodon:

- Ceratodon amazonum Nieto-Lugilde, O.Werner, S.F.McDaniel & Ros
- Ceratodon bryophilus Besch.
- Ceratodon conicus (Hampe ex Müll.Hal.) Lindb.
- Ceratodon graefii Schlieph.
- Ceratodon heterophyllus Kindb.
- Ceratodon purpureus (Hedw.) Brid.
