= Calymperes schmidtii =

Scientific classification
- Kingdom: Plantae
- Division: Bryophyta
- Class: Bryopsida
- Subclass: Dicranidae
- Order: Dicranales
- Family: Calymperaceae
- Genus: Calymperes
- Species: C. schmidtii

Binomial name
- Calymperes schmidtii Broth.

Species of moss

Calymperes schmidtii is a species of moss. First discovered and mentioned in 1901. No sub-species are listed in the Catalogue of Life.
