= Ditrichum cornubicum =

Conservation status
- Critically Endangered (IUCN 3.1)

Scientific classification
- Kingdom: Plantae
- Division: Bryophyta
- Class: Bryopsida
- Subclass: Dicranidae
- Order: Ditrichales
- Family: Ditrichaceae
- Genus: Ditrichum
- Species: D. cornubicum

Binomial name
- Ditrichum cornubicum Paton

Species of moss

Ditrichum cornubicum, commonly known as the Cornish path-moss, is a moss endemic to Cornwall, United Kingdom. First discovered in 1963, on a roadside west of Lanner, Cornwall by Jean Paton, it has since been found in two other places within Cornwall. It was published as new to science in 1976.

== Distribution, habitat and conservation ==
In 1963, a local bryologist Jean Paton, found an unknown specimen at a roadside to the west of Lanner, near Redruth, in west Cornwall. It was on mine spoil used to surface a small roadside lay-by. It has not been re-found at Lanner but two years later, in 1965 she found the same species at a disused copper mine on the south-east edge of Bodmin Moor at Minions. In 1997 David Holyoak found another population nearby at Crow's Nest. A small population discovered in west Cork, Ireland is likely to have been an accidental introduction from Cornwall and appears to have disappeared. The entire world population of this species at one time only covered only 0.16msq and it was a focus species within the Back from the Brink conservation project which aimed to halt its decline and stop its extinction. The project created over 500 square metres of new habitat for Cornish Path-moss on the edge of Bodmin Moor in Cornwall, and this new habitat is already being colonised by Cornish Path-moss. "Cornish Path Moss" (PDF). Back From The Brink.

== Ecology ==
Only male plants have been found and reproduction is asexual with new plants growing from the leaf axil of rhizoid tubers. The moss is intolerant of competition from other plants and grows on compacted, sparsely vegetated ground, usually on or besides old paths, along tracks, occasionally on banks, as well as the crevices of old walls. The soils are humic or loamy, well drained and acid with a pH of 5.5 – 5.8. It likes a metal-rich substrate with concentrations of copper of 151 – 1400 parts per million (ppm). As the metals slowly leach out of the soil by weathering, other mosses can colonise and out-compete D cornubicum. These mosses include Rhytidiadelphus squarrosus and Ceratodon purpureus.
