= Codonia =

Codonia may refer to two different genera of organisms:

- Codonia Hübner, 1823, a taxonomic synonym for Cyclophora, a genus of moths
- Codonia Dumort., a taxonomic synonym for Fossombronia, a genus of liverworts
