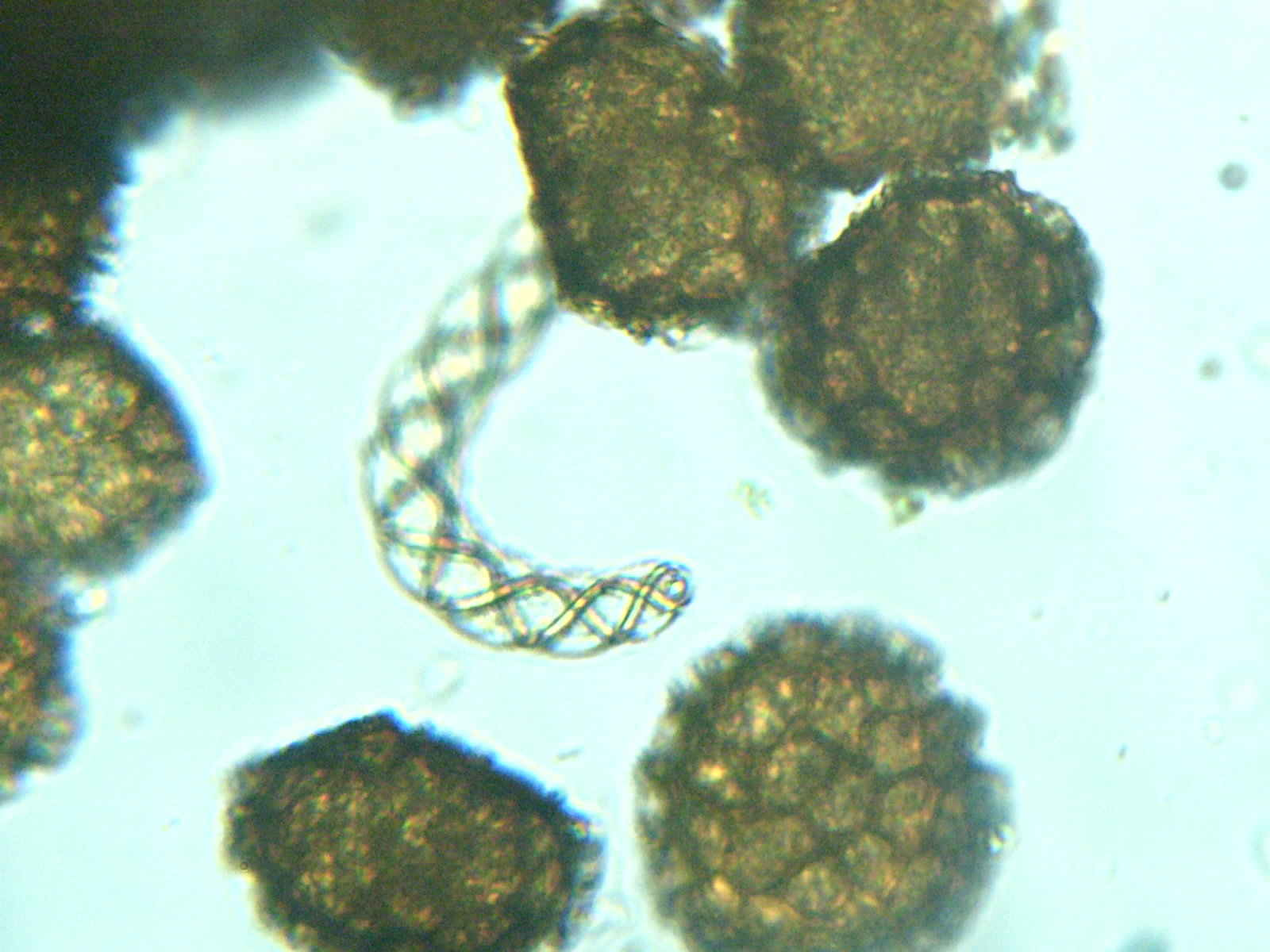
- F. foveolata specimen

Conservation status
- Least Concern (IUCN 3.1) (Europe regional assessment)

Scientific classification
- Kingdom: Plantae
- Clade: Embryophytes
- Division: Marchantiophyta
- Class: Jungermanniopsida
- Order: Fossombroniales
- Family: Fossombroniaceae
- Genus: Fossombronia
- Species: F. foveolata

Binomial name
- Fossombronia foveolata Lindb.

= Fossombronia foveolata =

Species of liverwort

Fossombronia foveolata is a species of liverwort belonging to the family Fossombroniaceae.

It is native to Europe and America.
