= Skottsbergia =

Conservation status
- Endangered (IUCN 2.3)

Scientific classification
- Kingdom: Plantae
- Division: Bryophyta
- Class: Bryopsida
- Subclass: Dicranidae
- Order: Ditrichales
- Family: Ditrichaceae
- Genus: Skottsbergia; Cardot
- Species: S. paradoxa

Binomial name
- Skottsbergia paradoxa Cardot

Genus of haplolepideous moss

Skottsbergia is a monotypic genus, of haplolepideous mosses (Dicranidae) in the family Ditrichaceae containing the single species Skottsbergia paradoxa. It is endemic to Argentina, where it is an endangered species known from just a few locations. It occurs in the southernmost parts of Argentina, growing on South Georgia and Isla Grande de Tierra del Fuego in boggy habitat.

The moss is light green with red setae and it grows up to 10 centimeters tall in some conditions.

The genus was circumscribed by Jules Cardot in Rev. Bryol. vol.32 on page 47 in 1905.

The genus name of Skottsbergia is in honour of Carl Johan Fredrik Skottsberg (1880–1963), who was a Swedish botanist and explorer of Antarctica.
