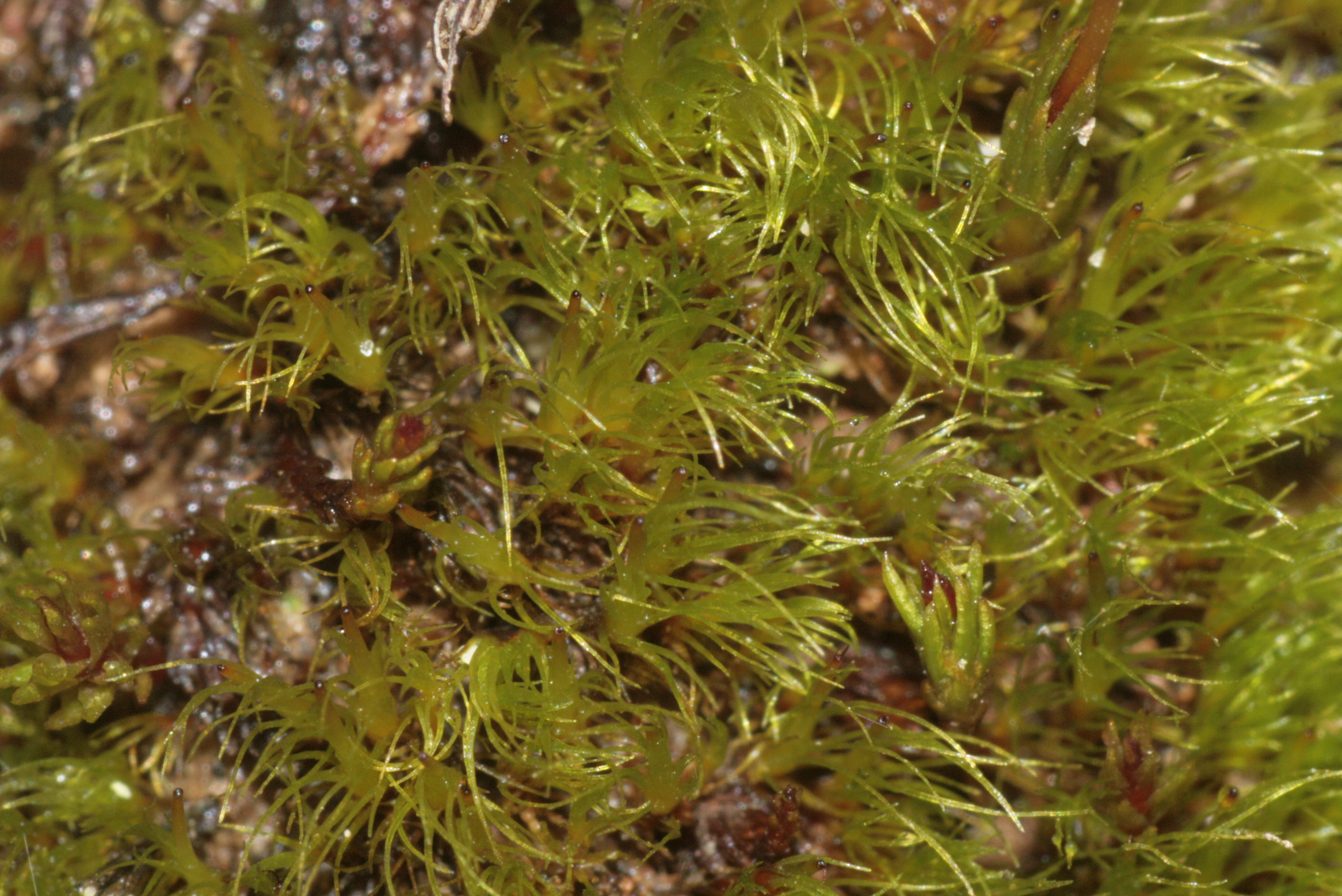
- Ditrichum heteromallum

Scientific classification
- Kingdom: Plantae
- Division: Bryophyta
- Class: Bryopsida
- Subclass: Dicranidae
- Order: Ditrichales
- Family: Ditrichaceae
- Genus: Ditrichum; Hampe

= Ditrichum =

Genus of haplolepideous mosses

Ditrichum is a genus of haplolepideous mosses (Dicranidae) in the family Ditrichaceae.

== Species ==
The genus contains the following species:

- Ditrichum amoenum (Thwaites & Mitt.) Paris
- Ditrichum apophysatum Hampe ex Gangulee
- Ditrichum astomoides Limpr.
- Ditrichum atlanticum (Thér. & Trab.) J.-P. Frahm & Seppelt
- Ditrichum aureum E.B. Bartram
- Ditrichum austrogeorgicum (Cardot) Seppelt
- Ditrichum blindioides Broth.
- Ditrichum bogotense (Hampe) Broth.
- Ditrichum boryanum (Müll. Hal.) Hampe
- Ditrichum brachycarpum Hampe
- Ditrichum brachypodum (Müll. Hal.) Broth.
- Ditrichum breidleri Limpr.
- Ditrichum brevidens Nog.
- Ditrichum brevirostre (R. Br. bis) Broth.
- Ditrichum brevisetum Kiguchi, Tad. Suzuki & Z. Iwats.
- Ditrichum brotherusii (R. Br. bis) Seppelt
- Ditrichum buchananii (R. Br. bis) Broth.
- Ditrichum canadense (Mitt.) Kuntze
- Ditrichum canariense Bryhn
- Ditrichum capense (Müll. Hal.) Kuntze
- Ditrichum capillaceum (Hedw.) Watts & Whitel.
- Ditrichum capillare (Müll. Hal.) Paris
- Ditrichum colijnii Dixon
- Ditrichum conicum (Mont.) Mitt.
- Ditrichum cornubicum Paton
- Ditrichum crinale (Taylor) Kuntze
- Ditrichum cylindricarpum (Müll. Hal.) F. Muell.
- Ditrichum darjeelingense Renauld & Cardot
- Ditrichum difficile (Duby) M. Fleisch.
- Ditrichum ditrichoideum (Cardot) Ochyra
- Ditrichum divaricatum Mitt.
- Ditrichum elongatum (Hook. f. & Wilson) Mitt.
- Ditrichum ferrugineum (Wilson) Paris
- Ditrichum flexicaule (Schwägr.) Hampe
- Ditrichum fontanum Herzog
- Ditrichum francii Thér.
- Ditrichum gemmiferum Ochyra & Lewis-Smith
- Ditrichum glaciale (Müll. Hal.) Kuntze
- Ditrichum glowackii Podp.
- Ditrichum gracile (Mitt.) Kuntze
- Ditrichum hallei Cardot & Broth.
- Ditrichum heteromallum (Hedw.) E. Britton
- Ditrichum hookeri (Müll. Hal.) Hampe
- Ditrichum hyalinocuspidatum Cardot
- Ditrichum hyalinum (Mitt.) Kuntze
- Ditrichum immersum Zanten
- Ditrichum itatiaiae (Müll. Hal.) Paris
- Ditrichum javense M. Fleisch.
- Ditrichum julaceum (Dozy & Molk.) I. Hagen
- Ditrichum knappii (Jur.) Limpr.
- Ditrichum laxissimum (Mitt.) Kuntze
- Ditrichum levieri (Herzog) Hilp.
- Ditrichum lewis-smithii Ochyra
- Ditrichum liliputanum (Müll. Hal.) Paris
- Ditrichum lineare (Sw.) Lindb.
- Ditrichum longisetum (Lorentz) Hampe
- Ditrichum luteum Dixon & Thér.
- Ditrichum macounii (Müll. Hal. & Kindb.) Kindb.
- Ditrichum macrorhynchum Broth.
- Ditrichum madagassum (Renauld & Cardot) Paris
- Ditrichum mexicanum (Schimp. ex Besch.) Kuntze
- Ditrichum mittenii (Besch.) Kuntze
- Ditrichum montanum Leiberg
- Ditrichum nivale (Müll. Hal.) Limpr.
- Ditrichum oblongum (Lindb.) Kindb.
- Ditrichum oldfieldii (Mitt.) Mitt.
- Ditrichum pancheri (Müll. Hal.) Paris
- Ditrichum paulense Geh. & Hampe
- Ditrichum perporodictyon Dixon
- Ditrichum pinetorum (Müll. Hal.) Paris
- Ditrichum plagiacron (Müll. Hal.) Kuntze
- Ditrichum plicatum (Müll. Hal.) Hampe
- Ditrichum plumbicola Crundw.
- Ditrichum praealtum (Mitt.) Kuntze
- Ditrichum pseudorufescens (Müll. Hal.) Paris
- Ditrichum punctulatum Mitt.
- Ditrichum pusillum (Hedw.) Hampe
- Ditrichum rhynchostegium Kindb.
- Ditrichum roivanenii E.B. Bartram & Roiv.
- Ditrichum rufescens (Hampe) Hampe
- Ditrichum rufo-aureum (Hampe) J. H. Willis
- Ditrichum schimperi (Lesq.) Kuntze
- Ditrichum sekii Ando & Deguchi ex Matsui & Z. Iwats.
- Ditrichum semilunare (Müll. Hal.) Paris
- Ditrichum sericeum E.B. Bartram
- Ditrichum spinulosum Dixon
- Ditrichum strictiusculum (Müll. Hal.) Paris
- Ditrichum strictum (Hook. f. & Wilson) Hampe
- Ditrichum subaustrale Broth.
- Ditrichum subcapillaceum (Müll. Hal.) Watts & Whitel.
- Ditrichum submersum Cardot & Herzog
- Ditrichum subrufescens Broth.
- Ditrichum subulatum Hampe
- Ditrichum tenue (Hedw.) Hampe
- Ditrichum tenuifolium Lindb.
- Ditrichum tenuinerve Dixon
- Ditrichum tisserantii P. de la Varde
- Ditrichum tomentosum (Kindb.) Paris
- Ditrichum tortipes (Mitt.) Kuntze
- Ditrichum tortuloides Grout
- Ditrichum ulei (Müll. Hal.) Paris
- Ditrichum validinervium Kaal.
- Ditrichum viride (Müll. Hal.) Paris
