= Wilsoniella (plant) =

Scientific classification
- Kingdom: Plantae
- Division: Bryophyta
- Class: Bryopsida
- Subclass: Dicranidae
- Order: Ditrichales
- Family: Ditrichaceae
- Genus: Wilsoniella; Müll.Hal.

Genus of mosses

Wilsoniella is a genus of mosses belonging to the family Ditrichaceae.

Species:

- Wilsoniella blindioides (Broth.) Sainsbury
- Wilsoniella bornensis Broth.
