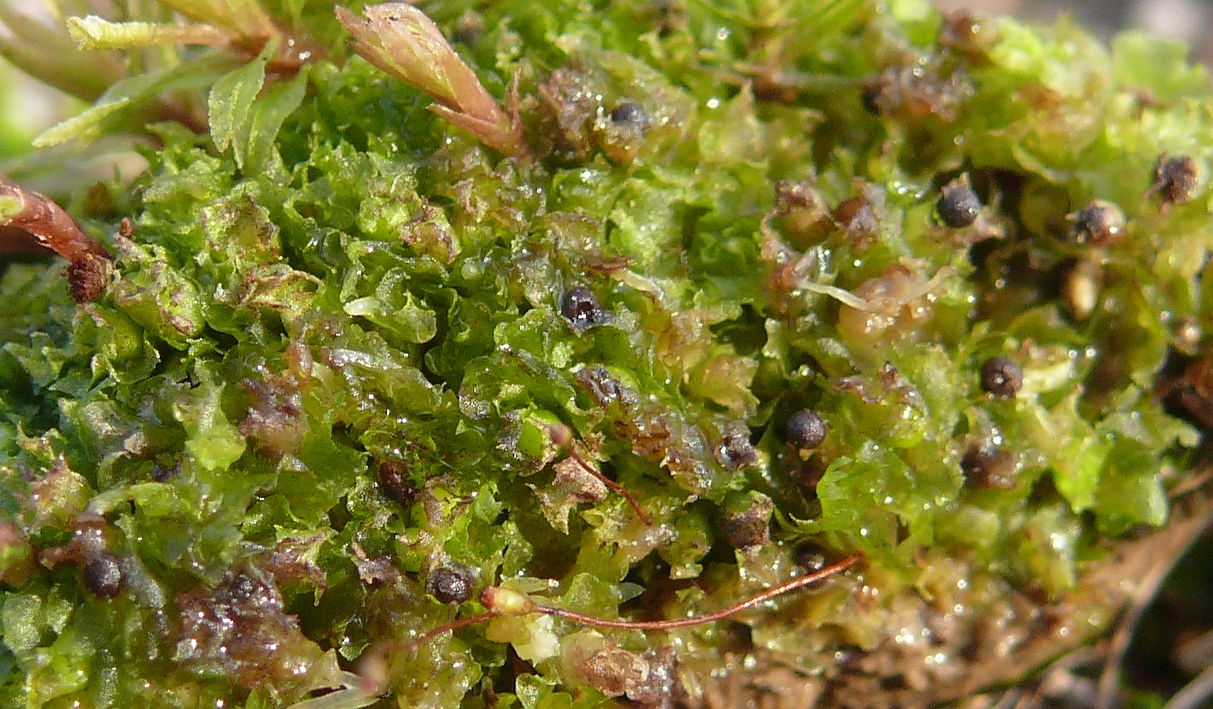

Scientific classification
- Kingdom: Plantae
- Division: Marchantiophyta
- Class: Jungermanniopsida
- Order: Fossombroniales
- Family: Fossombroniaceae
- Genus: Fossombronia; Raddi

Synonyms
- List: Codonia Dumort.; Fossombronia subgen. Simodon Lindb.; Maurocenia Léman; Maurocenius Gray; Simodon (Lindb.) Lindb.

= Fossombronia =

Genus of liverworts

Fossombronia is a genus of liverworts belonging to the family Fossombroniaceae. It was first described by Giuseppe Raddi in 1818. The genus has a cosmopolitan distribution.

== Species ==
The following species are recognised in the genus Fossombronia:

- Fossombronia alaskana Steere & Inoue
- Fossombronia alata G.A.M. Scott & D.C. Pike
- Fossombronia altilamellosa G.A.M. Scott & D.C. Pike
- Fossombronia angulifolia Perold
- Fossombronia angulosa (Dicks.) Raddi
- Fossombronia areolata G.A.M. Scott & D.C. Pike
- Fossombronia auricolor G.A.M. Scott & D.C. Pike
- Fossombronia australis Mitt.
- Fossombronia bracchia Cargill
- Fossombronia caespitiformis (Raddi) De Not. ex Rabenh.
- Fossombronia caledonica Steph.
- Fossombronia cederbergensis Perold
- Fossombronia cerebriformis G.A.M. Scott & D.C. Pike
- Fossombronia crassifolia Spruce
- Fossombronia crispa Nees
- Fossombronia crispula (Brot.) R.M. Schust.
- Fossombronia cristula Austin
- Fossombronia cultriformis G.A.M. Scott & D.C. Pike
- Fossombronia delgadilloana Crand.-Stotl., Stotler & J.C. Benavides
- Fossombronia densa G.A.M. Scott & D.C. Pike
- Fossombronia densilamellata S.W. Arnell
- Fossombronia echinata Macvicar
- Fossombronia elsieae Perold
- Fossombronia fernandeziensis Steph.
- Fossombronia fimbriata Paton
- Fossombronia fleischeri Osterwald
- Fossombronia foveolata Lindb.
- Fossombronia fuhreri G.A.M. Scott & D.C. Pike
- Fossombronia gemmifera Perold
- Fossombronia glenii Perold
- Fossombronia grandis Steph.
- Fossombronia gregaria Colenso
- Fossombronia grossepapillata Steph.
- Fossombronia hahnii Frank Müll.
- Fossombronia hamatohirta Steph.
- Fossombronia hewsoniae G.A.M. Scott & D.C. Pike
- Fossombronia himalayensis Kashyap
- Fossombronia hyalorhiza Perold
- Fossombronia incurva Lindb.
- Fossombronia indica Steph.
- Fossombronia integerrima Steph.
- Fossombronia integrifolia Steph.
- Fossombronia intestinalis Taylor
- Fossombronia isaloensis Cargill & D.A. Callaghan
- Fossombronia japonica Schiffn.
- Fossombronia jostii Crand.-Stotl. & Gradst.
- Fossombronia laciniata G.A.M. Scott & D.C. Pike
- Fossombronia lamellata Steph.
- Fossombronia leucoxantha (Lehm.) Gottsche, Lindenb. & Nees
- Fossombronia longiseta (Austin) Austin
- Fossombronia lophoclada Spruce
- Fossombronia lophoscypha Hässel
- Fossombronia luetzelburgiana K.I. Goebel
- Fossombronia macrocalyx Steph.
- Fossombronia macrophylla Colenso
- Fossombronia magnaspora G.A.M. Scott & D.C. Pike
- Fossombronia marindae Perold
- Fossombronia maritima (Paton) Paton
- Fossombronia marshii J.R. Bray & Stotler
- Fossombronia microlamellata G.A.M. Scott & D.C. Pike
- Fossombronia mittenii Tind.
- Fossombronia montaguensis S.W. Arnell
- Fossombronia monticola Perold
- Fossombronia myrioides Inoue
- Fossombronia nigricaulis Colenso
- Fossombronia nyikaensis Perold
- Fossombronia papillata Steph.
- Fossombronia paranapanemae Schiffn. ex S.W. Arnell
- Fossombronia peruviana Gottsche & Hampe
- Fossombronia porphyrorhiza (Nees) Prosk.
- Fossombronia pseudointestinalis Cargill
- Fossombronia pulvinata Steph.
- Fossombronia punctata G.A.M. Scott & D.C. Pike
- Fossombronia purpureospora G.A.M. Scott & D.C. Pike
- Fossombronia pusilla (L.) Nees
- Fossombronia renateae Perold
- Fossombronia reticulata Steph.
- Fossombronia rosulata Colenso
- Fossombronia rudis G.A.M. Scott & D.C. Pike
- Fossombronia ruminata Cargill
- Fossombronia rupestris G.A.M. Scott & D.C. Pike
- Fossombronia rwandaensis Perold
- Fossombronia scrobiculata G.A.M. Scott & D.C. Pike
- Fossombronia spinifolia Steph.
- Fossombronia stephanii Schiffn. ex Steph.
- Fossombronia straussiana Perold
- Fossombronia subsaccata Steph.
- Fossombronia swaziensis Perold
- Fossombronia tesselata G.A.M. Scott & D.C. Pike
- Fossombronia texana Lindb.
- Fossombronia truncata G.A.M. Scott & D.C. Pike
- Fossombronia tumida Mitt.
- Fossombronia valparaisiana Hässel
- Fossombronia vermiculata G.A.M. Scott & D.C. Pike
- Fossombronia wattsii Steph.
- Fossombronia wondraczekii (Corda) Dumort. ex Lindb.
- Fossombronia wrightii Austin
- Fossombronia zuurbergensis Perold
