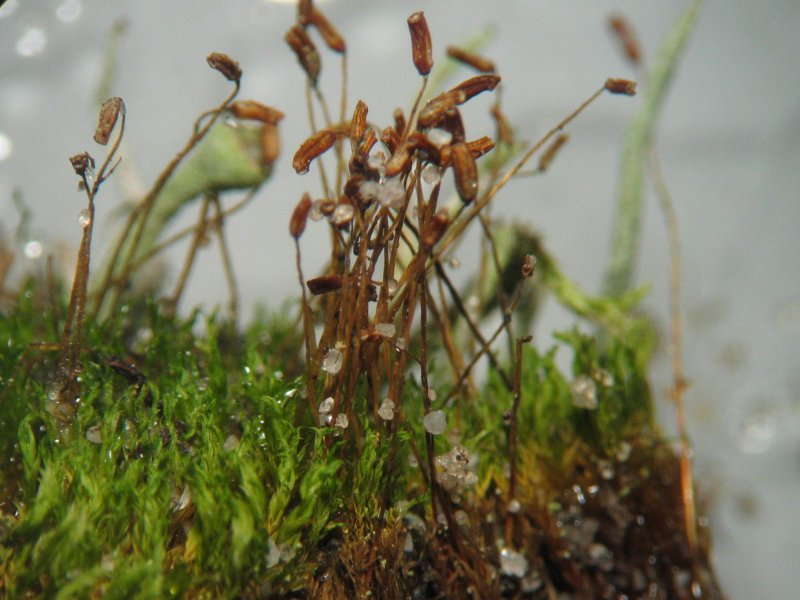

Scientific classification
- Kingdom: Plantae
- Division: Bryophyta
- Class: Bryopsida
- Subclass: Dicranidae
- Order: Ditrichales
- Family: Ditrichaceae
- Genus: Ceratodon
- Species: C. purpureus

Binomial name
- Ceratodon purpureus (Hedw.) Brid.

Synonyms
- Ceratodon dimorphus Mielichhoferia recurvifolia.

= Ceratodon purpureus =

Species of moss

Ceratodon purpureus is a dioicous moss with a color ranging from yellow-green to red. The height amounts to 3 centimeters. It is found worldwide, mainly in urban areas and next to roads on dry sand soils. It can grow in a very wide variety of habitats, from polluted highway shoulders and mine tailings to areas recently denuded by wildfire to the bright slopes of Antarctica. Its common names include fire moss, redshank, purple forkmoss, ceratodon moss, and purple horn toothed moss.

== Description ==
Fire moss is a short moss that forms dense tufts or sometimes cushions. The stems are erect, usually about 0.5 inch (1.3 cm) long. The upper 0.19 inch (0.5 cm) is current year's growth; often slightly branched by forking at the tip of the old growth. The stems sometimes become 2.4 to 3.1 inches (7–8 cm) long in shaded places. Leaves are short and hairlike, spreading when moist; somewhat folded or twisted when dry.

Fire moss contains photoprotective pigments, which are a useful adaptation for the bright Antarctic environment. Leaf pigment varies from green to ginger.

== Distribution and habitat ==
Fire moss likely occurs in every country but is possibly replaced by closely related taxa in tropical latitudes. It is widespread throughout Canada, where it occurs in every province and territory. It occurs in every state in the United States.

Fire moss can tolerate much higher pollution levels than other mosses. It is common in urban and industrial environments subjected to a variety of pollutants, along highways, and on the tailings and refuse associated with both coal and heavy-metal mining activities.

Fire moss is often found on disturbed sites. It occurs on a wide range of substrates including soil, rock, wood, humus, old roofs, sand, and cracks of sidewalks. It is most abundant on exposed, compact, mineral, dry, gravelly or sandy soils but tolerates a wide range of soil textures. Sand dunes close to water in Scotland are colonized by fire moss, which grows between the shoots of grasses.

== Life cycle ==
Fire moss is dioecious, reproducing generatively with spores and vegetatively through protonemata. The capsules are held horizontally on the end of a long seta (fruit stalk). Fire moss generally fruits abundantly. Wind is the main method of spore dispersal.

Spore germination in fire moss is a two-phase process. Spores first swell then distend. Usually the setae are present in great numbers in the colony; with changes in humidity they twist and untwist. This movement helps to jerk the capsules, helping in spore discharge. Possibly the contraction of the grooves in the capsule at maturity also helps to squeeze out the spores. Spores of fire moss have remained viable even after drying for 16 years.

Fire moss reproduces vegetatively via protonemata (threadlike or platelike growths).

Fire moss sporophytes appear early in the spring, as soon as the snow melts. In March, the setae reach their full height and begin to turn from green to red. Capsules mature by late spring. By midsummer the capsules often decay, and the setae break from the moss.

=== Microarthropod-mediated fertilization ===
A 2012 study found that male and female fire moss emit different and complex volatile organic scents. Female plants emit more compounds than male plants. Springtails were found to choose female plants preferentially, and the study found that the springtails enhance moss fertilization. The results seem to suggest a plant-pollinator relationship analogous to those found in flowering plants.

== Ecology ==
Fire moss prefers low competition and high light; however, it is somewhat shade tolerant, and has, for example, been reported to grow in artificially illuminated caves. It is a colonizer of disturbed sites and readily invades mineral soil by spores. Fire moss is typically found associated with other species characteristic of disturbed sites such as fireweed (Epilobium angustifolium) and pearly everlasting (Anaphalis margaritacea). Fire moss is often replaced by flowering plants in later stages of succession. In the black spruce (Picea mariana)-lichen woodlands of Alaska and Canada, the first stage of revegetation, which lasts from 1 to 20 years, is dominated by pioneer mosses such as fire moss. Fire moss continues to increase in the early part of the shrub stage but begins to decrease toward the end of this stage.

Fire moss will colonize burned areas through lightweight, off-site, wind-dispersed spores. High-severity fire, which exposes mineral soil, provides ideal conditions for the germination of fire moss spores. Fire moss is often the dominant vegetation for several years following high-severity fire. It produces few spores late in the first postfire year and many in the second. If fire takes place in early spring; gametophores can develop in 4 to 5 months. If the fire takes place in the fall, colonization is slower.
