= Queen's College, Melbourne =

College of University of Melbourne, Victoria, Australia

Queen's College
- University of Melbourne
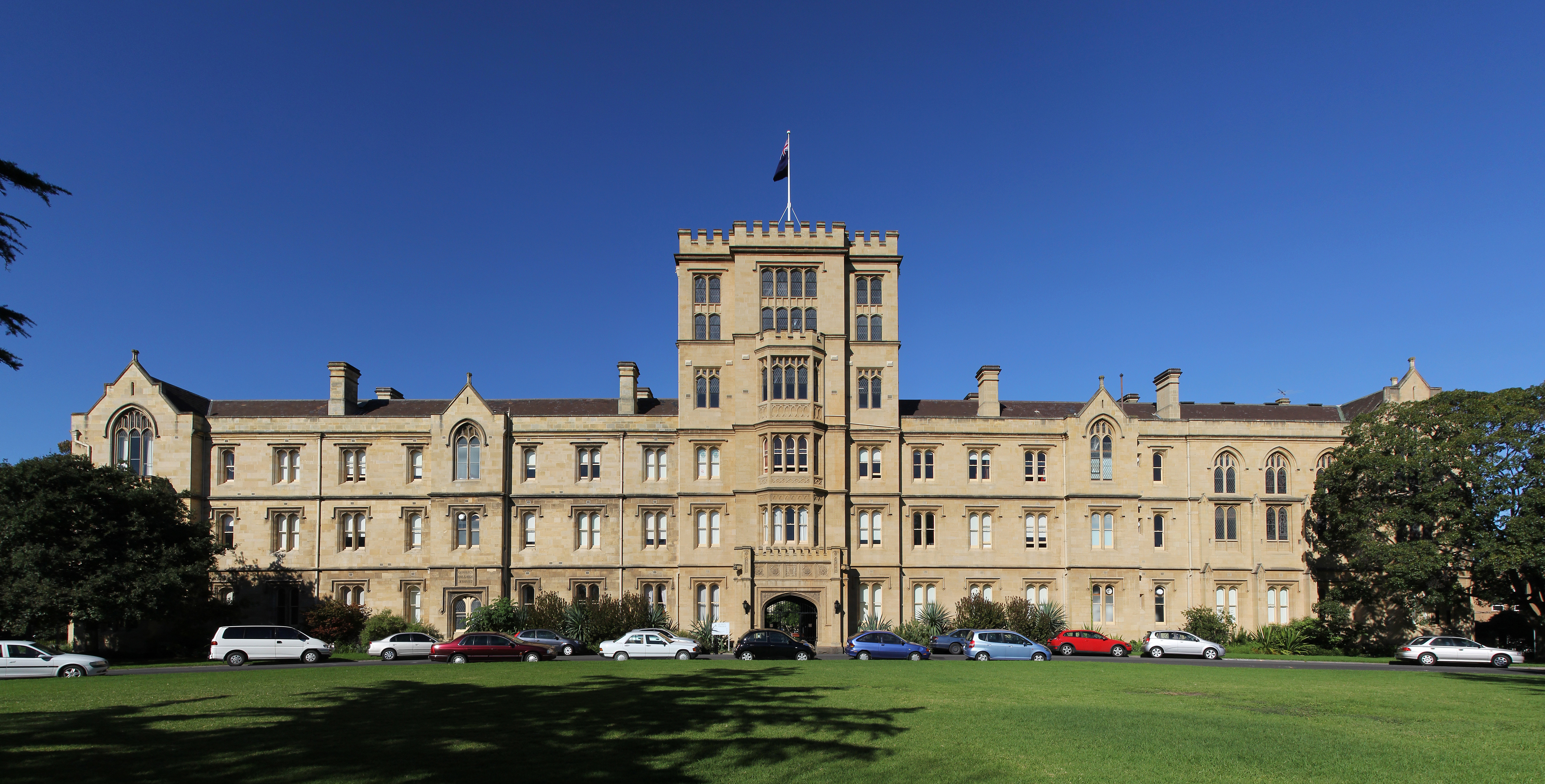

- Queens College Crest
- Location: 1-17 College Crescent, Parkville, Victoria
- Coordinates: 37.7935°S 144.9635°E
- Motto: Aedificamus in aeternum (Latin)
- Motto in English: Building for eternity
- Founder: William Abraham Quick
- Established: 1887
- Named for: Queen Victoria's golden jubilee
- Master: Dr Michael Stepniak
- President: Cassandra Silberberg (2025)
- Undergraduates: 275
- Postgraduates: 25
- Website: Website

Queen's College is a residential college affiliated with the University of Melbourne. It is a residential community of 300 students who attend the University of Melbourne, RMIT University, Victorian College of the Arts and Monash University's Faculty of Pharmacy and Pharmaceutical Sciences. These students come from across regional Victoria, interstate and overseas. Queen's College also houses a number of resident tutors, staff and academic guests.

The College provides accommodation, academic and pastoral support, social and cultural activities, and well-being and career development programs. Queen's participates in the Intercollegiate sports and cultural programs.

Alumni of Queen's College are referred to as Wyverns (referencing the Wyvern on the College crest). The College runs regular Wyvern events throughout the year including reunions, educational and cultural events. In addition, many Wyverns support the College by tutoring current students, acting as mentors (academic and career) or coaching the student sport teams.

== History ==
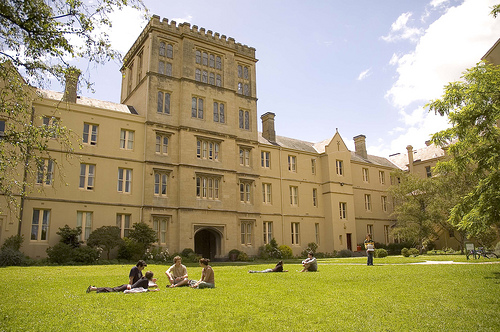
Queen's College quad from inside the College grounds

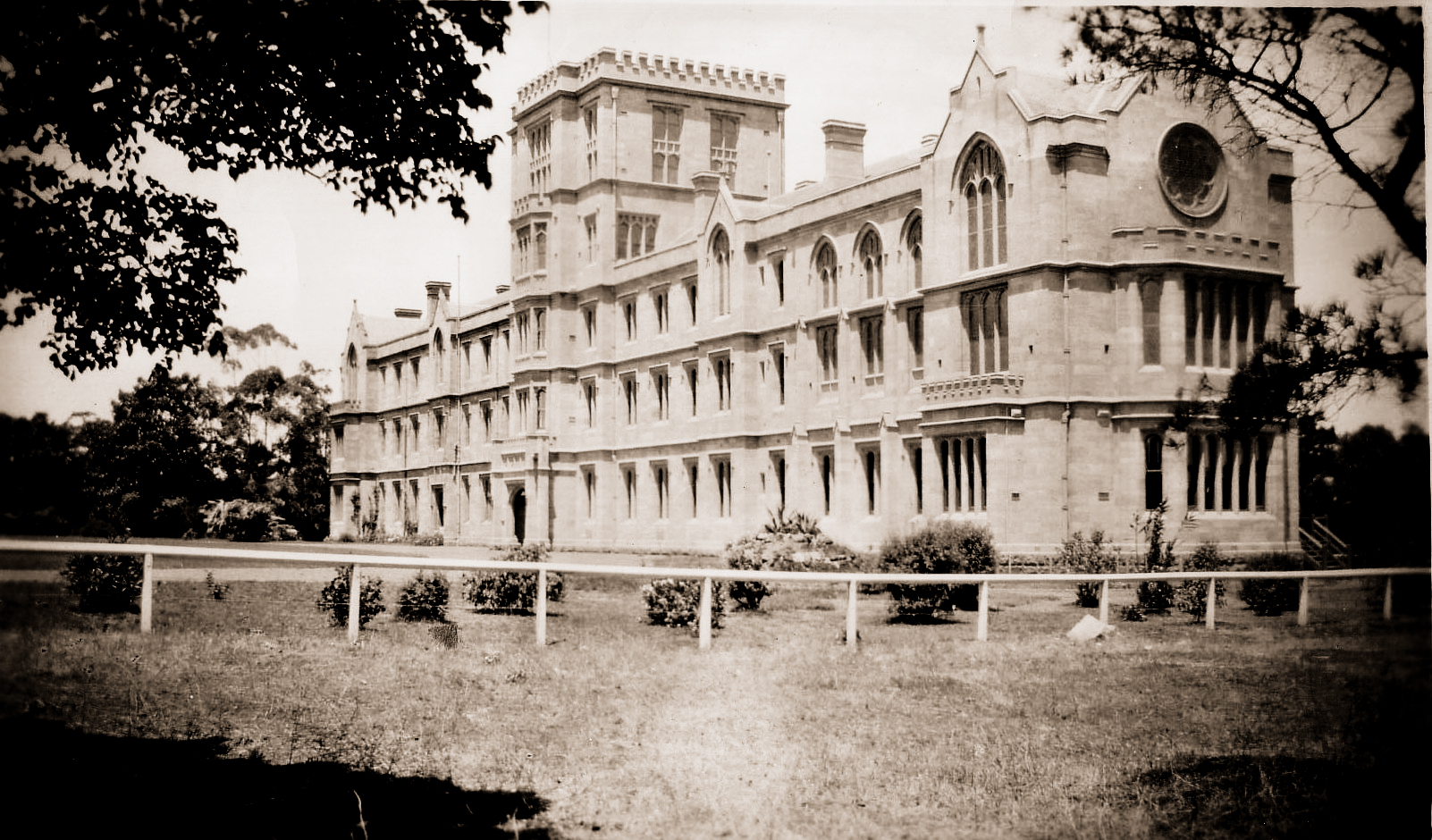
Queen's College North Wing c.1926

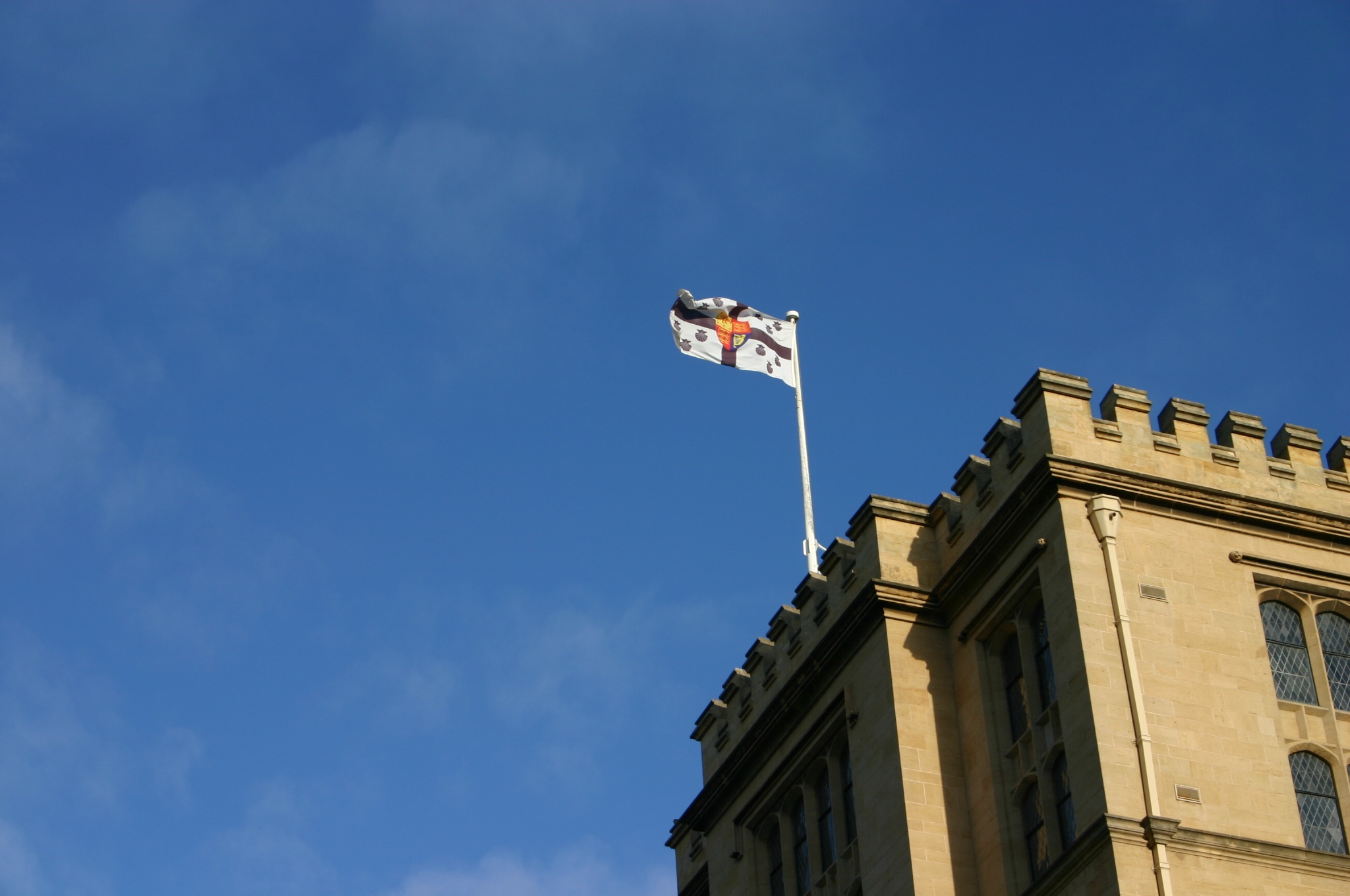
Queen's College iconic tower and flag

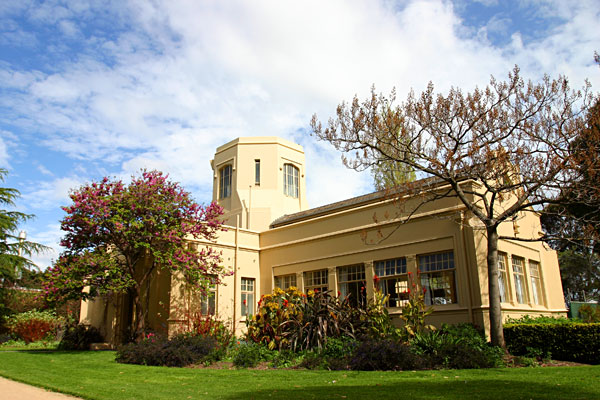
Queen's College Nicholas Laboratories

=== Founding ===
The college was founded in 1887, on 10 acres (40,000 m^{2}) of land assigned to the Methodist Church by the Parliament of Victoria in the area then known as University Reserve (now College Crescent). While this land was allocated soon after the founding of the university in 1853, it was not until 1878—some twenty-five years later—that the Methodist Conference took the first steps towards building the college.

The Governor of Victoria, Sir Henry Loch, laid the foundation stone on 16 June 1887 after the efforts of the Reverend William Abraham Quick, who is widely regarded as the founder of Queen's.

=== Naming ===
Initially, it was decided that the college was to be named Victoria College. However, when it became clear that it was to be built in the year of Queen Victoria's golden jubilee, it was finalised in December 1886: "That the new College be called Queen's College in honour of the Queen's Jubilee"

=== Opening ===
Queen's opened its doors on 16 March 1889, with a total of 24 students, under the leadership of the Revd Edward Holdsworth Sugden, who would go on to hold the position of master for over forty years. Shortly afterward, it became clear that more building was necessary, and on 20 April 1890, the South Wing was opened. Subsequent extensions were made in 1905 and in 1910 a new East Wing was created, joining the new southern wing with the original sections.

During this time (from 1897 to 1920), it is noted that "Queen's College was a veritable hothouse of dramatic activity", with plays and soirees being performed several times annually. Melbourne University Student Theatre traces its roots to this time, and it is no wonder that promotional posters from these productions still adorn the walls of the college to this day.

=== Expansion ===
Post-Great War pressures nurtured additional building plans, advocated mainly by J. T. Tweddle. The central tower (named the Sugden tower after the first master of the college, the Revd Edward J. Holdsworth Sugden) and a new northern wing, known as the Tweddle Wing, were constructed and completed in 1923. 1930 saw the introduction of a scientific laboratory (which now serves as a student recreation centre) in the southern section of the college, courtesy of A. M. and G. R. Nicholas.

From 1958 to 1978, a significant expansion and improvement programme was enacted, partly funded by the Commonwealth Government. The West Wing (formerly the Raynor C. Johnson Wing, named after the college's third master) erected in the west of the college grounds, was completed in two stages. The first opened in 1961, with the second following eight years later. During the construction of the West Wing, it became clear that the dining hall (which now serves as the Junior Common Room) was too small to contain the projected student body. As such, the current Eakins Hall was built, finished in 1964. The final student accommodation building, Kernick House, was completed in 1975.

In 1964, 3 acres (12,000 m^{2}) of college land was allocated for the creation of a women's college. The college, named St Hilda's, is now a coeducational facility as by the time it was completed Queen's was also accepting both men and women as equal members.

For a decade from 1969, Queen's had also been ensuring that the pre-existing facilities would attain the same standard as the new wing. The resulting "comfortable, single bedroom studies" remain much the same format today. Also around this time, the Methodist Church merged with most parishes of the Presbyterian Church to form the Uniting Church in Australia, of which the college became an institution.

Coinciding with the college's centenary celebrations, the new Featonby Library and several tutor flats contained in Parnaby Wing were opened in 1987. More recently, the college has focused on expanding accommodation for academic visitors, postgraduate students and resident tutors, with the construction of Scott Terrace(1998), Jack Clarke and Lapthorne buildings (2000). In 2012, the Honourable Alex Chernov AC QC, Governor of Victoria, official opened two new wings of graduate accommodation with facilities for 54 graduate residences.

=== Traditions ===
Every Wednesday is Formal Dinner where Queen's College students wear their black academic gowns during dinner at Eakins dining hall.

The "spoon-bang" is still observed with vigor at the start of formal dinners to celebrate the winning of Queen's College teams in sports, cultural and academic competitions.

== Arms ==
The college's coat of arms celebrates its founding as a Methodist institution, in the tradition of the 18th-century Anglican cleric John Wesley. It has the following heraldic description:

Argent, a cross sable, in each quarter three escallops of the last, for Wesley; on an escutcheon of pretence the Royal Arms of England. Crest: on a wreath and sable, a wyvern proper. Motto: Aedificamus in aeternum.

The actual rendering of the escutcheon uses the royal arms not of England but of the United Kingdom. This is superimposed on the arms of John Wesley.

The college motto translates to "We build for eternity".

The arms were assumed without a formal grant from the College of Arms.

== Masters, Head of College, Vice-Masters, Deans and Deputy Heads ==
=== Masters ===
- The Revd Edward Sugden (1887 - 1928)
- The Revd Frederick Walwyn Kernick (1929 - 1933)
- John F. Foster (1933 - 1934) - acting master
- Raynor Johnson (1934 - 1964)
- The Revd Norman Edgar Lade (1964 - 1965) - acting master
- Owen Parnaby (1966 - 1986)
- George A.M. Scott, FLS (1986 - 1992)
- Jack William Clarke, OAM (1992) - acting master
- The Revd John A. Henley, (1993 - 2001)
- David T. Runia, FAHA (2002 – 2016)
- Dr Stewart Gill, OAM (2017 - 2024)

=== Master and Head of College ===
- Dr Michael Stepniak (2025 - present)

=== Vice-masters ===
- Jack Clarke (1964 - 1989)
- Philip Creed (1989 - 1991)
- Robert Nethercote (1991 - 2002)
- Phillip Mosley (2002 - 2014)

=== Deans and Deputy Head ===
From 2015, the Vice-Master role was replaced with two Dean positions.

Dean of Student Wellbeing

- Dr Tim Corney (2015 - 2016)

Dean of Students

- Jacob Workman (2017 - 2019)

Dean of Studies

- Dr Brenda Holt (2015 - 2016)
- Dr Sally Dalton-Brown (2017 - 2019)

From 2019, the two Dean positions were combined into one Dean position.

- Dr Sally Dalton-Brown (2019-2021)
- Campbell Bairstow (2021) [Acting]
- Dr Lesa Scholl (2021-2024)
- Campbell Bairstow (2024-2025) [Acting]
- Dr Catherine Sicurella (2025-2026) [Acting]

From 2026, the Dean was amended to the Dean and Deputy Head of College.

- Nicholas Spinks (2026 - )

== Notable alumni ==
Queen's College alumni (those who have lived on campus for six months or more) are referred to as Wyverns (referencing the College crest).

Notable Wyverns include:

- Geoffrey Blainey AC, FAHA, FASSA (Australian historian)
- Cyril P. Callister (inventor of Vegemite)
- Merlin Crossley AM (molecular biologist, Deputy Vice-Chancellor (DVC) Academic Quality and Acting DVC Research and Enterprise at the University of New South Wales)
- Mary De Garis (doctor, second woman in Victoria to be awarded the Doctorate of Medicine)
- Sir Frederic Eggleston (politician, former Attorney-General of Victoria and Australian Ambassador to the United States)
- John Holland AC (engineer, founded John Holland Construction Group)
- Harold Holt CH (politician, former Prime Minister of Australia)
- Alan Hopgood AM (writer and actor)
- Brian Howe AO (politician, former Deputy Prime Minister of Australia)
- Mustapa Mohamed (politician, former Minister of Trade of Malaysia)
- Ismail Abdul Rahman (politician, former Deputy Prime Minister of Malaysia)
- David Penington AC (doctor, former Vice-Chancellor of the University of Melbourne, former dean of its School of Medicine)
- Sir Ian Potter (stockbroker, businessman and philanthropist)
- Red Symons (musician, comedian and television personality)
- Ellen Sandell (politician, Leader of the Victorian Greens)
- Rod Sims AO (economist, past Australian Competition & Consumer Commission chairman)
- Kathy Watt (cyclist, Olympian)
- Roy Wright (physiologist, former Chancellor of the University of Melbourne)

=== Rhodes Scholars ===
- Peter H. Bailey AM OBE, Queen's 1945, Rhodes Scholar 1950
- Samuel Edward Keith Hulme AM QC, Queen's Counsel; Rhodes Scholar (1952)
- John R. Howes, Queen’s 1953, Rhodes Scholar 1957
- Wilfrid R. Prest, Queen’s 1959, Rhodes Scholar 1962
- Michael C. Garner, Queen’s 1978, Rhodes Scholar 1984
- P. Merlin Crossley, Queen’s 1982, Rhodes Scholar 1987
- Matt Wenham, Queen’s 2004, Rhodes Scholar 2004.
- Michiel le Roux, Queen's 2003, Rhodes Scholar 2006
