= Crow's Nest, Cornwall =

Village in Cornwall, England

Coordinates: 50.4981°N 4.4493°W

Crow's Nest is a village in Cornwall, England. It is located within the civil parish of St Cleer, on the southeastern edge of Bodmin Moor, 3 miles (4.8 km) north of the town of Liskeard.

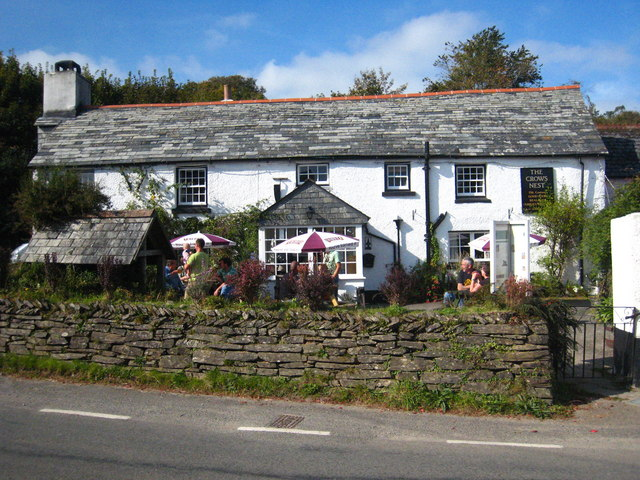
The Crow's Nest public house

A Site of Special Scientific Interest, also named Crow's Nest, is located 200m north of the village. It is noted for its geological interest, as well as various species of moss, specifically for being one of only two sites in the world where Cornish path moss (Ditrichum cornubicum) grows, a distinction it shares with the Phoenix United Mine, also located in Cornwall. The SSSI also forms part of Phoenix United Mine and Crow's Nest Special Area of Conservation.

Part of the land designated as Crow's Nest Site of Special Scientific Interest is owned by the Ministry of Defence.
