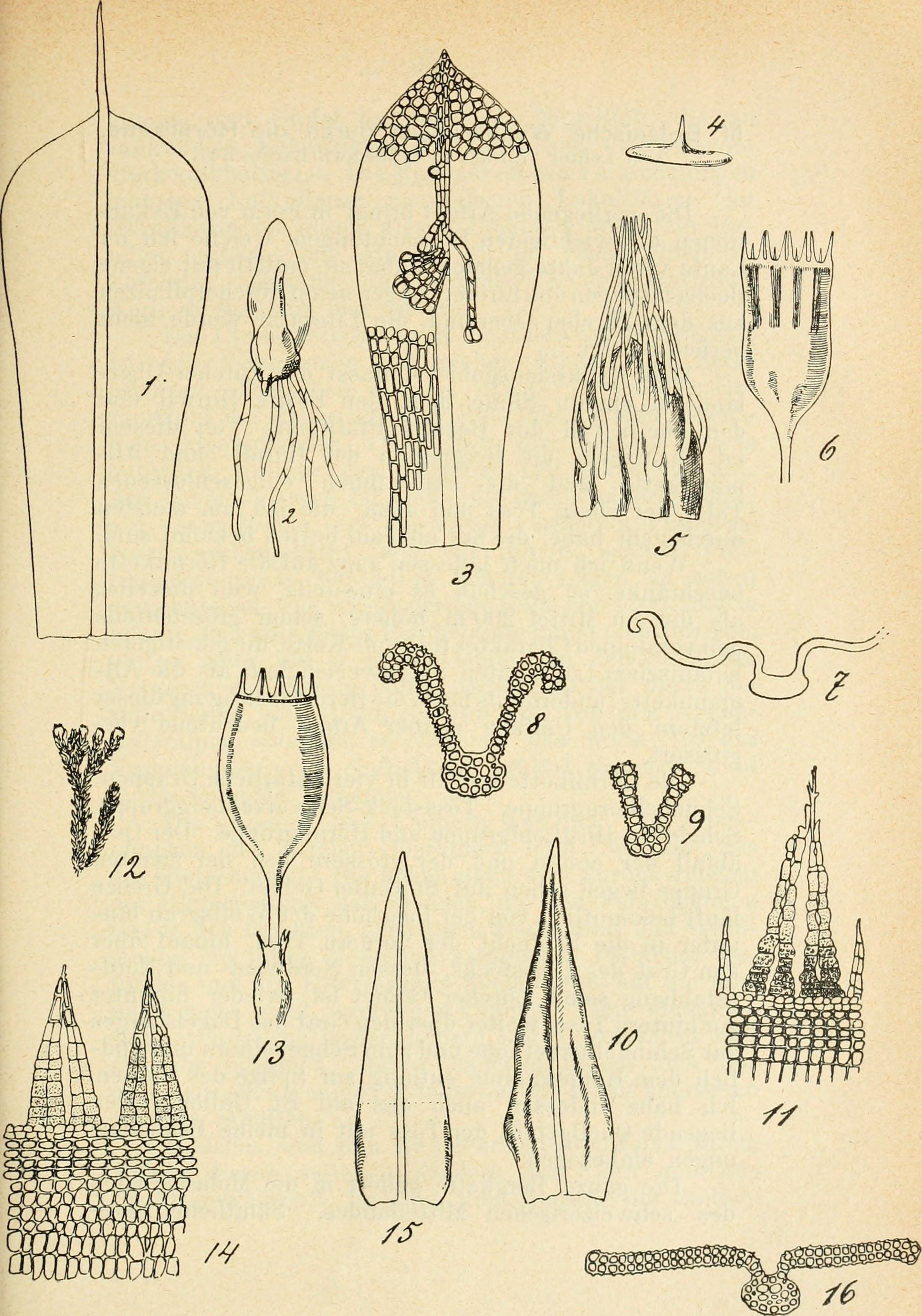

Scientific classification
- Kingdom: Plantae
- Division: Bryophyta
- Class: Bryopsida
- Subclass: Dicranidae
- Order: Pottiales
- Family: Pottiaceae
- Genus: Pottia; Ehrh. ex Fürnr.

= Pottia =

Genus of mosses

Pottia is a genus of mosses belonging to the family Pottiaceae.

The genus has cosmopolitan distribution.

Species:

- Pottia acaulis (Flörke ex F.Weber & D.Mohr) Fürnr. ex Hampe
- Pottia affinis (Hook. & Taylor) Herrnst. & Heyn
