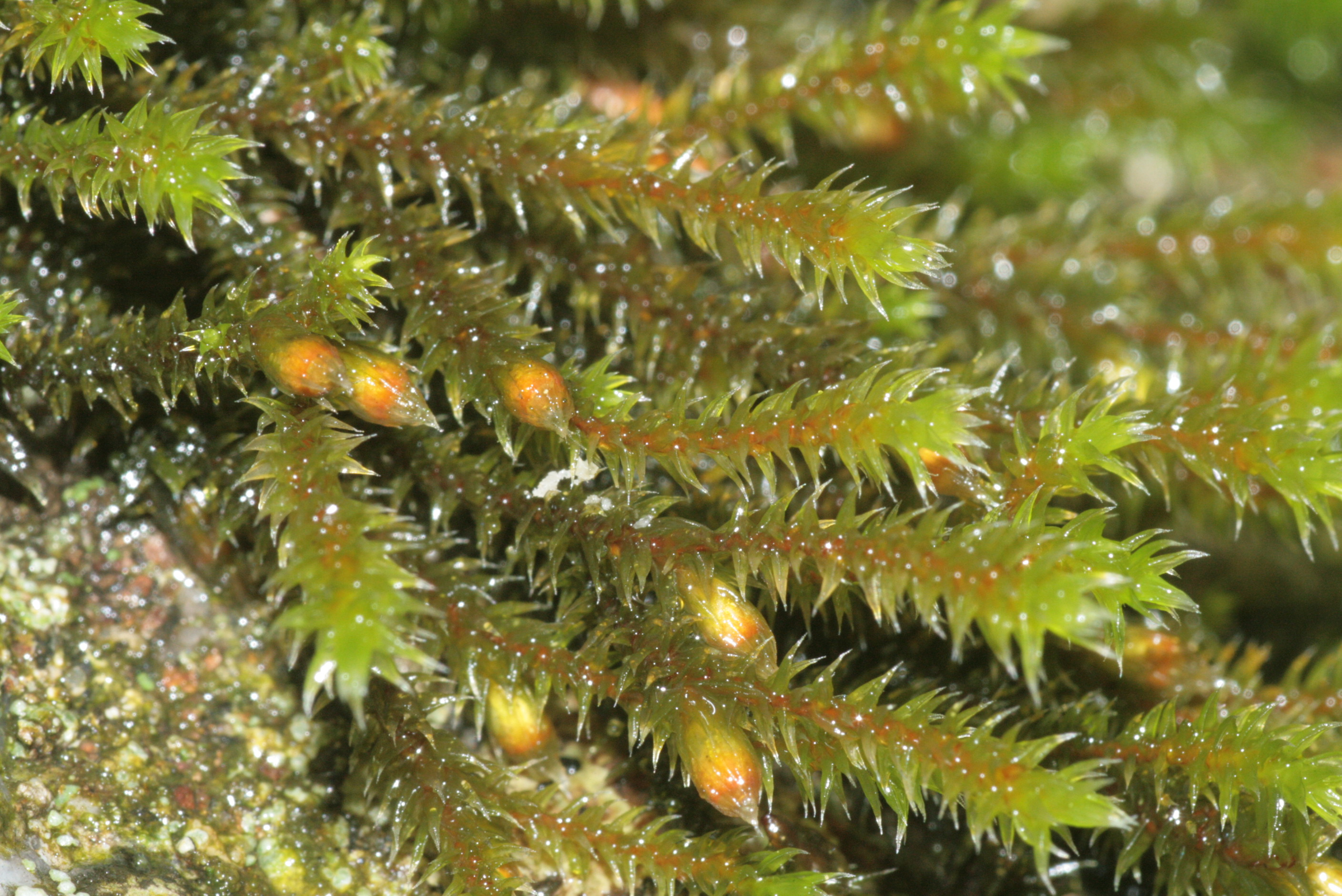
- Hedwigia ciliata

Scientific classification
- Kingdom: Plantae
- Division: Bryophyta
- Class: Bryopsida
- Subclass: Bryidae
- Order: Hedwigiales
- Family: Hedwigiaceae; Schimp.

= Hedwigiaceae =

Family of mosses

Hedwigiaceae is a family of mosses belonging to the order Hedwigiales. It is known as the hoar-moss family.

== Genera ==
- Braunia Bruch & Schimp.
- Hedwigia P. Beauv.
- Hedwigidium Bruch & Schimp.
- Pararhacocarpus J.-P. Frahm
- Pseudobraunia (Lesq. & James) Broth.
- Rhacocarpus Lindb.
