= Alan Crundwell =

British bryologist

Alan Cyril Crundwell (13 March 1923 – 20 August 2000) was a British bryologist, known for categorizing approximately 20 species of bryophytes, around six of which were previously unknown to science. He spent most of his professional life at the University of Glasgow, in Scotland.
