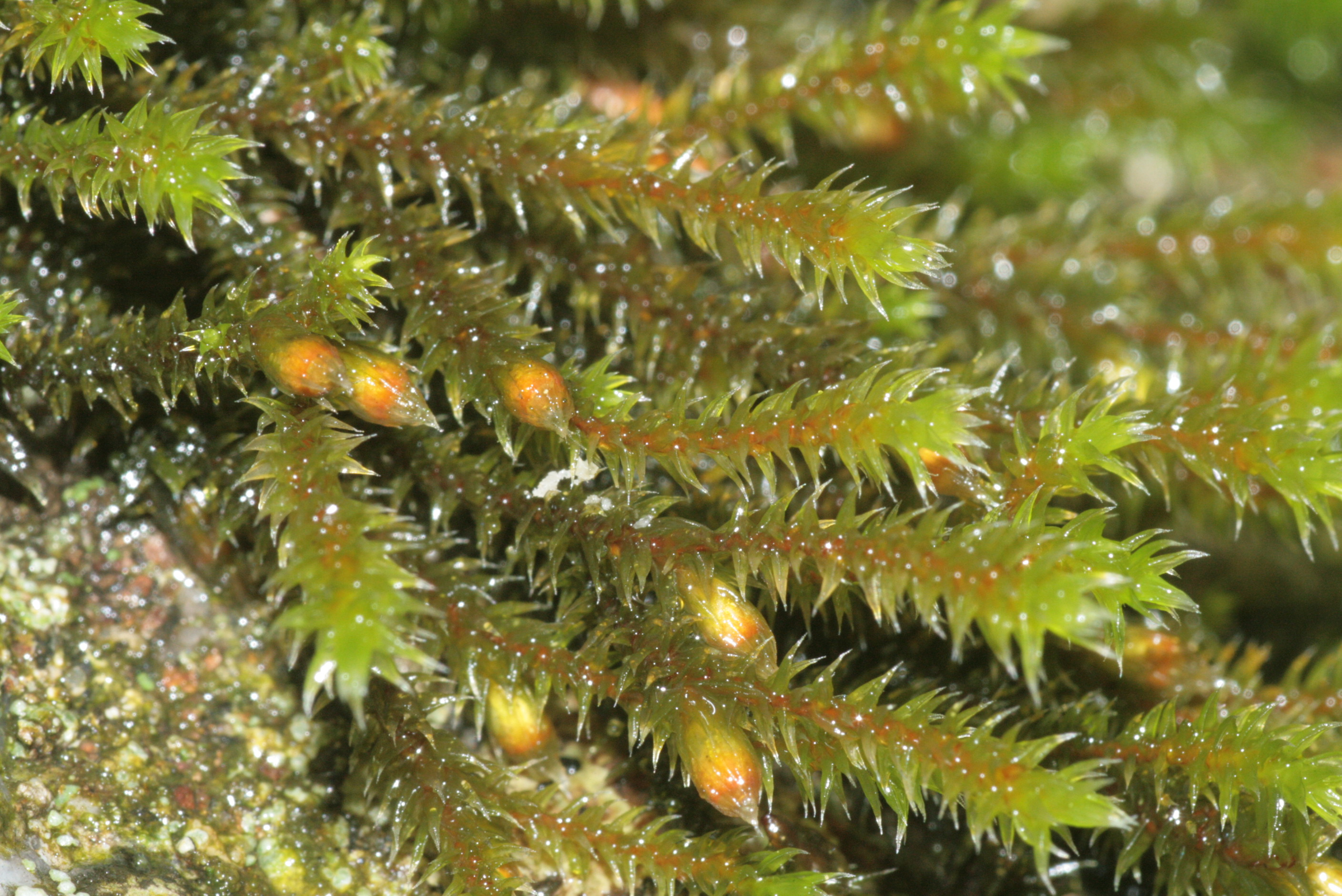
- Hedwigia ciliata

Scientific classification
- Kingdom: Plantae
- Division: Bryophyta
- Class: Bryopsida
- Subclass: Bryidae
- Superorder: Bryanae
- Order: Hedwigiales; Ochyra

Families
- See Classification

= Hedwigiales =

Order of mosses

Hedwigiales is an order of mosses. It is named after Johannes Hedwig (1730-1799), the founder of modern bryology.

== Description ==
They are medium to large size acrocarpous moss with irregular branching. A midrib is not normally present in the leaves.

== Classification ==
There are three families placed in the Hedwigiales.

- Hedwigiaceae
- Helicophyllaceae
- Rhacocarpaceae
