= Astomum =

Scientific classification
- Kingdom: Plantae
- Division: Bryophyta
- Class: Bryopsida
- Subclass: Dicranidae
- Order: Pottiales
- Family: Pottiaceae
- Genus: Astomum; Hampe

Genus of mosses

Astomum is a genus of mosses belonging to the family Pottiaceae.

The genus has almost cosmopolitan distribution.

== Species ==
GBIF lists four accepted species in the genus:

- Astomum cryptocarpum Broth.
- Astomum lorentzii (Müll.Hal.) Broth.
- Astomum mollifolium (Müll.Hal.) Broth.
- Astomum nicholsonii G. Roth.
