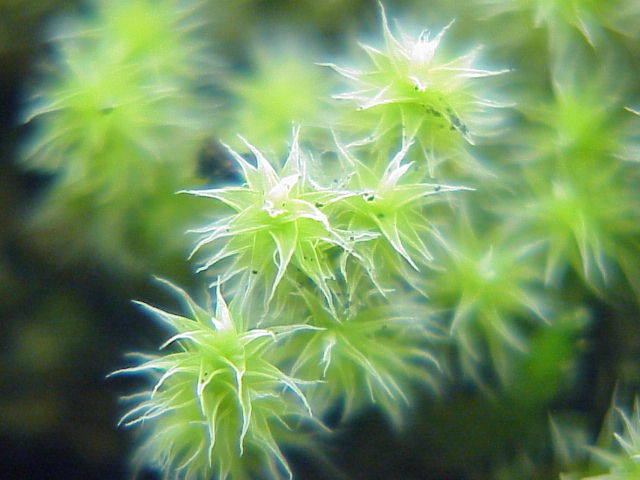

Scientific classification
- Kingdom: Plantae
- Division: Bryophyta
- Class: Bryopsida
- Subclass: Bryidae
- Order: Hedwigiales
- Family: Hedwigiaceae
- Genus: Hedwigia
- Species: H. ciliata

Binomial name
- Hedwigia ciliata (Hedw.) P. Beauv., 1804

= Hedwigia ciliata =

Species of moss

Hedwigia ciliata is a species of moss belonging to the family Hedwigiaceae.

It has cosmopolitan distribution.
