= Ilma Grace Stone =

Australian botanist (1913–2001)

- Born: Ilma Balfe; 11 June 1913; Brunswick, Australia
- Died: 4 January 2001 (aged 87)
- Education: University of Melbourne
- Known for: bryophyte morphology, taxonomy and field biology
- Spouse: Alan Stone
- Children: 3
- Scientific career
- Fields: Bryophytes
- Thesis: A morphogenetic study of stage in the life-cycle of some Victorial cryptograms (1963)

Ilma Grace Stone (1913 – 2001), née Balfe, was an Australian botanist who specialised in bryology. She was an author, collector, and researcher of Australian mosses, a subject on which she lectured and wrote.

== Scientific career ==
Stone studied at the Department of Botany in University of Melbourne from 1930 - 1934, graduating with an MSc involving a thesis on sclerotia-forming fungi that cause disease in ornamental plants. However, she did not begin her career studying bryophytes until 1957 when she was appointed as a demonstrator in the Department of Botany at University of Melbourne, at first part-time and then full-time. Her PhD was awarded in 1963 for A morphogenetic study of stage in the life-cycle of some Victorial cryptograms. She was awarded a D.Sc. by the University of Melbourne where she was an Honorary Research Fellow when she was 76. She officially retired from the university in 1978 but continued to research and publish until her death in 2001.

She was initially interested in ferns but from 1969 specialised in mosses. In 1983 she published a description of a new species, Fissidens gymnocarpus, and continued to contribute to moss taxonomy. She is noted for keen observation and attention to often small and overlooked moss species, and for her contributions to their taxonomy. She was also an impressive field bryologist. Stone is credited with significantly increasing knowledge of mosses in Australia, especially those in Queensland.

She was particularly expert in the genera Acaulon, Pleuridium, Eccremidium, Astomum and Nanobryum as well as the moss floras of Victoria and Queensland, the tropical mosses of Australia and those with permanent protonema. In addition, her work on the Australian Fissidens in collaboration with David Catcheside made significant improvements to its taxonomy.

== Publications ==
Stone published more than 70 papers during her career, the first when aged 48 and eleven after the age of 80.

- The Mosses of Southern Australia with George Anderson Macdonald Scott, published in 1976. Illustrations by Celia Rosser.

Over 70 research papers, including:

- Stone, IG. (1958) The gametophyte and embryo of Polyphlebium venosum (R.Br.) Copeland (Hymenophyllaceae). Aust. J. Bot. 6: 183–203.
- Stone, IG. (1961) The highly refractive protonema of Mittenia plumula (Mitt) Lindb. Proc. R. Soc. Vicr. 74: 119–124.
- Stone, IG. (1971) The sporophyte of Tortula pagorum (Milde) De Not. Trans. Brit. Bryol. Soc. 6: 270–277.
- Stone, IG. (1975) A remarkable new moss from Queensland, Australia. Viridivellus pulchellum, new genus and species (new family Viridivelleraceae). J. Bryology 9: 21–31.
- Stone. IG. (1979) Acaulon eremicola, a new moss from the Australian arid zone. J. Bryology 10: 467–474.
- Stone, IG. (1980) Phascopsis rubicunda, a new genus and species of Pottiaceae from Australia. J. Bryology 11: 17–31.
- Stone, IG. (1983) Fissidens gymnocarpus, a new species from Queensland, Australia. J. Bryology 12: 553–557.
- Stone, IG. (1988) Acaulon granulosum, a new species in the Acaulon muticum complex; a comparison and key to Australian species. J. Bryology. 15: 257–268.
- Catcheside, D.G. & Stone, IG. (1988) The mosses of the Northern Territory, Australia. J. Adelaide Bot. Gard. 11: 1–17.
- Stone, IG. (1989) A revision of Phascum and Acaulon in Australia. J. Bryology 15: 745–777.
- Stone, IG & Catcheside DG (1993) Two new species, Fissidens oblatus and F. badyinbarus, from Queensland, Australia. J. Bryology 17: 621–626.
- Stone, IG (1996) A revision of Ephemeraceae in Australia. Journal of Bryology 19: 279–295.
- Stone, IG (1997) A revision of Erpodiaceae with particular reference to Australian taxa. J. Bryology 19: 485–502.
- Beever JE & Stone IG (1999) Studies of Fissidens (Bryophyta: Musci): new taxa and new records for New Zealand. New Zealand Journal of Botany 37: 643–657.

She described 25 species, several genera and one new moss family.

Her collection of around 25,000 specimens were primarily held in the University of Melbourne Herbarium. However, they were consolidated in 2001 and are now held at the National Herbarium of Victoria, Royal Botanic Gardens Victoria. Stone's collection is particularly comprehensive for bryophytes of tropical areas of Australia.

== Awards and honours ==
In 1989 she was awarded a D.Sc. by the University of Melbourne where she was an Honorary Research Fellow.

She was elected an Honorary Member of the British Bryological Society in 1982.

Several species of moss have been named in her honour. This includes two genera (Stonea and Stoneobryum) and two species:

- Stonea oleaginosa (I.G. Stone) R.H. Zander Phytologia 65:432.
- Stoneobryum bunyaense D.H. Norris & H. Robinson Bryologist 84: 96.
- Stoneobryum mirum (Lewinsky) D.H. Norris & H. Robinson Bryologist 84: 98.
- Macromitrium stoneae Vitt & H.P. Ramsay J. Hattori Bot. Lab. 59: 400.
- Syrrhopodon stoneae W. Reese Bryologist 92: 302.

In 2023, as part of the new development of Macnamara, Australian Capital Territory, the suburb's landmarks were chosen to posthumously commemorate ten people associated with science and technology. This included naming one of the roads Ilma Stone Way.

== Early education and personal life ==
She was born in Brunswick, Victoria in Australia in 1913 and was educated at Ivanhoe Girls Grammar School, financed by a scholarship. She excelled in English and Botany. After gaining her MSc degree from University of Melbourne, rather than continue her studies at University of Cambridge in the UK, she chose to marry. She was married to Alan Stone and they had three children. For the first 20 years of her marriage her family took precedence over her career.
