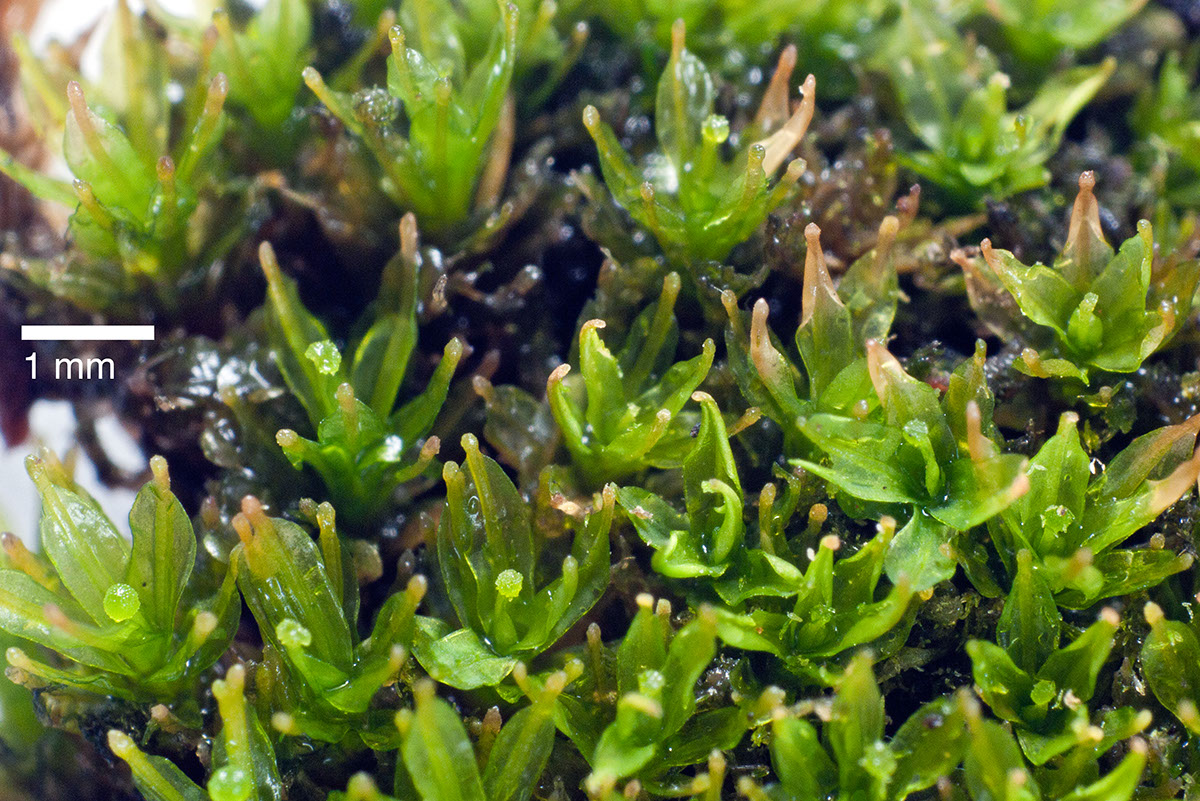
- Calymperes tenerum

Scientific classification
- Kingdom: Plantae
- Division: Bryophyta
- Class: Bryopsida
- Subclass: Dicranidae
- Order: Dicranales
- Family: Calymperaceae; Kindb.

Genera
- See text

= Calymperaceae =

Calymperaceae Temporal range: Cenomanian–Recent

Family of haplolepideous mosses

Calymperaceae is a family of haplolepideous mosses (Dicranidae) in the order Dicranales.

== Genera ==
The family Calymperaceae contains seven genera:

- Arthrocormus Dozy & Molk.
- Calymperes Sw.
- Exodictyon Cardot
- Exostratum L. T. Ellis
- Leucophanes Brid.
- Mitthyridium H. Rob.
- Syrrhopodon Schwägr.
- Calymperites Heinrhichs et al.. Burmese amber, Myanmar, Late Cretaceous (Cenomanian)
