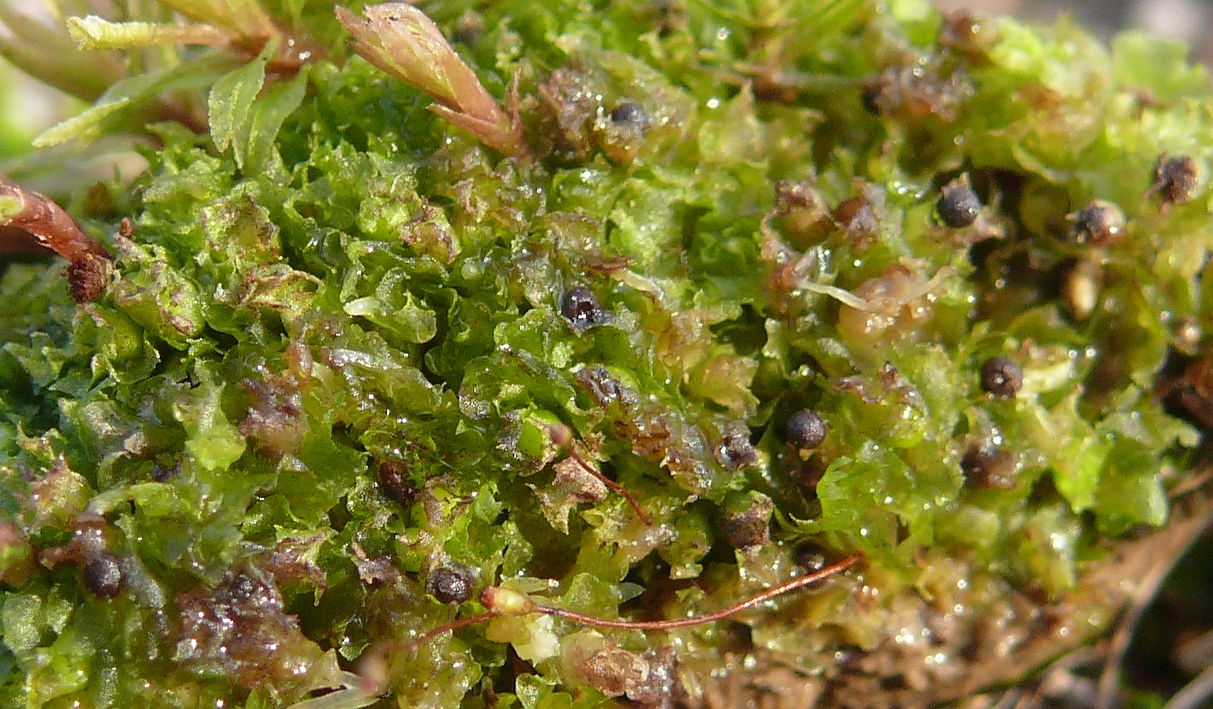
- Fossombronia sp.

Scientific classification
- Kingdom: Plantae
- Division: Marchantiophyta
- Class: Jungermanniopsida
- Order: Fossombroniales
- Family: Fossombroniaceae; Hazsl., 1885, nom. cons.

Genera
- Fossombronia

Synonyms
- Codoniaceae Klinggr., 1858

= Fossombroniaceae =

Family of liverworts

Fossombroniaceae (sometimes Codoniaceae) is a family of liverworts in the order Metzgeriales. Most species are small and thallose, but the thallus is typically ruffled to give the appearance of being leafy.

The family was long called the Codoniaceae, Klinggr. 1858, because this is the older name. But since the genus Codonia is a synonym of Fossombronia, the name Fossombroniaceae was proposed (and accepted) as a conserved name under the rules of the ICBN.
