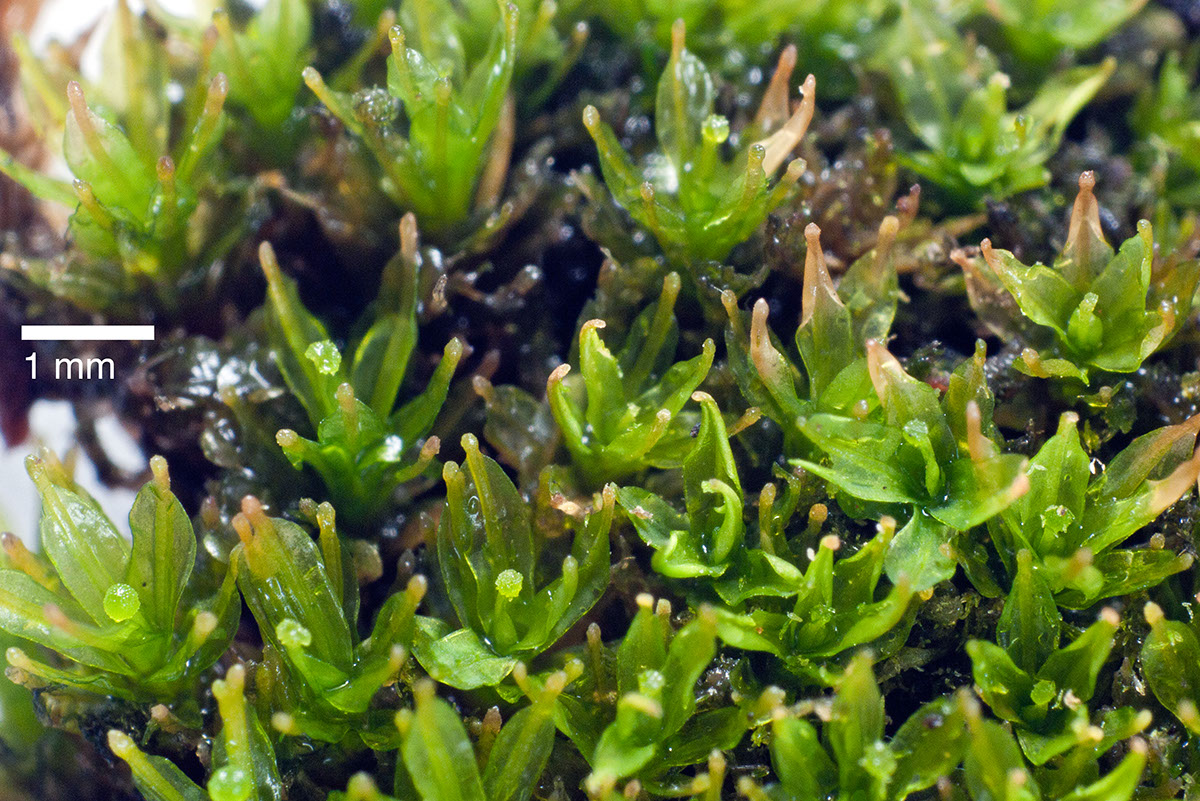
- Calymperes tenerum

Scientific classification
- Kingdom: Plantae
- Division: Bryophyta
- Class: Bryopsida
- Subclass: Dicranidae
- Order: Dicranales
- Family: Calymperaceae
- Genus: Calymperes; Sw. ex F.Weber

= Calymperes =

Genus of mosses

Calymperes is a genus of mosses belonging to the family Calymperaceae, for which it is the type genus.

== Species ==
Calymperes contains 48 species.

- Calymperes aeruginosum Hampe ex Sande Lac.
- Calymperes afzelii Sw.
- Calymperes bartramii W.D. Reese
- Calymperes beccarii Hampe
- Calymperes boninenseZ. Iwats.
- Calymperes boulayi Besch.
- Calymperes couguiense Besch.
- Calymperes crassinerve (Mitt.) A. Jaeger
- Calymperes erosum Müll.
- Calymperes fasciculatum Dozy & Molk.
- Calymperes flynnii L.T. Ellis
- Calymperes graeffeanum Müll. Hal.
- Calymperes guildingii Hook. & Grev.
- Calymperes guineense Paris & Broth.
- Calymperes hispidum Renauld & Cardot
- Calymperes levyanum Besch.
- Calymperes linearifolium Müll. Hal.
- Calymperes lonchophyllum Schwägr.
- Calymperes loucoubense Besch.
- Calymperes mangalorense Dixon & P. de la Varde
- Calymperes mitrafugax Florsch.
- Calymperes moluccense Schwägr.
- Calymperes motleyi Mitt. ex Dozy & Molk.
- Calymperes nanum Müll. Hal.
- Calymperes nicaraguense Renauld & Cardot
- Calymperes noakhalense Brühl & Sarkar
- Calymperes norkettii L.T. Ellis
- Calymperes othmeri Herzong
- Calymperes palisotii Schwägr
- Calymperes pallidum Mitt.
- Calymperes pintasi Müll.
- Calymperes platyloma Mitt.
- Calymperes porrectum Mitt.
- Calymperes pungens Müll. Hal.
- Calymperes robinsonii B.C. Tan & W.D. Reese
- Calymperes rubiginosum (Mitt.) W.D. Resse
- Calymperes schmidtii Broth.
- Calymperes serratioides L.T. Ellis
- Calymperes serratum A. Braun ex Müll. Hal.
- Calymperes smithii E.B. Bartram
- Calymperes strictifolium (Mitt.) G. Roth
- Calymperes subintegrum Broth.
- Calymperes subserratum M. Fleisch.
- Calymperes taitense (Sull.) Mitt.
- Calymperes tenerum Müll. Hal.
- Calymperes thomeanum Müll. Hal.
- Calymperes venezuelanum (Mitt.) Broth. ex Pittier
- Calymperes woodii L.T. Ellis
