= George Anderson Macdonald Scott =

Scottish-Australian polymath and bryologist

- George Anderson Macdonald Scott
- Born: 10 March 1933; Glasgow, Scotland.
- Died: March 23, 1998 (aged 65); New Zealand
- Education: Bachelor of Arts (Monash University), Bachelor of Science (University of Glasgow), Doctor of Philosophy (University College of North Wales), Doctor of Science (The University of Melbourne).
- Scientific career
- Fields: bryology, ecology, conservation, Greek and Latin
- Institutions: University of Otago, Monash University, University of Melbourne.

George Anderson Macdonald Scott (also known as G.A.M. Scott; 1933-1998) was a British polymath who specialised in bryology. He was a Fellow of the Linnean Society of London.

== Early life and education ==
Born on 10 March 1933 in Glasgow, after completing his secondary schooling in at the High School of Glasgow as the dux of his year, in October 1951, he started a degree in medicine at the University of Glasgow. However, he contracted tuberculosis and had to defer his studies for two years while recovering. After returning to university studies, he changed his focus to botany, graduating in a Bachelor of Science with first-class honours in 1957. In 1959, he undertook PhD studies at the University College of North Wales Bangor, on The biology of shingle beach plants with special reference to the ecology of selected species, graduating in 1961.

== Career ==
In 1961, he moved to the University of Otago, in Dunedin, New Zealand to take up a position as assistant lecturer in botany, with promotions to lecturer and senior lecturer. In 1970, Scott moved across the Tasman Sea to Monash University in Melbourne, Australia, to take up a senior research fellowship.

He taught and supervised students in the fields of ecology and bryology, ultimately being appointed senior lecturer (1973–83) and then reader (1984–86) in botany at Monash. It is also during this time that he undertook a Bachelor of Arts degree in classics, graduating and winning the Latin poetry prize in 1985. He was also appointed to the bryophyte committee of the International Association for Plant Taxonomy in 1978, and served as a council member of the International Association of Bryologists from 1981-83.

In 1986, he was appointed Master of Queen's College, Melbourne, the same year that Scott was elected a fellow of the Linnean Society of London. A strong supporter of plant conservation, he served (1988–97) on the Victorian government’s Scientific Advisory Committee, providing advice on threatened species and ecological communities.

=== Botanical legacy ===
His name has been memorialised in two moss species, Frullania scottiana and Bazzania gamscottii. Specimens collected by Scott are now held in herbaria in Australia and New Zealand, including the Otago Regional Herbarium, the University of Melbourne Herbarium, and the National Herbarium of Victoria, Royal Botanic Gardens Victoria.

== Major publications ==
- Scott, G.A.M. and Stone, I.G. 1976. The mosses of southern Australia (London, New York: Academic Press), with illustrations by Celia Rosser.
- Scott, G.A.M. 1985. Southern Australian liverworts. (Canberra: Australian Government Publishing Service), with illustrations by Bruce Fuhrer and Rod Seppelt.
- Cropper, S.C., Tonkinson, D.A. & Scott, G.A.M. 1991. A census of Victorian Bryophytes. (East Melbourne: Dept. of Conservation and Environment, Victoria).
- Scott, G.A.M. 1994. 'Liverworts and mosses.' In Entwistle, T.J. (Ed.) Aquatic Cryptogams of Australia: A Guide to the Larger Fungi, Lichens, Macroalgae, Liverworts and Mosses of Australian Inland Waters. (Abbotsford: Australian Society for Limnology): 106-142.
- Scott, G.A.M., Entwisle, T.J., May, T.W., Stevens, G.N. Eds. 1997. A conservation overview of Australian non-marine lichens, bryophytes, algae and fungi. (Canberra: Environment Australia)

=== Classics and bryology ===
While on sabbaticals undertaking a research fellowship at Corpus Christi College, Cambridge, Scott also produced three papers combining his passion for Classics and bryology:

- Scott, G.A.M. (1987). Aristotle's Mosses. Memoirs of the New York Botanical Garden. 45: 46-47.
- Scott, G.A.M. (1987). Studies in Ancient Bryology, I. Introduction and Liverworts to 1500 A.D. Journal of Bryology, 14(4), 625–634. https://doi.org/10.1179/jbr.1987.14.4.625
- Scott, G.A.M. (1988). Studies in Ancient Bryology, II. Mosses to 1500 A.D. Journal of Bryology, 15(1), 1–15. https://doi.org/10.1179/jbr.1988.15.1.1
