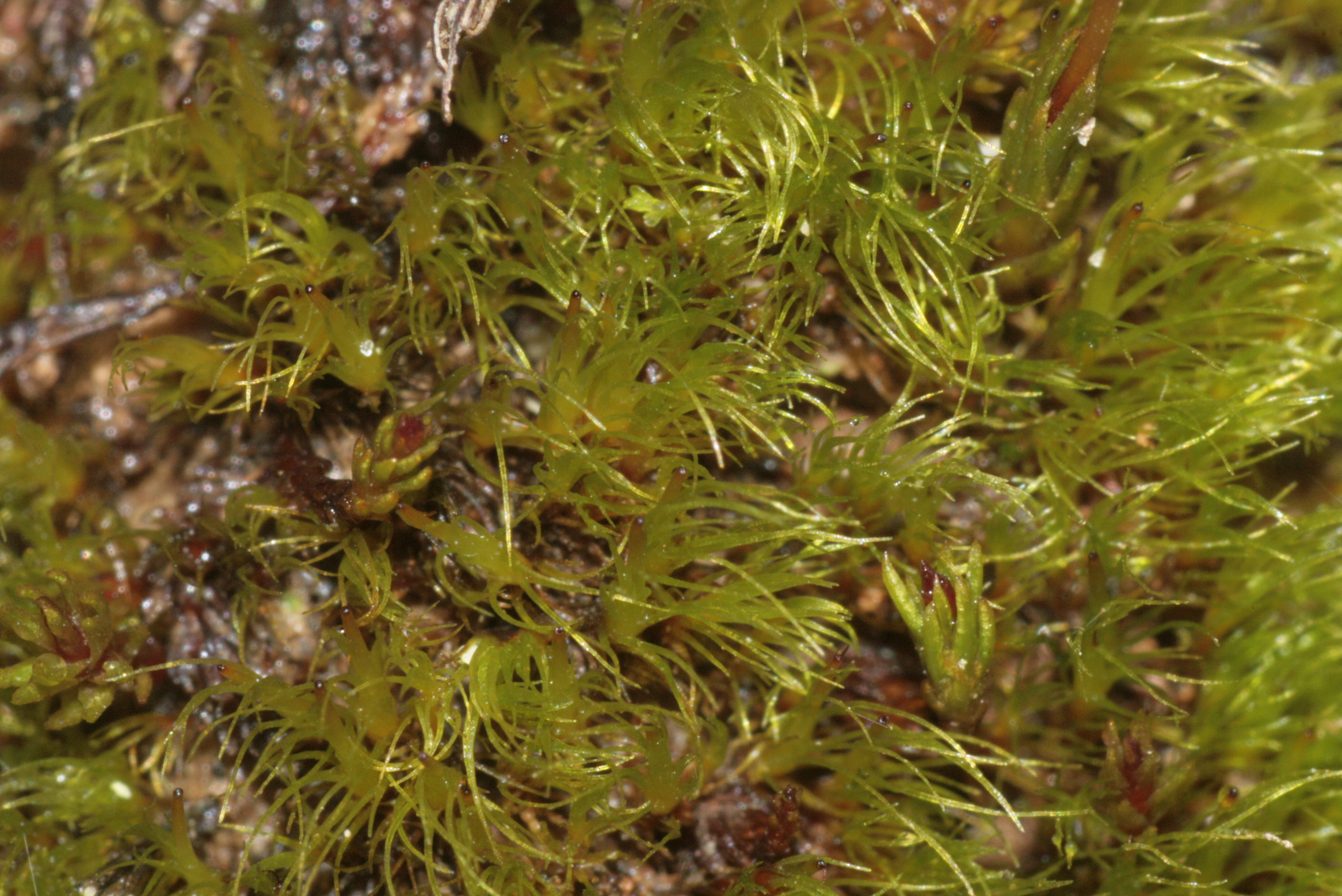
- Ditrichum heteromallum

Scientific classification
- Kingdom: Plantae
- Clade: Embryophytes
- Division: Bryophyta
- Class: Bryopsida
- Subclass: Dicranidae
- Order: Ditrichales
- Family: Ditrichaceae; Limpr.

Genera
- See text

= Ditrichaceae =

Family of haplolepideous mosses

Ditrichaceae is a family of haplolepideous mosses in subclass Dicranidae. The family was previously placed in order Dicranales, but it now placed in its own monotypic order, Ditrichales.

== Genera ==
The family Ditrichaceae contains over twenty genera:

- Astomiopsis Müll. Hal.
- Bryomanginia Thér.
- Ceratodon Brid.
- Cheilothela Broth.
- Cladastomum Müll. Hal.
- Cleistocarpidium Ochyra & Bednarek-Ochyra
- Crumuscus W. R. Buck & Snider
- Cygniella H. A. Crum
- Ditrichopsis Broth.
- Ditrichum Hampe
- Eccremidium Hook.f. & Wilson
- Garckea Müll. Hal.
- Kleioweisiopsis Dixon
- ×Pleuriditrichum A. L. Andrews & F. J. Herm.
- Pleuridium Rabenh.
- Rhamphidium Mitt.
- Skottsbergia Cardot
- Strombulidens W. R. Buck
- Trichodon Schimp.
- Tristichium Müll. Hal.
- Wilsoniella Müll. Hal.
