= Samuel Elisée Bridel-Brideri =

- Born: 28 November 1761
- Died: 7 January 1828 (aged 66)
- Education: University of Lausanne
- Scientific career
- Fields: Bryology
- Author abbrev. (botany): Brid.

Samuel Elisée Bridel-Brideri (28 November 1761 in Crassier, Vaud – 7 January 1828) was a Swiss-German bryologist.

He studied at the University of Lausanne, and at the age of 19 began work as a tutor to the princes of Saxe-Gotha-Altenburg. In 1804, he was appointed Geheimer Legationsrath to the Privy Council, and later on, he worked as a librarian in the city of Gotha.

He was the author of an important work on mosses titled Muscologia recentiorum (1797–1803), of which several supplements were issued in the ensuing years. Later on, he published the two-volume Bryologia universa (1826–27), which was an improved edition of his earlier work. In the latter work he introduced a new system for the classification of mosses; a system that is no longer used.

The genus Bridelia was named in his honor by German botanist Carl Ludwig Willdenow (1765–1812). A portion of his herbarium is now housed at the Berlin Botanical Museum, and a number of his scientific papers are kept at the Forschungsbibliothek Gotha, Schloss Friedenstein in Gotha. Also, he was the author of Délassements poétiques, a well-received book of poetry.
