= List of plant orders by name =

This is an alphabetically sorted list of living Viridiplantae orders.

This list, similarly to the more taxonomical version, is based primarily on the work of Ruggiero et al. 2015. Living orders of lycophytes and ferns are taken from Christenhusz et al. 2011b and Pteridophyte Phylogeny Group, living orders of gymnosperms are added from Christenhusz et al. 2011a, and extinct orders are from Anderson, Anderson & Cleal 2007.

For the version sorted by taxonomic relation, see List of plant orders.

== A ==
- †Aberiales
- Acorales
- Alismatales
- Amborellales
- Ambuchananiales
- †Anachoropteridales
- Andreaeales
- Andreaeobryales
- †Aneurophytales
- Anthocerotales
- Apiales
- Aquifoliales
- Araucariales
- †Archaefructales
- †Archaeopteridales
- Archidiales
- Arecales
- Asparagales
- Asterales
- †Asteroxylales
- Aulacomniales
- Austrobaileyales
- †Axelrodiales

== B ==
- †Barinophytales
- Bartramiales
- Berberidopsidales
- †Bernettiales
- Blasiales
- Boraginales
- †Botryopteridiales
- Brassicales
- Bruniales
- Bryales
- Bryopsidales
- Bryoxiphiales
- †Buriadiales
- Buxales
- Buxbaumiales

== C ==
- †Calamopityales
- †Callistophytales
- Calobryales
- Canellales
- Caryophyllales
- Catoscopiales
- †Caytoniales
- †Cecropsidales
- Celastrales
- Ceratophyllales
- Chaetopeltidales
- Chaetophorales
- Charales
- Chlamydomonadales
- Chloranthales
- Chlorellales
- Chlorococcales
- Chlorodendrales
- Chlorokybales
- Chloropicales
- †Chovanellales
- Cladophorales
- †Cladoxylales
- †Codonospermales
- Coleochaetales
- Commelinales
- †Cooksoniales
- †Cordaitales
- Cornales
- Crossosomatales
- Cucurbitales
- Cupressales
- Cyatheales
- Cycadales
- †Cycadeoideales
- †Czekanowskiales

== D ==
- Dasycladales
- Dendrocerotales
- Desmidiales
- Dicranales
- †Dicranophyllales
- †Dictyopteridiales
- Dilleniales
- Dioscoreales
- Diphysciales
- Dipsacales
- Disceliales
- †Discinitiales
- Dolichomastigales
- †Dordrechtitales
- †Drepanophycales

== E ==
- Encalyptales
- †Eoanthales
- †Eophyllophytales
- Equisetales
- †Erdtmanithecales
- Ericales
- Escalloniales

== F ==
- Fabales
- Fagales
- †Ferugliocladales
- Fossombroniales
- †Fraxinopsiales
- †Fredlindiales
- Funariales

== G ==
- Garryales
- Gentianales
- Geraniales
- †Gigantopteridales
- Gigaspermales
- Ginkgoales
- Gleicheniales
- Gnetales
- Grimmiales
- Gunnerales

== H ==
- †Hamshawviales
- Hedwigiales
- †Hexapterospermales
- †Hlatimbiales
- Hookeriales
- †Horneophytales
- Huerteales
- †Hyeniales
- Hymenophyllales
- Hypnales
- Hypnodendrales
- Hypopterygiales

== I ==
- †Ibykales
- Icacinales
- Ignatiales
- †Iridopteridales
- Isoetales

== J ==
- Jungermanniales

== K ==
- Klebsormidiales

== L ==
- Lamiales
- Laurales
- Leiosporocerotales
- †Lepidodendrales
- †Lidgettoniales
- Liliales
- Lunulariales
- Lycopodiales
- †Lyginopteridales

== M ==
- Magnoliales
- Malpighiales
- Malvales
- Mamiellales
- Marattiales
- Marchantiales
- Marsupiomonadales
- †Matatiellales
- Mesostigmatales
- Mesotaeniales
- Metteniusales
- Metzgeriales
- Microsporales
- Microthamniales
- Moellerinales
- Monomastigales
- †Moresnetiales
- Myrtales

== N ==
- Neohodgsoniales
- Nephroselmidales
- †Noeggerathiales
- ?†Noeggerathiopsidales
- Notothyladales
- Nymphaeales

== O ==
- Oedipodiales
- Oedogoniales
- Oltmannsiellopsidales
- Ophioglossales
- Orthodontiales
- Orthotrichales
- Osmundales
- Oxalidales

== P ==
- †Pachytestales
- Pallaviciniales
- Palmophyllales
- Pandanales
- Paracryphiales
- Pedinomonadales
- Pelliales
- †Peltaspermales
- †Pentoxylales
- †Petriellales
- Petrosaviales
- †Phasmatocycadales
- ?Phyllosiphonales
- Phymatocerotales
- Picocystales
- Picramniales
- Pinales
- Piperales
- †Pityales
- †Pleuromeiales
- Pleuroziales
- Poales
- †Podozamitales
- Polypodiales
- Polytrichales
- Porellales
- Pottiales
- Prasinococcales
- Prasinodermatales
- Prasiolales
- Proteales
- †Protolepidodendrales
- †Protopityales
- †Protosphagnales
- †Pseudoborniales
- Pseudoditrichales
- ?Pseudoscourfieldiales
- †Pseudosporochnales
- Psilotales
- Ptilidiales
- Ptychomniales
- †Pullarithecales
- Pyramimonadales

== R ==
- Ranunculales
- †Rhacophytales
- Rhizogoniales
- †Rhyniales
- †Rigbyales
- Rosales

== S ==
- Salviniales
- Santalales
- Sapindales
- ?†Sarbaicarpales
- †Sawdoniales
- Saxifragales
- Schizaeales
- Scotinosphaerales
- †Scougonophytales
- Scouleriales
- ?Scourfieldiales
- Selaginellales
- †Senftenbergiales
- Solanales
- Sphaerocarpales
- Sphaeropleales
- Sphagnales
- †Sphenophyllales
- Spirogloeales
- Splachnales
- †Sporophyllitales
- †Stauropteridales
- †Steloxylales
- †Stenokoleales
- †Sycidiales

== T ==
- ?†Taeniocradales
- Takakiales
- Tetraphidales
- Tetrasporales
- †Tetrastichiales
- ?†Thursophytales
- Timmiales
- †Tingiales
- Trebouxiales
- Trentepohliales
- Treubiales
- †Trichopityales
- †Trimerophytales
- Trochodendrales

== U ==
- †Ullmanniales
- Ulotrichales
- Ulvales
- †Umkomasiales
- †Urnatopteridales

== V ==
- Vahliales
- Vitales
- †Vladimariales
- †Vojnovskyales
- †Voltziales

== W ==
- †Walchiales

== Y ==
- ?†Yarraviales

== Z ==
- Zingiberales
- †Zosterophyllales
- Zygnematales
- Zygophyllales
- †Zygopteridales

== See also ==
- List of plant orders
