= List of plant orders =

This article lists the living orders of the Viridiplantae, based primarily on the work of Ruggiero et al. 2015.

Living orders of Lycophytes and ferns are taken from Christenhusz et al. 2011b and Pteridophyte Phylogeny Group. Living orders of Gymnosperms are added from Christenhusz et al. 2011a while extinct orders are from Anderson, Anderson & Cleal 2007.

For the version sorted in alphabetical order, see List of plant orders by name.

== Division Prasinodermophyta ==
=== Class Prasinodermophyceae ===
- Order Prasinodermatales

=== Class Palmophyllophyceae ===
- Order Prasinococcales
- Order Palmophyllales

== Division Chlorophyta ==
=== Subdivision Prasinophytina ===
==== Class Mamiellophyceae ====
- Order Monomastigales
- Order Dolichomastigales
- Order Mamiellales

==== Class Pyramimonadophyceae ====
- Order Pyramimonadales

=== Subdivision Chlorophytina ===
==== Class Nephroselmidophyceae ====
- Order Nephroselmidales

==== Class Picocystophyceae ====
- Order Picocystales
- Order ?Pseudoscourfieldiales

==== Class Chloropicophyceae ====
- Order Chloropicales

==== Class Pedinophyceae ====
- Order ?Scourfieldiales
- Order Marsupiomonadales
- Order Pedinomonadales

==== Class Chlorodendrophyceae ====
- Order Chlorodendrales

==== Class Trebouxiophyceae ====
- Order ?Phyllosiphonales
- Order Chlorellales
- Order Prasiolales
- Order Microthamniales
- Order Trebouxiales

==== Class Ulvophyceae ====
- Order Ignatiales
- Order Oltmannsiellopsidales
- Order Scotinosphaerales
- Order Ulotrichales
- Order Ulvales
- Order Trentepohliales
- Order Cladophorales
- Order Dasycladales
- Order Bryopsidales

==== Class Chlorophyceae ====
- Order Chaetopeltidales
- Order Chaetophorales
- Order Chlamydomonadales
- Order Chlorococcales
- Order Microsporales
- Order Oedogoniales
- Order Sphaeropleales
- Order Tetrasporales

== Division Streptophyta ==
=== Subdivision Chlorokybophytina ===
==== Class Mesostigmatophyceae ====
- Order Mesostigmatales

==== Class Chlorokybophyceae ====
- Order Chlorokybales

=== Subdivision Klebsormidiophyinta ===
==== Class Klebsormidiophyceae ====
- Order Klebsormidiales

=== Subdivision Charophytina ===
==== Class Charophyceae ====
- Order †Sycidiales
- Order †Chovanellales
- Order †Moellerinales
- Order Charales (Stoenworts & musk grasses)

=== Subdivision Coleochaetophytina ===
==== Class Coleochaetophyceae ====
- Order Coleochaetales

=== Subdivision Zygnematophytina ===
==== Class Zygnematophyceae ====
- Order Spirogloeales
- Order Zygnematales
- Order Mesotaeniales
- Order Desmidiales

=== Subdivision Anthocerotophytina ===
==== Class Leiosporocerotopsida ====
- Order Leiosporocerotales

==== Class Anthocerotopsida ====
- Order Anthocerotales
- Order Notothyladales
- Order Phymatocerotales
- Order Dendrocerotales

=== Subdivision Marchantiophytina ===
==== Class Haplomitriopsida ====
- Order Treubiales
- Order Calobryales

==== Class Marchantiopsida ====
- Subclass Blasiidae
  - Order Blasiales
- Subclass Marchantiidae (Complex thalloid liverworts)
  - Order Neohodgsoniales
  - Order Sphaerocarpales
  - Order Lunulariales (crescent-cup liverwort)
  - Order Marchantiales

==== Class Jungermanniopsida ====
- Subclass Pelliidae
  - Order Pelliales
  - Order Pallaviciniales
  - Order Fossombroniales
- Subclass Metzgeriidae
  - Order Pleuroziales
  - Order Metzgeriales
- Subclass Jungermanniidae (leafy liverworts)
  - Order Porellales
  - Order Ptilidiales
  - Order Jungermanniales

=== Subdivision Bryophytina ===
==== Class Takakiopsida ====
- Order Takakiales

==== Class Sphagnopsida ====
- Order †Protosphagnales
- Order Ambuchananiales
- Order Sphagnales (Peat/bog mosses)

==== Class Andreaeobryopsida ====
- Order Andreaeobryales

==== Class Andreaeopsida ====
- Order Andreaeales (Granite/lantern mosses)

==== Class Oedipodiopsida ====
- Order Oedipodiales

==== Class Tetraphidopsida ====
- Order Tetraphidales

==== Class Polytrichopsida ====
- Order Polytrichales (Hair-cap mosses)

==== Class Bryopsida ====
- Subclass Buxbaumiidae
  - Order Buxbaumiales
- Subclass Diphysciidae
  - Order Diphysciales
- Subclass Gigaspermidae
  - Order Gigaspermales
- Subclass Funariidae
  - Order Disceliales
  - Order Encalyptales
  - Order Funariales
- Subclass Timmiidae
  - Order Timmiales
- Subclass Dicranidae (Haplolepideous mosses)
  - Order Archidiales
  - Order Pseudoditrichales
  - Order Catoscopiales
  - Order Scouleriales
  - Order Bryoxiphiales
  - Order Grimmiales
  - Order Pottiales
  - Order Dicranales
- Subclass Bryidae (Diplolepideous-alternate mosses)
  - Superorder Bryanae
    - Order Splachnales
    - Order Hedwigiales
    - Order Bartramiales
    - Order Bryales
    - Order Rhizogoniales
    - Order Orthotrichales
    - Order Orthodontiales
    - Order Aulacomniales
  - Superorder Hypnanae
    - Order Hypnodendrales
    - Order Ptychomniales
    - Order Hypopterygiales
    - Order Hookeriales
    - Order Hypnales

=== Clade †Horneophytina ===
==== Class †Horneophytopsida ====
- Order †Horneophytales

=== Subdivision Tracheophytina ===
==== Class †Cooksoniopsida ====
- Order †Cooksoniales

==== Class †Rhyniopsida ====
- Order ?†Yarraviales
- Order ?†Taeniocradales
- Order †Rhyniales

==== Clade †Zosterophyllophyta ====
- Class †Barinophytopsida
  - Order †Barinophytales
- Class †Zosterophyllopsida
  - Order †Sawdoniales
  - Order †Zosterophyllales

==== Class Lycopodiopsida ====
- Order †Drepanophycales
- Subclass †Asteroxylidae
  - Order ?†Thursophytales
  - Order †Asteroxylales
- Subclass Lycopodiidae
  - Order Lycopodiales (Clubmosses, groundpines, groundcedars)
- Subclass †Prolepidodendridae
  - Order †Protolepidodendrales
- Subclass Selaginellidae (Spikemosses; rose of Jericho; resurrection plant; Engels moss)
  - Order Selaginellales
  - Order †Lepidodendrales
  - Order †Pleuromeiales
  - Order Isoetales (Quillworts)

==== Class †Eophyllophytopsida ====
- Order †Eophyllophytales

==== Class †Trimerophytopsida ====
- Order †Trimerophytales

==== Clade Pteridophyta ====
- Order †Ibykales
- Class †Cladoxylopsida
  - Order †Hyeniales
  - Order †Iridopteridales
  - Order †Steloxylales
  - Order †Pseudosporochnales
  - Order †Cladoxylales
- Class Polypodiopsida (Ferns)
  - Order †Stauropteridales
  - Subclass †Zygopterididae
    - Order †Rhacophytales
    - Order †Zygopteridales
  - Subclass Equisetidae
    - Order †Pseudoborniales
    - Order †Sphenophyllales
    - Order Equisetales (Horsetails; scouring-rushes)
  - Subclass Ophioglossidae
    - Order Psilotales (Whisk ferns)
    - Order Ophioglossales (Adder's tongues, moonworts)
  - Subclass Marattiopsida
    - Order Marattiales
  - Subclass Polypodiidae
    - Order †Urnatopteridales
    - Order †Senftenbergiales
    - Order †Botryopteridiales
    - Order †Anachoropteridales
    - Order Osmundales (Royal ferns)
    - Order Hymenophyllales (Filmy ferns)
    - Order Gleicheniales
    - Order Schizaeales
    - Order Salviniales
    - Order Cyatheales
    - Order Polypodiales (Cathetogyrates)

==== Class †Noeggerathiopsida ====
- Order †Discinitiales
- Order †Noeggerathiales
- Order †Tingiales

==== Class †Aneurophytopsida ====
- Order †Scougonophytales
- Order †Aneurophytales

==== Class †Archaeopteridopsida ====
- Order †Cecropsidales
- Order †Archaeopteridales

==== Incertae sedis ====
- Order †Protopityales
- Order †Stenokoleales

==== Clade Spermatophyta ====
- Order †Calamopityales
- Order †Callistophytales
- Order †Erdtmanithecales
- Order †Hlatimbiales
- Order †Umkomasiales
- Class †Arberiopsida
  - Order †Aberiales
  - Order †Dicranophyllales
- Class †Moresnetiopsida
  - Order †Moresnetiales
  - Order †Pullarithecales
  - Order †Tetrastichiales
- Class †Lyginopteridopsida
  - Order †Hexapterospermales
  - Order †Lyginopteridales
- Class †Pachytestopsida
  - Order †Codonospermales
  - Order †Pachytestales
- Class †Peltaspermopsida
  - Order †Peltaspermales
  - Order †Sporophyllitales
  - Order †Trichopityales
- Class †Phasmatocycadopsida
  - Order †Gigantopteridales
  - Order †Phasmatocycadales
- Class †Pentoxylopsida
  - Order †Pentoxylales
- Class †Dictyopteridiopsida
  - Order †Dictyopteridiales
  - Order †Lidgettoniales
  - Order †Rigbyales
- Class †Cycadeoideopsida
  - Order †Fredlindiales
  - Order †Cycadeoideales
- Class †Caytoniopsida
  - Order †Caytoniales
- Class †Axelrodiopsida
  - Order †Axelrodiales
- Class Pinopsida
  - †Subclass Pityidae
    - †Order Pityales
  - Subclass Cycadidae
    - Order ?†Noeggerathiopsidales
    - Order †Podozamitales
    - Order Cycadales (Cycads)
  - Subclass Ginkgoidae
    - Order †Hamshawviales
    - Order †Vladimariales
    - Order †Matatiellales
    - Order †Petriellales
    - Order †Czekanowskiales
    - Order Ginkgoales
  - Subclass Pinidae
    - Order †Cordaitales
    - Order †Dordrechtitales
    - Order †Vojnovskyales
    - Order †Buriadiales
    - Order †Ferugliocladales
    - Order †Ullmanniales
    - Order †Walchiales
    - Order †Voltziales
    - Order †Bernettiales
    - Order †Eoanthales
    - Order †Fraxinopsiales
    - Order Gnetales (incl. Ephedrales & Welwitschiales)
    - Order Pinales (Pines and allies)
    - Order Araucariales
    - Order Cupressales (Cypresses and allies)
- Class Magnoliopsida
  - Subclass †Archaemagnoliidae
    - Order †Archaefructales
  - Superorder Amborellanae
    - Order Amborellales
  - Subclass Nymphaeidae
    - Order Nymphaeales
  - Subclass Illiciidae
    - Order Austrobaileyales
  - Subclass Chloranthidae
    - Order Chloranthales
  - Subclass Magnoliidae
    - Order Canellales
    - Order Piperales
    - Order Laurales
    - Order Magnoliales
  - Subclass Liliidae
    - Superorder Acoranae
      - Order Acorales
    - Superorder Alismatanae
      - Order Alismatales
    - Superorder Petrosavianae
      - Order Petrosaviales
    - Superorder Pandananae
      - Order Dioscoreales
      - Order Pandanales
    - Superorder Lilianae
      - Order Liliales
    - Superorder Orchidanae
      - Order Asparagales
    - Superorder Commelinids
        - Order Arecales
        - Order Commelinales
        - Order Zingiberales
        - Order Poales
  - Subclass Ceratophyllidae
    - Order Ceratophyllales
  - Clade Eudicots
    - Order ?†Sarbaicarpales
    - Subclass Ranunculidae
      - Order Ranunculales
    - Subclass Nelumbonidae
      - Order Proteales
    - Subclass Trochodendridae
      - Order Trochodendrales
    - Superorder Buxanae
      - Order Buxales
    - Superorder Myrothamnanae
      - Order Gunnerales
    - Clade Pentapetalae
      - Subclass Dilleniidae
        - Order Dilleniales
      - 'Subclass Asteridae
        - Superorder Berberidopsidanae
          - Order Berberidopsidales
        - Superorder Santalanae
          - Order Santalales
        - Superorder Caryophyllanae
          - Order Caryophyllales
        - Superorder Cornanae
          - Order Cornales
        - Superorder Ericanae
          - Order Ericales
        - Superorder Asteranae
          - Order Apiales
          - Order Aquifoliales
          - Order Asterales
          - Order Bruniales
          - Order Dipsacales
          - Order Escalloniales
          - Order Paracryphiales
        - Superorder Lamianae
          - Order Boraginales
          - Order Garryales
          - Order Gentianales
          - Order Icacinales
          - Order Lamiales
          - Order Metteniusales
          - Order Solanales
          - Order Vahliales
      - Subclass Rosidae
        - Superorder Saxifraganae
          - Order Saxifragales
        - Superorder Vitanae
          - Order Vitales
        - Superorder Rosanae
          - Order Zygophyllales
          - Order Celastrales
          - Order Malpighiales
          - Order Oxalidales
          - Order Fabales
          - Order Cucurbitales
          - Order Fagales
          - Order Rosales
        - Superorder Myrtanae
          - Order Geraniales
          - Order Myrtales
          - Order Crossosomatales
          - Order Picramniales
          - Order Sapindales
          - Order Huerteales
          - Order Malvales
          - Order Brassicales
