= Tetraselmis chui =

Scientific classification
- Domain: Eukaryota
- Supergroup: Archaeplastida
- Clade: Viridiplantae
- Division: Chlorophyta
- Class: Chlorodendrophyceae
- Order: Chlorodendrales
- Family: Chlorodendraceae
- Genus: Tetraselmis
- Species: T. chui

Binomial name
- Tetraselmis chui Butcher, 1959

Species of alga

Tetraselmis chui is a unicellular green alga in the family Chlorodendraceae. It is found in marine environments and has been reported on the coasts of Great Britain and the Pacific Northwest.

T. chui was first described in 1959 by Robert William Butcher. The specific epithet is named for S. P. Chu.

Like other members of Tetraselmis, T. chui is known for its high fatty acid content, particularly polyunsaturated fatty acids (PUFAs). T. chui strain CCAP 8/6 is used in aquaculture industry. It is also approved by both the United States Food and Drug Administration and the European Food Safety Authority as a novel food and the dried biomass is sold under the name TetraSOD.
