= Buxbaumia (journal) =

- Discipline: Bryology
- Language: English

Publication details
- History: 1947–1970

Standard abbreviations
- ISO 4: Buxbaumia

Indexing
- OCLC no.: 243889284

Buxbaumia was a bryological journal published in the Netherlands, beginning in 1947. It was named for the moss genus Buxbaumia. In 1970, the journal became Lindbergia and Buxbaumiella.
