= Joachim Christian Timm =

German botanist (1734–1805)

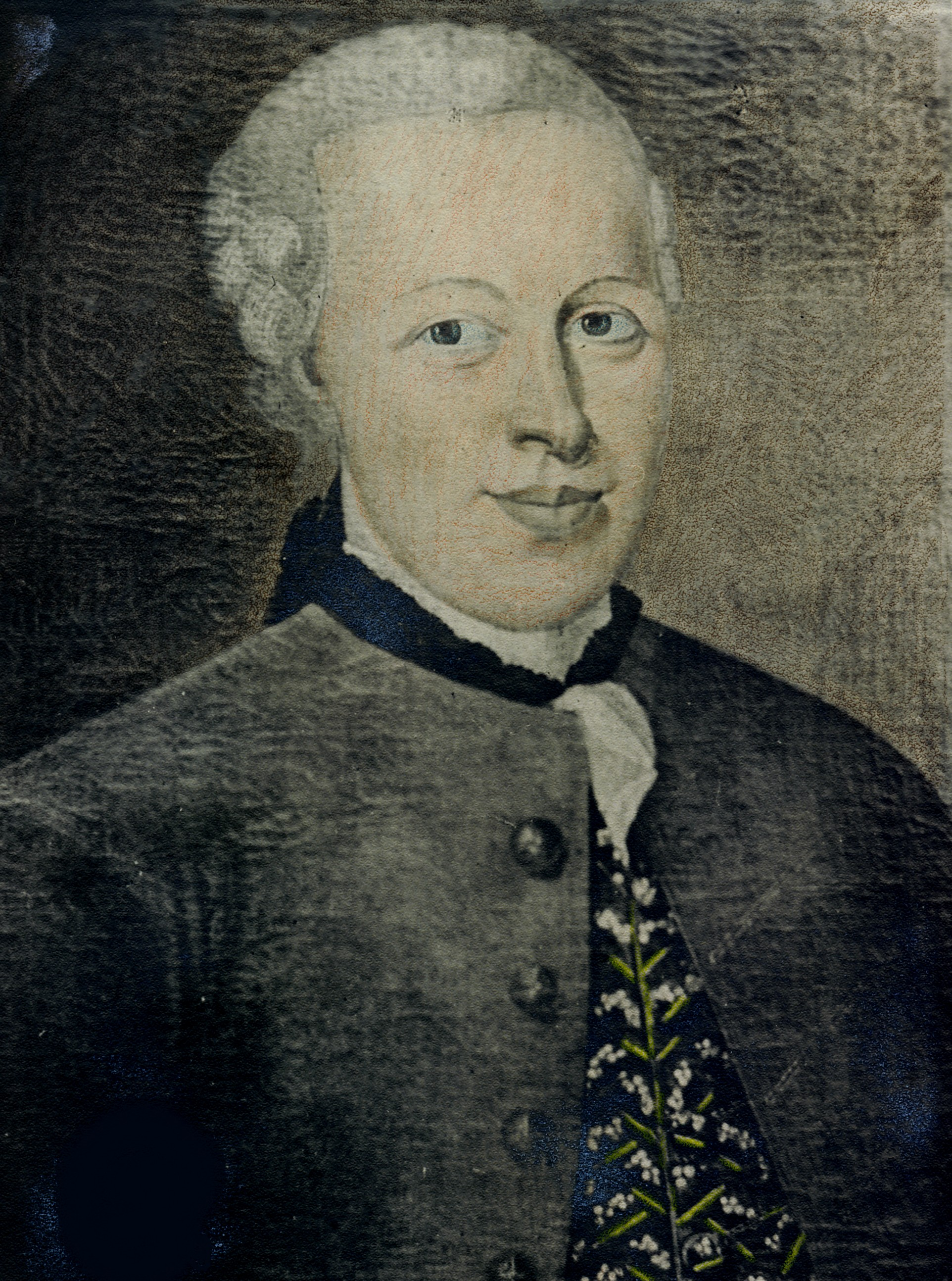
- Portrait of Joachim Christian Timm
- Born: 7 December 1734; Wangerin
- Died: 3 February 1805 (aged 70); Malchin
- Scientific career
- Fields: pharmacy, botany

Joachim Christian Timm (7 December 1734 – 3 February 1805) was a German apothecary, mayor of Malchin, and a botanist with a particular interest in cryptograms. This botanist is denoted by the author abbreviation Timm when citing a botanical name.

== Life ==
Joachim Christian Timm, the son of tobacconist Matthias Ernst Timm (1704–1779), was born in Wangerin in Farther Pomerania, Prussia (now in Poland) and attended school there. In 1749 he started a five-year apprenticeship as an apothecary, initially with Friedrich John in Wangerin, where he served for a year as an assistant. In the 1750s he was in Mecklenburg, working in Rostock. At the end of the 1750s he moved to Malchin to manage the apothecary business of Georg Heinrich Kruger and his successors. In 1760, Timm became the official apothecary of Malchin. In 1771 he was elected senator. In 1778 he became the Second or Vice-Mayor of Malchin, becoming the Mayor in 1790. The tradition of having more than one mayor to lead the town ended with his death.

As an apothecary, he was interested in botany. He enthusiastically collected plants of all kinds, especially cryptogams, primarily in the Malchin area. In 1788 he published his work Florae megapolitanae Prodromus, which he based on the system of the Swedish botanist Linnaeus. Professor Johann Hedwig of Leipzig later named a genus of moss Timmia after him, including the species he found at Malchin in Mecklenburg, Timmia megapolitana. The epithet megapolitania here refers to Mecklenburg, which was then often referred to by the Greek equivalent megapolis. At the instigation of the author of a monograph on Timmia, Guy Brassard, a mountain on the Arctic Ellesmere Island was named "Mount Timmia" in honour of Timm.

In 1762, Timm married Anna Christine Elisabeth Witte (1743–1792), a merchant's daughter from Röbel. They had ten children, including the sons Joachim (1768–1801) and Hans Timm (1774–1852), who one after the other succeeded their father as the official apothecary in Malchin. Another son, Helmuth Timm (1782–1848), became a pastor in Groß Gievitz and later in Malchin.

Joachim Christian Timm died in Malchin in 1805 and is regarded today as a pioneer of modern botany in Germany.

== References and bibliography ==
- Böttcher, M. & N. (2000), Der Landkreis Demmin Historische Stätten (in German), Stavenhagen: Khs Verlag & Service GmbH, pp. 97–101
- Bryologische Rundbriefe, No. 21, June 1995 (in German)
- Frahm, Jan-Peter & Eggers, Jens (2001), Lexikon deutschsprachiger Bryologen (in German), Norderstedt: Books on Demand GmbH (self-published), pp. 519–520
- Malchin und Remplin, Malchin in Mecklenburg: Gebrüder Böttcher, 1998, p. 20 (in German)
- Müller, Karl (1853), Deutschlands Moose (in German), Halle, p. 161
- Timm, Joachim Christian (1788), Florae Megapolitanae Prodromus, Leipzig: Müllerische Buchhandlung
