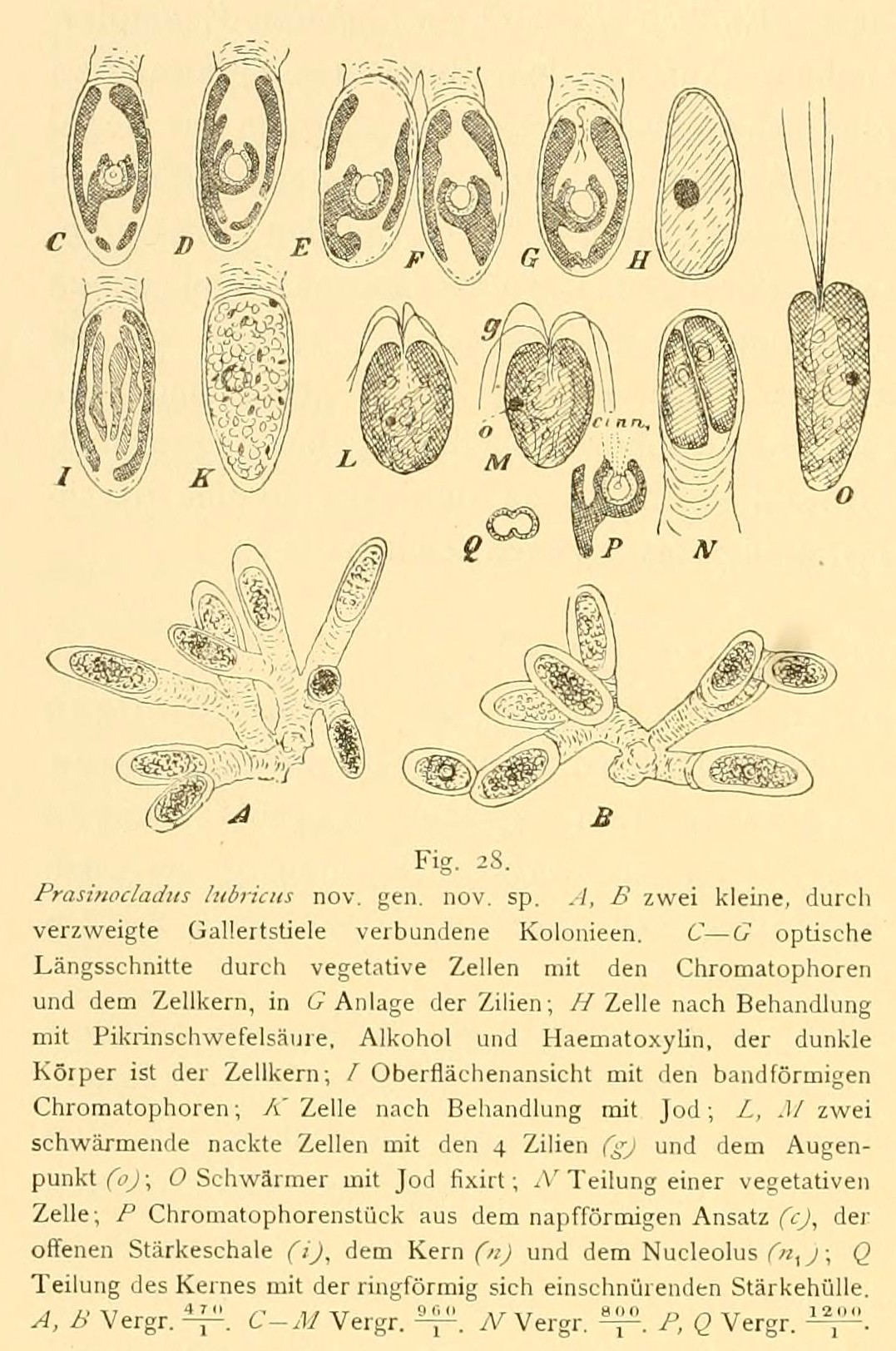
- Prasinocladus lubricus

Scientific classification
- Kingdom: Plantae
- Division: Chlorophyta
- Class: Chlorodendrophyceae
- Order: Chlorodendrales
- Family: Chlorodendraceae
- Genus: Prasinocladus; Kuckuck, 1894

Species
- P. sp. UTEX732

= Prasinocladus =

Genus of algae

Prasinocladus is a genus of green algae in the family Chlorodendraceae.
