= Oedipodiella =

Scientific classification
- Kingdom: Plantae
- Division: Bryophyta
- Class: Bryopsida
- Order: Gigaspermales
- Family: Gigaspermaceae
- Genus: Oedipodiella; Dixon
- Species: O. australis

Binomial name
- Oedipodiella australis (Wager & Dixon) Dixon

Genus of mosses

Oedipodiella is a genus of moss in the family Gigaspermaceae; it contains the single species Oedipodiella australis. This species is restricted to wooded areas of open grassland in South Africa, although a variety (O. australis var. catalaunica) is reported from Spain.
