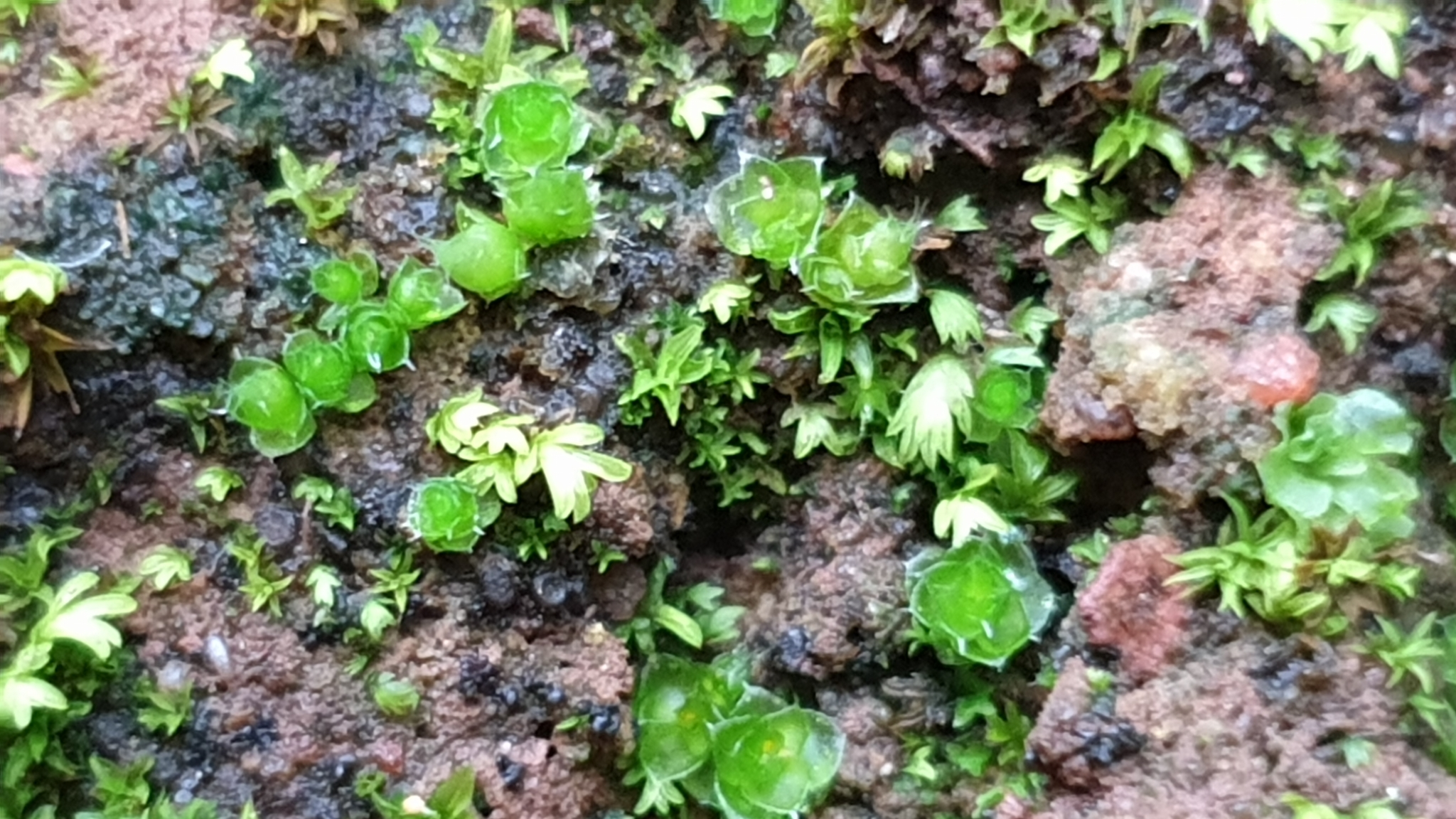
- Gigaspermum repens in Australia

Scientific classification
- Kingdom: Plantae
- Division: Bryophyta
- Class: Bryopsida
- Order: Gigaspermales
- Family: Gigaspermaceae
- Genus: Gigaspermum; Lindb.

Type species
- Gigaspermum repens (Hook.) Lindb.

Species
- Four species, see text

= Gigaspermum =

Genus of mosses

Gigaspermum is a genus of moss in the family Gigaspermaceae. It contains four species.

== Species ==
The genus Gigaspermum contains four species.

- Gigaspermum breutelii (Müll. Hal.) Paris
- Gigaspermum mouretii Corb.
- Gigaspermum repens (Hook.) Lindb.
- Gigaspermum tumidum (Mitt.) Lindb. ex Paris
