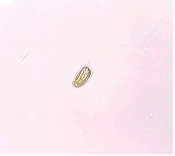

Scientific classification
- Clade: Viridiplantae
- Division: Chlorophyta
- Class: Chlorodendrophyceae
- Order: Chlorodendrales
- Family: Chlorodendraceae
- Genus: Tetraselmis
- Species: T. suecica

Binomial name
- Tetraselmis suecica (Kylin) Butcher

= Tetraselmis suecica =

Species of alga

Tetraselmis suecica is a marine green alga.

Tetraselmis suecica consists of unicellular, motile cells with four equal flagella about as long as the length of the cell, arising from a single apical furrow. The cell wall is smooth and rigid. Cells are 9–11 μm long, 7-8 μm wide, and 4.5–6 μm thick. Cells are compressed, ovoid in dorsal view and ellipsoid in lateral view. Cells contain a single, campanulate chloroplast which is dissected into two or four lobes. The chloroplast has a conspicuous basal pyrenoid surrounded by a starch sheath. The stigma is small, reddish and situated at the base of the cell near the pyrenoid. Cells contain a single central nucleus, several pale spherical bodies in the chloroplast, and several dense bodies in the apical lobes.

Reproduction occurs by division of the protoplast within the cell wall, resulting in daughter cells which have flagella prior to release. Cysts are sometimes formed within culture.

== Culture ==
T. suecica grows as single, motile cells visible under light microscope up to concentrations over one million cells per milliliter. It can be grown as a foodstock in aquaculture, being amenable to species such as rotifers of the genus Brachionus. It is a motile chlorophyte and contains a high lipid content. T. suecica proved to have cytotoxic effects on HL-60, MCF-7 and NCI-H460 tumor cells and antioxidant activity. Therefore, they could offer greater benefits as possible natural nutraceuticals for the pharmaceutical industry. More studies are necessary to identify the specific bioactive fractions of each exopolysaccharide.

Adarme-Vegas et al. (2014) state that a reduction in biomass of Tetraselmis spp. was observed in high salinity cultures (50 ppt) as well as in near-freshwater salinity cultures (5 and 10 ppt). Changes in salinity primarily altered biomass productivity with cultures in 30 and 40 ppt having the highest growth rate and final productivity. Salinity had no effect on the percentage of EPA or total fatty acid production.

== See also ==
- Algaculture
