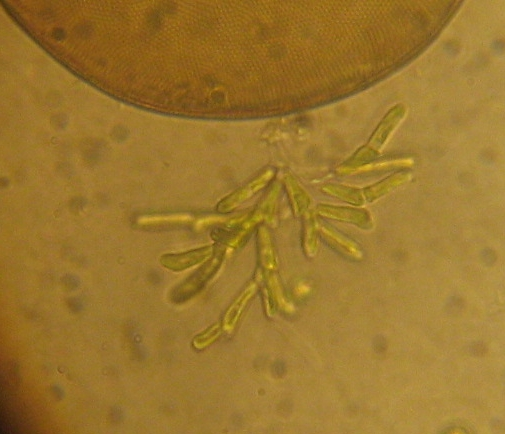
- Microthamnion sp.

Scientific classification
- Clade: Viridiplantae
- Division: Chlorophyta
- Class: Trebouxiophyceae
- Order: Microthamniales
- Family: Microthamniaceae
- Genus: Microthamnion; Nägeli

Type species
- Microthamnion kuetzingianum Nägeli ex Kützing

Species
- Microthamnion kuetzingianum

= Microthamnion =

Genus of algae

Microthamnion is a genus of green algae in the family Microthamniaceae. It is found in freshwater habitats around the world, preferably with low levels of pollution; it is typically attached to solid substrates.

== Description ==
Microthamnion consists of a microscopic, branched system of erect filaments. The filaments are uniseriate, with cylindrical cells; terminal cells are obtuse. Cells range from 1-5 μm wide and 2-15 times longer than wide. New branches form just underneath the cross-walls connecting cells. Cells are uninucleate (i.e. with one nucleus with a parietal chloroplast and no visible pyrenoids.

Reproduction occurs asexually via the formation of bottle-shaped zoospores, which are formed in vegetative cells that develop into sporangia. Typically this occurs in the terminal cells, but any cell except for the most basal may produce zoospores. The zoospores have two flagella and up to 32 are produced per sporangial cell.

== Taxonomy ==
Microthamnion was first described by Carl Nägeli in 1849 in Friedrich Traugott Kützing's work Species algarum. It is recognized as a well-defined genus, but its placement has varied. Initially placed in the family Ulotrichaceae, at times, it has been placed in Trentepohliaceae and Chaetophoraceae until finally being placed in its own family. Currently, it is placed within its own family and order in the class Trebouxiophyceae.

The species-level taxonomy of this genus is unclear, since individuals display a wide range of morphological variation. Many names have been given to forms which may be mere growth forms and not taxonomically informative. As a consequence, opinions on the number of species vary widely, ranging from as few as one very polymorphic species to as many as fourteen putative species.
