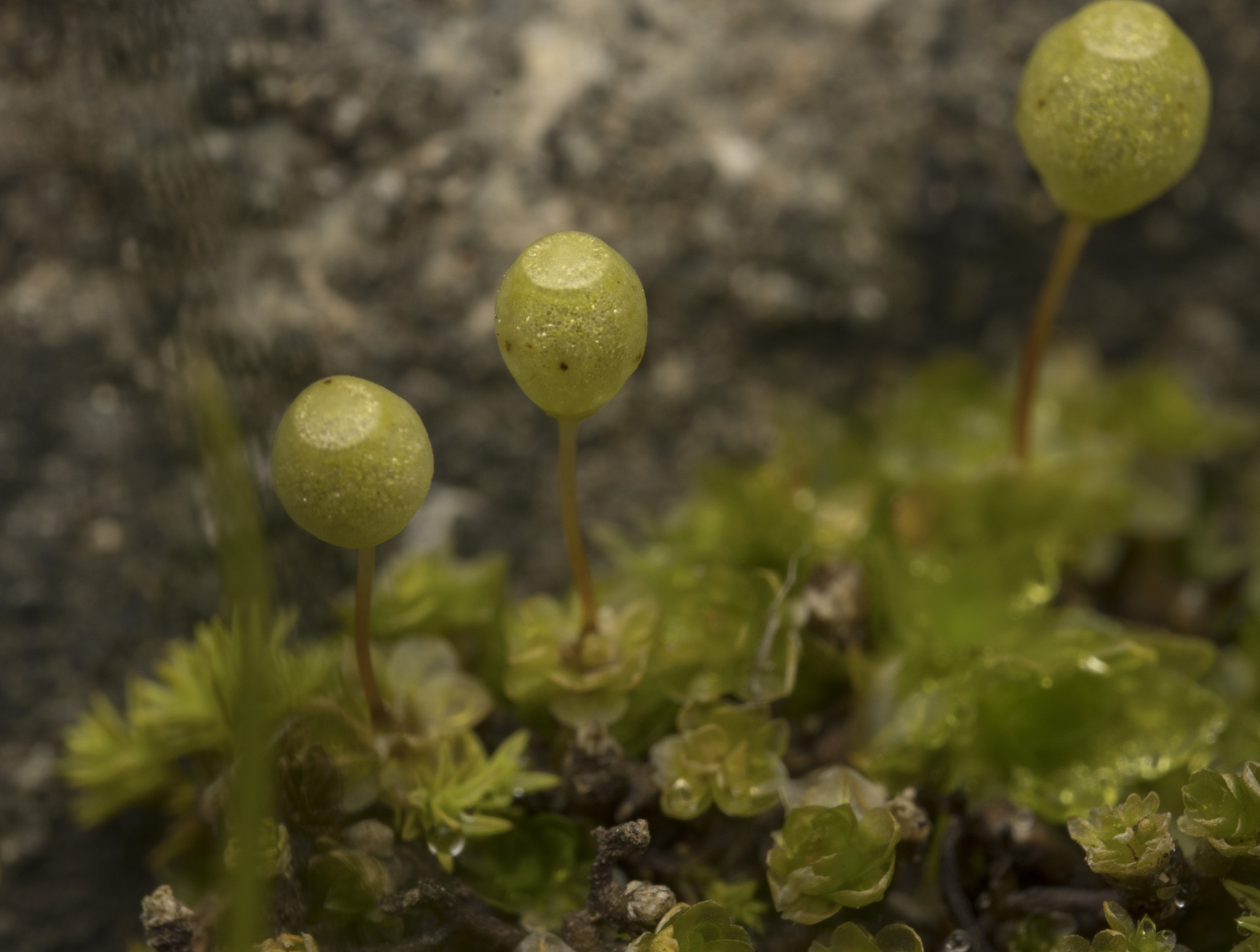
- Costesia macrocarpa in Maipo, Chile

Scientific classification
- Kingdom: Plantae
- Division: Bryophyta
- Class: Bryopsida
- Order: Gigaspermales
- Family: Gigaspermaceae
- Genus: Costesia; Thér.
- Species: C. spongiosa

Binomial name
- Costesia spongiosa Thér.

= Costesia =

Genus of mosses

Costesia is a genus of moss in the family Gigaspermaceae. The genus contains a single species Costesia spongiosa known only from South America,

The genus name of Costesia is in honour of Nathaniel Costes (1875 - 1924?), a French clergyman, naturalist and lecturer at the Collegio der Franziskaner in Santiago, Chile.

The genus was circumscribed by Marie Hypolite Irénée Thériot in Revista Chilena Hist. Nat. Vol.21 on page 12 in 1917.

Funaria macrocarpa (Funariaceae) was found to be an earlier name for Costesia spongiosa (Gigaspermaceae), it was then proposed in 2009, that the species be renamed as Costesia macrocarpa (Schimp.) Cuvertino, Miserere and Buffa. With Pottia macrocarpa Schimp another synonym.
