= Chamaebryum =

Scientific classification
- Kingdom: Plantae
- Division: Bryophyta
- Class: Bryopsida
- Order: Gigaspermales
- Family: Gigaspermaceae
- Genus: Chamaebryum; Thér. & Dixon.
- Species: C. pottioides

Binomial name
- Chamaebryum pottioides Thér. & Dixon.

Genus of mosses

Chamaebryum is a genus of moss in the family Gigaspermaceae; it contains the single species Chamaebryum pottioides. This species is endemic to southern Africa.
