= Coleochlamys =

Scientific classification
- Clade: Viridiplantae
- Division: Chlorophyta
- Class: Trebouxiophyceae
- Order: Microthamniales
- Family: Microthamniaceae
- Genus: Coleochlamys; Korshikov, 1953

Type species
- Coleochlamys apoda Korshikov

Species
- Coleochlamys apoda; Coleochlamys oleifera

Synonyms
- Fusochloris G.L.Floyd & Shin Watanabe; Rhopalocystis Schussnig

Genus of algae

Coleochlamys is a genus of green algae, in the order Microthamniales.
