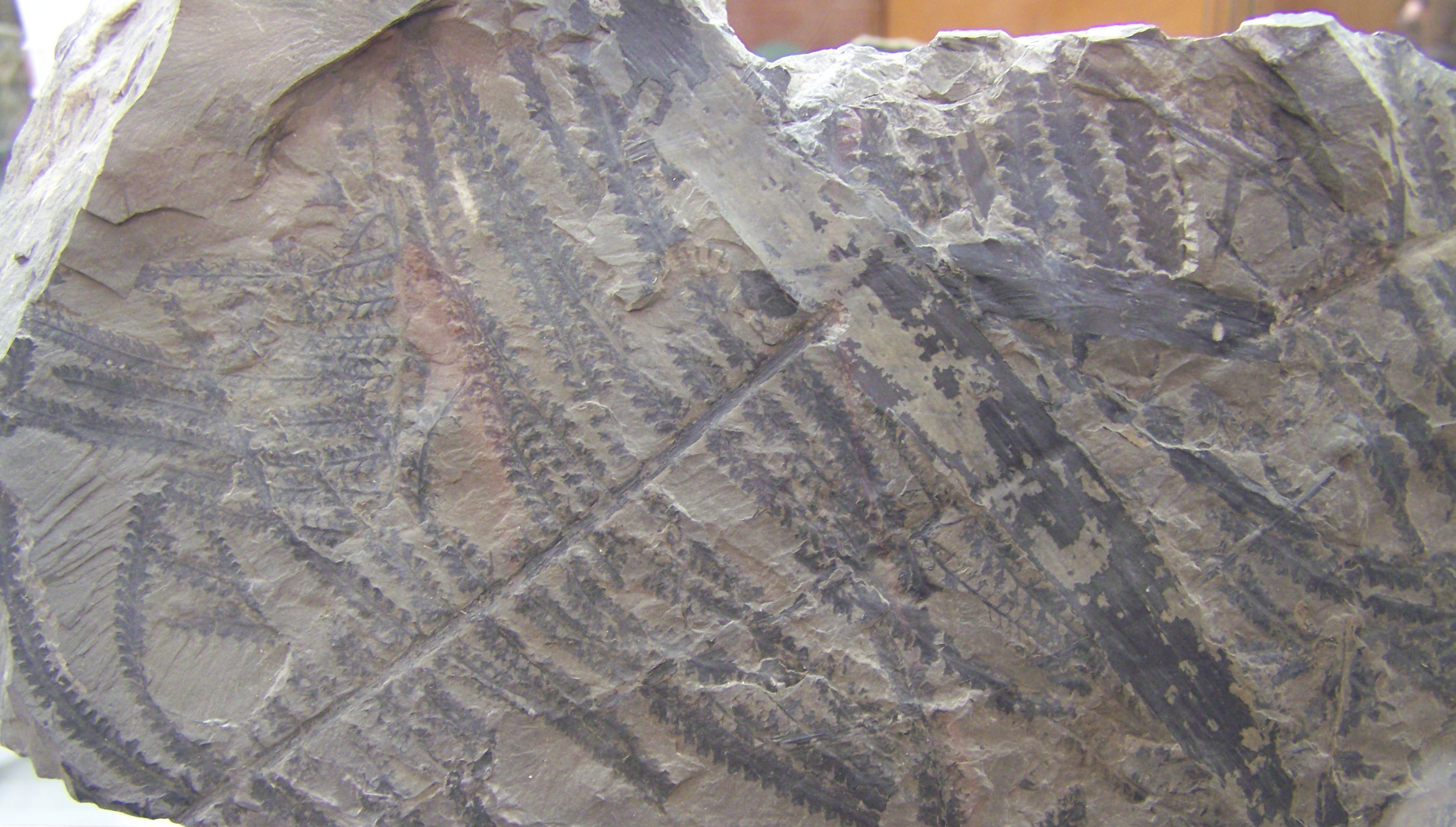
- Alloiopteris erosa

Scientific classification
- Kingdom: Plantae
- Clade: Tracheophytes
- Division: Polypodiophyta
- Class: Polypodiopsida
- Order: †Zygopteridales
- Family: †Zygopteridaceae; Scott

Genera
- †Alloiopteris; †Asterochlaenopsis; †Austroclepsis; †Biscalitheca; †Brittsia; †Clepsydropsis; †Corynepteris; †Diplolabis; †Protoclepsydropsis; †Symplocopteris; †Yulebacaulis; †Zygopteris

= Zygopteridaceae =

Zygopteridaceae Temporal range: Middle Devonian–Early Cretaceous

Extinct family of ferns

Zygopteridaceae is an extinct family of ferns or fern-like plants which lived from the Frasnian to the Berriasian (possibly as far as Cenomanian). It was first thought to have gone extinct during the Permian or the Triassic, but fossil wood assigned to Yulebacaulis was found in rocks from Queensland which are at least Berriasian in age, and palynological records indicate that the family may have survived until Mid-Cretaceous.

== Description ==
Zygopteridacean ferns were mostly herbaceous, with small weak stems and small fronds. Some genera, however, were up to 10 feet tall, with medium-sized trunks supported by a large mantle of roots and fronds reaching up to 5 ft long.

They had a cosmopolitan distribution, being found both in Laurasia and Gondwana.
