= Johann Christian Buxbaum =

German physician, botanist, entomologist and traveller

Johann Christian Buxbaum (no later than 5 October 1693 – 7 July 1730), was a German physician, botanist, entomologist and traveller. The standard author abbreviation J.C.Buxb. is used to indicate this person as the author when citing a botanical name.

He was born in Merseburg and studied medicine at the Universities of Leipzig, Wittenberg, Jena, and Leyden.

In 1721 he was invited by Peter the Great, tsar of Russia, to take up a position as botanist in the Physical Garden, at the Medical Collegium in St Petersburg. In 1724 he became a member of the St Petersburg Academy of Arts and Sciences and a professor at the Academic Gymnasium.

In his capacity as a physician, Buxbaum in 1724 was called upon to accompany Alexander Rumyantsev to Constantinopolis, in a Russian diplomatic mission to Turkey. He used this opportunity to visit Greece. On his way back from Constantinopolis he visited Asia Minor, travelling through Baku and Derbent he reached Astrachan, to return, finally, to St Petersburg (in 1727). He died in Wermsdorf, Saxony.

He is commemorated in the moss genus Buxbaumia (also the name of a journal on mosses) and in the names of several species (notably the sedge Carex buxbaumii). His most notable works are:

- Enumeratio plantarum acculatior in argo Halensi vicinisque locis crescentium una cum earum characteribus et viribus (Halle, 1721)
- Plantarum minus cognitarum centuria I. [-V.] complectens plantas circa Byzantium & in oriente observatas (Petropoli : ex typographia Academiae, 1728—1740, partly posthumously published by Johann Georg Gmelin) in five volumes with copperplates.
