= Lorentziella =

Scientific classification
- Kingdom: Plantae
- Division: Bryophyta
- Class: Bryopsida
- Order: Gigaspermales
- Family: Gigaspermaceae
- Genus: Lorentziella; Thér.
- Species: L. imbricata

Binomial name
- Lorentziella imbricata (Mitt.) Broth.

Genus of mosses

Lorentziella is a genus of moss in the family Gigaspermaceae. The genus contains a single species Lorentziella imbricata known from central Texas, Mexico, and South America (Argentina, Paraguay, & Uruguay). Imbricate lorentziella moss is a common name.
