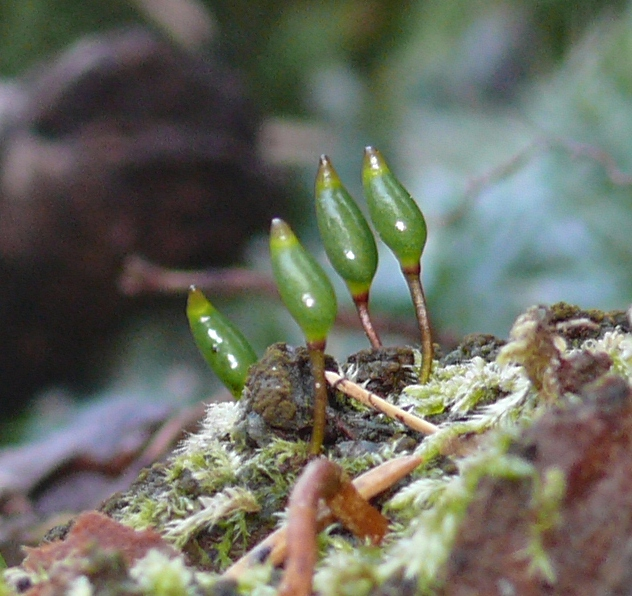

Scientific classification
- Kingdom: Plantae
- Division: Bryophyta
- Class: Bryopsida
- Order: Buxbaumiales
- Family: Buxbaumiaceae
- Genus: Buxbaumia
- Species: B. viridis

Binomial name
- Buxbaumia viridis (Moug. ex Lam. et DC.) Brid. ex Moug. et Nestl

= Buxbaumia viridis =

Species of moss

Buxbaumia viridis, also known as the green shield-moss, is a rare bryophyte found sporadically throughout the northern hemisphere. The gametophyte of this moss is not macroscopically visible; the large, distinct sporophyte of B. viridis is the only identifying structure of this moss. This moss can be found singularly or in small groups on decaying wood, mostly in humid, sub-alpine to alpine Picea abies, Abies alba, or mixed tree forests. This moss is rare and conservation efforts are being made in most countries B. viridis is found in.

== Characteristics ==
=== Gametophyte ===
The gametophyte of Buxbaumia viridis is microscopic, existing mostly as non-competitive, slow-growing protonema. It is not desiccation-tolerant. B. viridis is dioicus, with its antheridia and archegonia forming on small, singular leaves borne on the ends of the protonema. The leaves that contain the archegonia are not present long as they quickly develop into sporophytes. Fertilization usually happens mid-spring to early summer.

=== Sporophyte ===
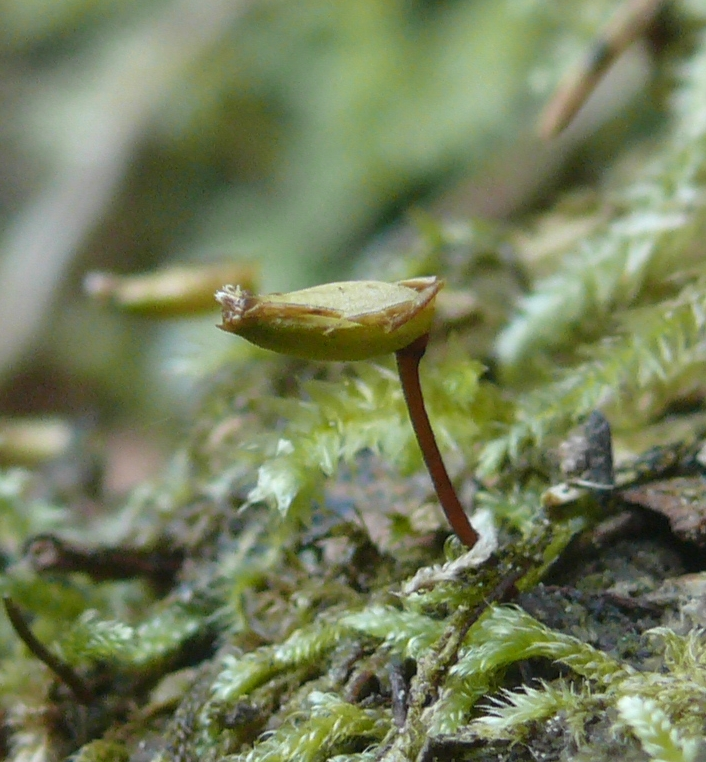
Cuticle of B. viridis peeling back from sporophyte.

The sporophyte of Buxbaumia viridis is characteristic of the moss and is usually the only way to identify its presence in an area. The seta is straight and measures 5-10mm. The capsule is asymmetrical. The immature capsule is green, shiny, and may have an opalescent sheen due to the waxy cuticle covering it. The cuticle is a made of wax and contains way granules and crystals; this type of cuticle is associated with a few other mosses and liverworts such as in the Polytrichopsida and Marchantiaceae, as well as tracheophytes. After the capsule matures in late summer to early fall, it develops its asymmetric shape and turns brown. The cuticle also begins to peel back, taking part of the epidermis with it. This gives the capsule a stringy appearance as the cuticle curls and frays. The sporophyte has an operculum, and this falls off to disperse spores. Spore count can rage from 1.4 to 9.0 million, which is a much higher number compared to other mosses. Sporophytes mature over the winter, and sporophytes can be found any time of year.

== Habitat ==
Buxbaumia viridis is an epixylic species, meaning it lives on wood surfaces. It favors heavily decayed wood, usually to the point where the decayed wood is deformed (30–60 years old depending on species and size). It does not grow exclusively to one tree species, but it is found more often on conifer species such as Picea abies and Abies alba; it can also be found on other conifers and deciduous trees such as Fagus sylvatica. Rarely it can be found on mineral soil or humus.

B. viridis also requires constant humidity and shady or sheltered areas to survive. Dry conditions can lead to protonema death, a reduction in spore count, and decreased germination.

B. viridis exists in sub-alpine to alpine forests with extensive decaying wood.

== Distribution ==
Buxbaumia viridis is widely distributed across the northern hemisphere, although populations are scattered and individual plants are scarce. B. viridis is found in most of Europe, southwestern Asia, and Western North America.

== Ecology ==
Buxbaumia viridis is a poor competitor, likely because it exists mostly as protonema. It is known to co-occur with some other species of mosses and liverworts such as Herzogiella seligeri, Rhizomnium punctatum, Dicranum scoparium, Tetraphis pellucida, and Chiloscyphus profundus. Due to the moss being dioicous, having low fertilization rates, and not being desiccation tolerant, this leads to low establishment rates. Fertilization of the archegonia happens mid spring to early summer, and maturation and spore dispersal of the sporophytes happens late spring to early summer.

B. viridis is not a long-lived species due to the nature of its preferred substrate. The advanced stage of decay of the substrate means it is vulnerable to significant change, and this means B. viridis may not be present at the same site from one year to the next. B. viridis requires large amount of decayed wood for growth and future establishment; the mass of strongly decayed wood in an area is a good predictor of the presence of B. viridis.

Although a generally unrecorded behavior on mosses, herbivory on B. viridis sporophytes has been observed. Cut setas have been observed with an unknown perpetrator. Small slugs from the Arion genus have also been observed scraping the outer part of the capsule to eat the spores inside. It is unlikely that slug herbivory has any benefit to B. viridis, and accounts for 30% of sporophyte loss.

It is likely that the actual number of individual B.viridis plants are higher than the recorded number because it can exist as protonema without producing a sporophyte, thus going undetected.

== Conservation ==
=== Status ===
Buxbaumia viridis is at risk of extinction; it is classified as vulnerable in Europe by the European Committee for the Conservation of Bryophytes and it is on the European Red-List for bryophytes. It is protected by law in Europe and most European countries are required to monitor it.

=== Threats ===
Its poor establishment rates, poor competitive ability, scattered populations, and its sensitivity to environmental changes put Buxbaumia viridis at risk of extinction. Anthropogenic activities also threaten this moss; forest management practices often reduce the amount of decaying material present in a forest, and this affects the ability of B.viridis to establish new populations. Forestry practice such as clearcutting is one of the largest threats to this moss as it reduces new potential areas for establishment and removes cover.

Some forest management practices can be helpful; breaking up substrate reduces the competition B. viridis experiences from other bryophytes.
