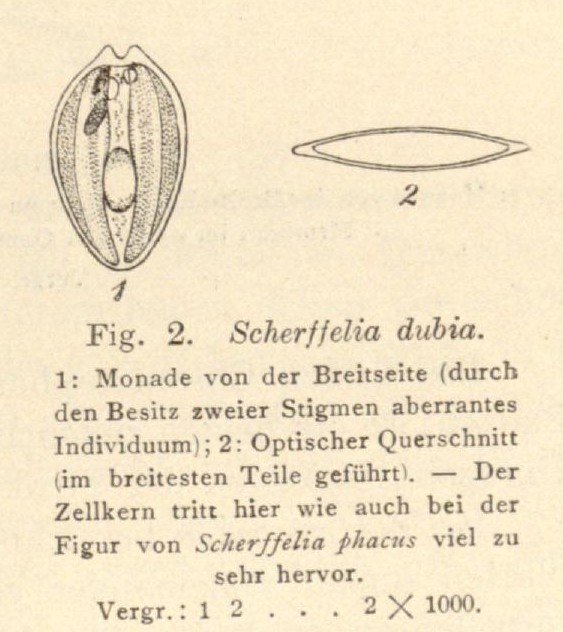

Scientific classification
- Kingdom: Plantae
- Division: Chlorophyta
- Class: Chlorodendrophyceae
- Order: Chlorodendrales
- Family: Chlorodendraceae
- Genus: Scherffelia; Pascher

Type species
- Scherffelia dubia (Perty) Pascher

= Scherffelia =

Genus of algae

Scherffelia is a genus of green algae in the family Chlorodendraceae. It is widespread in freshwater, brackish, and marine habitats, but is often overlooked due to its small size.

The genus was circumscribed by Adolf A. Pascher in Lotos vol.59 on page 341 in 1911.

The genus name of Scherffelia is in honour of Aladár Scherffel (1865–1938), who was a Hungarian botanist (Algology) and mycologist.

== Description ==
Scherffelia is a unicellular organism. The cells are ovoid or ellipsoid, strongly flattened and sometimes somewhat twisted along their longitudinal axes. The anterior apex has a small depression from which four equal flagella emerge. The cell is surrounded by a wall (termed a theca) composed of fused organic scales, which may be reddish in color. The lateral margins of the theca are winged.

Cells contain a single central nucleus and two (rarely three) contractile vacuoles) at the anterior. There are two chloroplasts, which lack pyrenoids. An eyespot (stigma) is usually present.

Scherffelia swims while rotating along its longitudinal axis; it travels in a straight line but may abruptly change its direction.

== Reproduction ==
Scherffelia reproduces asexually. The cell contents divide into four within the theca, and become four daughter cells/zoospores. Sexual reproduction has not been observed in Scherffelia.

== Species ==
As accepted by WoRMS;

- Scherffelia bichlora (H.Ettl & O.Ettl) Massjuk & Lilitsk, 2006
- Scherffelia deformis Skuja, 1939
- Scherffelia dubia (Perty) Pascher, 1912
- Scherffelia incisa (Nygaard) Massjuk & Lilitsk, 2006
- Scherffelia pelagica Skuja, 1948
- Scherffelia phacus Pascher, 1912

Former Species;

- S. opisthostigma Skuja, 1948 accepted as Scherffelia dubia
- S. ovata Pascher, 1927 accepted as Scherffelia dubia
