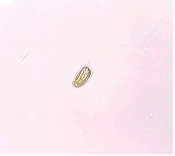
- Tetraselmis suecica

Scientific classification
- Kingdom: Plantae
- Division: Chlorophyta
- Class: Chlorodendrophyceae
- Order: Chlorodendrales
- Family: Chlorodendraceae
- Genus: Tetraselmis; F.Stein, 1878

Type species
- Tetraselmis cordiformis (H.J.Carter) F.Stein

Species
- See text

Synonyms
- Platymonas G.S.West, 1916

= Tetraselmis =

Genus of algae

Tetraselmis is a genus of phytoplankton. Tetraselmis is a green algal genus within the order Chlorodendrales, and they are characterized by their green chloroplast, their four-flagellate cell bodies, the presence of a pyrenoid within the chloroplast, and a scale-produced thecal-wall. Species within this genus are found in both marine and freshwater ecosystems across the globe; their habitat range is mainly limited by water depth due to their photosynthetic nature. Thus, they live in diverse water environments if enough nutrients and light are available for net photosynthetic activity. Tetraselmis species have proven to be useful for both research and industry. Tetraselmis species have been studied for understanding plankton growth rates, and recently a colonial species is being used to gain an understanding of multicellularity evolution. Additionally, many species are currently being examined for their use as biofuels due to their high lipid content.

== History ==
The genus name was first presented to the scientific community in Germany in 1878 by F. von Stein. The genus Tetraselmis has undergone several taxonomic changes, largely due to more advanced research techniques (such as electron microscopy) that have aided scientists in their classification.

== Location and ecology ==
Tetraselmis species are found in both marine and freshwater ecosystems, and they occupy niches as primary producers in benthic and planktonic food webs. They can be found in many global waters, and their main enforcer of habitat range is light availability which restricts cells to the photic zone of the water column. The primary producers of aquatic ecosystems are mostly unicellular photosynthetic plankton, which includes Tetraselmis. Planktonic photoautotrophs are important components of aquatic food webs because they form the first trophic level. Most Tetraselmis species are free-living, however, some species are symbionts within animals. Marine species often populate rapidly and densely, causing plankton blooms in shoreline and bay areas. Tetraselmis is a specifically important genus for studying and understanding plankton growth rate dynamics.

== Cell morphology ==
Tetraselmis species vary greatly in cell size and shape. Cells can be round, ovoid, elliptical, flattened, compressed, or a combination of these shapes, in which their side lengths can vary in range from 3.5 to 25 μm. Tetraselmis cells have four flagella of equal length, which emerge from a depression near the apex. In most species, the flagella emerge in pairs and project away from each other. Generally, individual cells travel in a linear fashion for a long period of time, and then rapidly change direction without stopping, in which their flagella generate force for motion through an aqueous environment.

They have a single large chloroplast, usually with four anterior lobes, which occupies most of the cytoplasmic compartment. Some species have reduced or no lobes, and some have developed posterior lobes. Like other green algal lineages, the thylakoids and lamellae have no set number or pattern within the chloroplast. The chloroplast contains one pyrenoid, which is encircled in a starch-shell, and one eyespot. The pyrenoid is usually central within the cell; the location of the stigma however, varies from species largely due to cell size and shape. The stigma is composed of two lipid-granule layers separated by a single thylakoid, which are parallel with the chloroplast membrane. Stigmas are a concentration of pigment granules which the cell uses to detect light allowing them to orientate themselves within the water column. Both the pyrenoid and the stigma can be used for taxonomic classification due to their reliable and inherent positioning in species. See figure 1 for a visual representation of the position of the chloroplast, stigma, pyrenoid, and flagellar depression.

The nucleus of the cell lies between the anterior lobes of the chloroplast in parallel with the pyrenoid, and some species have developed anterior nuclear lobes. The nucleus is centrally located and is parallel with the flagellar depression and pyrenoid. Additionally, condensed chromatin can be viewed in the nucleus of certain species. See figure 1 for nuclear positioning within cells. The Golgi of Tetraselmis species has a distinct number of Golgi bodies usually within the range of 2–4, but species can have up to 8 or more. This is a reliable characteristic that is used to help classify species. Golgi bodies lie between the chloroplast and the basal bodies; cis-Golgi face the chloroplast and trans-Golgi face the basal bodies. Mitochondria are randomly dispersed throughout the cytoplasm. The cytoplasm may contain additional organelles and macromolecules such as lipid droplets, vacuoles, and lysosomes. Additionally, the starch produced by Tetraselmis is the same as those produced from land plants.

The theca of most species closely encloses the cell body, but can become separated due to irregularities in cell shape. Theca are usually smooth, but some species have developed distinct creases that cross perpendicularly near the cell apex, giving the cell the appearance of being divided into four longitudinal sections. Some species also have a twisted cell posterior that is mirrored in the thecal wall produced. The only perforation of the theca is where the flagella emerge, which is termed the apical depression. The pore is a long slit with thecal extensions that border it, extending upwards to protect the flagella base. In cells that have lost their flagella the thecal extensions grow to cover the slit, but they do not fuse; non-motile cells of Tetraselmis have flagellar stubs that remain within the thecal compartment. Additionally, many species have thick curly hairs anchored to the cell wall near the flagellar base. The hairs are cross striated and have a spiral pattern, which is similar to flagellar hairs, but they are thicker and longer than flagellar hairs. Scale production begins during prophase, and the scales are brought to the cell membrane promptly after completion of cytokinesis and the two daughter cells are separated. Fusion of the scales happens externally and begins near the posterior end, extending forwards to the anterior end in which the flagellar slit forms last.

=== Flagella ===
Each cell has four flagella of equal length, in which the flagella are shorter than the length of the cell. The flagella emerge from the apical depression in pairs and point in opposite directions, running parallel to the long side of the cell. Due to their emergence from a deep depression, the mechanical force the flagella can produce is restricted. Other lineages with non-depressed flagellar insertions can produce higher amounts of flagellar force, because the flagellar base is not geometrically limited. The flagella of Tetraselmis species are thick, covered in mucilaginous material, and have a blunt end. They are also covered in flagellar hairs which are loosely attached to the cell exterior; they are cross-striated with two scale layers on flagella. See figure 3 for a detailed picture of flagella including their scales and hair. The inner layer is compact and densely covers the flagella, and hair cells are attached to the cell membrane through small sections of membrane that are not covered due to patterning. The outer scale layer is made of small-round scales which are mainly used to overlap bare membrane not covered by the inner scales. The inner scales are larger than the outer scales, and usually resemble a pentagon or square in shape. See figure 1 for a generalized drawing of flagellar scales. The flagellar hairs have a distinct sequence of structural components, the proximal filament connects the flagellum and cell surface, this is followed by the tubular shaft, then the transition zone in which the shaft is modified, followed by a stretch of linear globular subunits, and the hair ends with a distal filament. The distal filament and transition zone are the only components that are not produced by certain species. Flagellar hairs have a fixed number of distal subunit repeats, which varies between 2 and 44 subunits depending on the species. Thus, flagellar hairs are a good morphological tool for species comparison and classification. Figure 1 includes these hairs on the flagella drawing. Species use their flagella to travel in straight lines while rotating along their axis, in which they travel in one direction for long distances and then abruptly change directions instantaneously without stopping. Some species differ from this pattern of movement and move in less rigid and structured fashion.

== Life cycle ==
Tetraselmis species have three life stages which includes a flagellated stage, a vegetative non-motile stage, and a cyst stage. The vegetative non-motile stage is the dominant life-stage of most species. The only structural difference between the flagellated and vegetative stage is the number of scale layers in the thecal-wall; the flagellated stage only ever has one layer, while the vegetative state has two or more. Cells in the cyst stage lose their flagella, and are termed as being aflagellate, and they produce a thick thecal-shell for protection. During any of the life stages it is possible for Tetraselmis species to undergo a complete transformation and develop flagella, becoming motile.

Tetraselmis species undergo cell division during the non-motile stage, producing two daughter cells, and most species only undergo one division cycle. During cell division, organelles divide synchronously before nuclear division. Cell division is aided by a phycoplast, which is a microtubule structure that helps the cell divide the nuclei into each daughter cell. Daughter cells can develop into flagellated cells or remain non-motile, depending on environmental conditions. Additionally, vegetative cells whether flagellate or immotile are anchored to the thecal wall by four microtubule contact points.

== Practical importance ==
Tetraselmis species have been important for cellular biology research, for studying plankton growth cycles, and they may have future use in biofuel production. For example, the species T. indica is being used to study how asymmetric cell-division during mitosis results in clonal cell heterogeneity. This species forms a clonal colony in which the cells are morphologically and ultrastructurally different, and many cells specialize and develop independent physical properties. The asymmetric division of daughter cells results in the unequal division of both cytoplasm and nucleoplasm. Scientists believe this phenomenon allows clones to form “sub-populations” that remain close to one another, in which the cells cooperate with one another and act as one large population. Asymmetric cell division clearly plays an important role in the production of phenotypically diverse cells in multicellular systems, and this has important implications for multicellular organisms, humans included.

Tetraselmis and other microalgae species are used as food in aquaculture, and for biotechnology uses. Tetraselmis species, along with other microalgae are a promising source for biofuel use due to their fast growth rate, high lipid content, cheaper photosynthetic mechanisms, less need for agricultural land, useful by-products, and for being environmentally friendly. Research is currently being performed into specific microalgae species for biofuel use. Tetraselmis has a very high lipid level; their amino acids stimulate feeding in marine organisms.

The exopolysaccharides of T. suecica have antioxidant activity and cytotoxic effects on tumor cells; therefore, they could offer greater advantages as possible natural nutraceuticals for the pharmaceutical industry. Despite not being generally recognized as safe yet, proteins from Tetraselmis sp. have been investigated as functional food ingredients for the stabilization of emulsions and foams.

== Additional information ==
Tetraselmis is green, motile, and usually grows 10 μm long × 14 μm wide. The species T. convolutae is a symbiont of the acoelomate animal Symsagittifera roscoffensis (and can also live freely in the ocean).

== Species ==
- Tetraselmis alacris Butcher
- Tetraselmis apiculata (Butcher) Butcher
- Tetraselmis ascus (Proskauer) R. E. Norris, Hori & Chihara
- Tetraselmis astigmatica R. E. Norris & Hori
- Tetraselmis chui Butcher
- Tetraselmis convolutae Parke & Manton
- Tetraselmis cordiformis (N. Carter) S. F. N. Stein
- Tetraselmis desikacharyi Matin, Hoef-Emden & Melkonian
- Tetraselmis gracilis (Kylin) Butcher
- Tetraselmis hazeni Butcher
- Tetraselmis impellucida (McLachlan & Parke) Norris, Hori & Chihara
- Tetraselmis inconspicua Butcher
- Tetraselmis levis Butcher
- Tetraselmis maculata Butcher
- Tetraselmis marina (Cienkowski) R. E. Norris, Hori & Chihara
- Tetraselmis micropapillata
- Tetraselmis rubens Butcher
- Tetraselmis striata Butcher
- Tetraselmis suecica (Kylin) Butcher
- Tetraselmis tetrabrachia inedit.
- Tetraselmis tetrathele (West) Bucher
- Tetraselmis verrucosa Butcher
- Tetraselmis wettsteinii (Schiller) Throndsen
