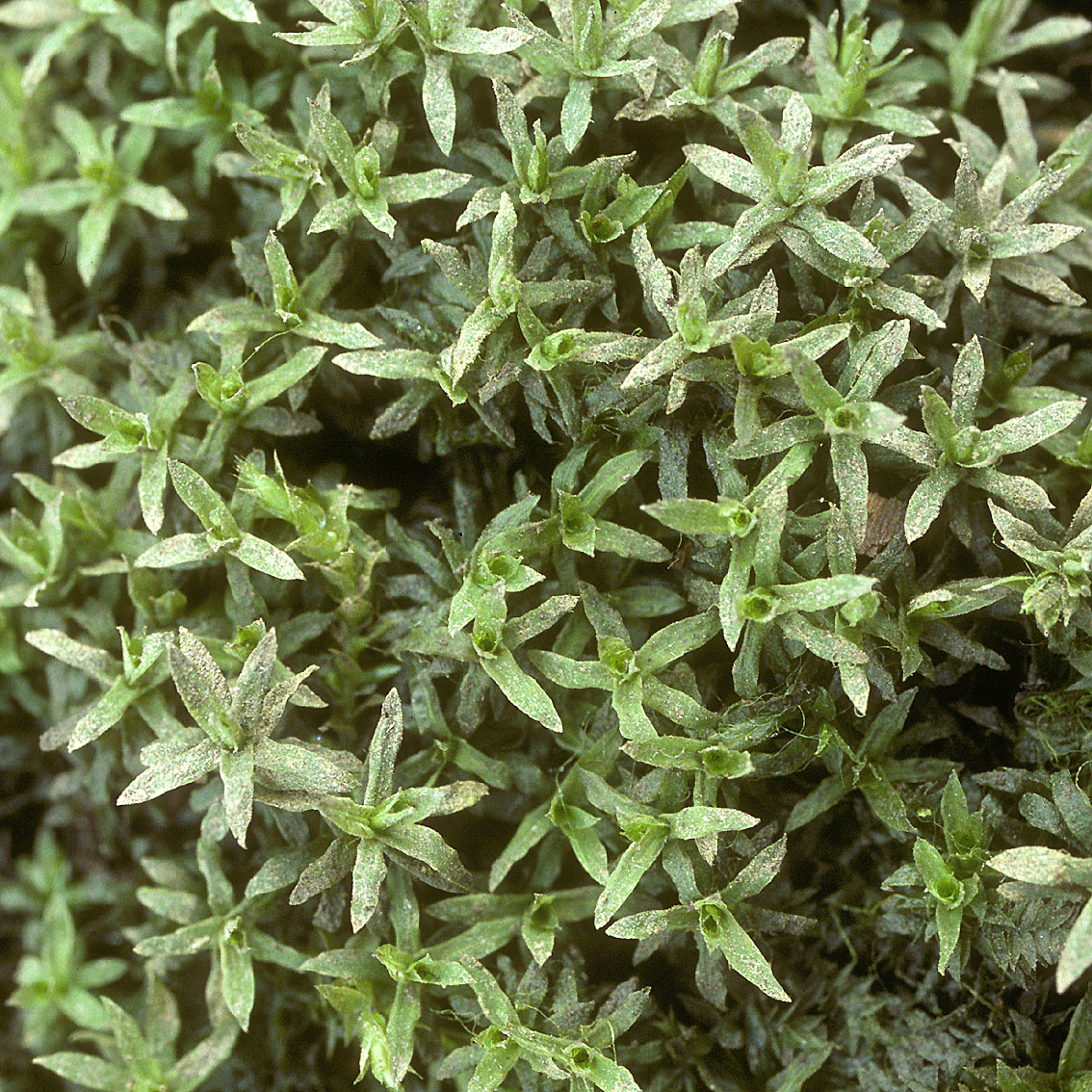

Scientific classification
- Kingdom: Plantae
- Division: Bryophyta
- Class: Bryopsida
- Order: Timmiales
- Family: Timmiaceae
- Genus: Timmia
- Species: T. megapolitana

Binomial name
- Timmia megapolitana Hedw.

= Timmia megapolitana =

Species of moss

Timmia megapolitana, also known as Indian feather moss and warrior moss, is a genus of moss in the family Timmiaceae and order Timmiales.

== Morphology ==
Timmia megapolitana is a medium sized and deep green moss that has large leaves that are coarsely serrated in the free portion of the leaf and entirely in the sheathing part of the leaf. The leaves are on average 4–5 mm long with the adaxial leaf surface bulging mammilose while the abaxial surface is not. It can be found in loose aggregations or individual stems. The stems are on average 2–6 cm high following a simple or branched pattern. When the leaves become dry they curl up into a tubular shape but spread when moist. The spores are on average 10-14 μm in diameter with a yellow color and rough surface.

The stems are on average 2–6 cm high following a simple or branched pattern. When the leaves become dry they curl up into a tubular shape but spread when moist. The spores are on average 10-14 μm in diameter with a yellow color and rough surface.

== Distribution ==
Timmia megapolitana is found in North America, Europe, China, Japan, Mongolia and Russia

While the family Timmiaceae is mostly found in the northern hemisphere T. megapolitana has been identified to follow an Arctic-montane distribution pattern and can easily be found in mountainous regions. It has also been found to be common in temperate regions in North America near rivers and in Europe within lowland areas near the Baltic sea.

== Habitat and ecology ==
Near marshes or locations of high water content, on wet soil or rocks near streams, grasslands or in bogs, needs constant water supply.

It is commonly found around habitats with large water content as it needs a constant water supply. It can be found on wet soil, rock near streams, grasslands, marshes or bogs. T. megapolitana has been found growing in wet horizontal willow steps, roots, and fallen branches within ditches that contain clay. It was also found to be surrounded by many other bryophytes in abundance.

Timmia megapolitana can also be found at upper elevations in mixed conifer forests. It was found in the northern part of Estonia within moist and shady forest near coastal calcareous cliffs and found in Pine forests that have been exposed to calcareous dust from nearby quarries on the decaying tree stumps of Salix caprea. In Germany and Poland the species was found to be in calcareous marshy meadows, hayfield, and on slopes of marl.

In eastern North America, T. megapolitana is found in river bottoms swamps, moist and shaded soil or humus, and rarely at the base of trees. It has also been identified on the banks of ravines or on the crevices of cliffs. Both Siberia and the Netherlands share similar habitats for T. megapolitana in which the species is found on mud-covered willows in forests along rivers. The willows it was found on were mostly Salix viminalis.

Timmia has been found to often be covered with silt and is restricted to a part of the Biesbosch with small scale tidal divides. It has been found near tidal floods along with algae of the genus Vaucheria catching silt and allowing vascular plants to germinate.

== Reproduction ==
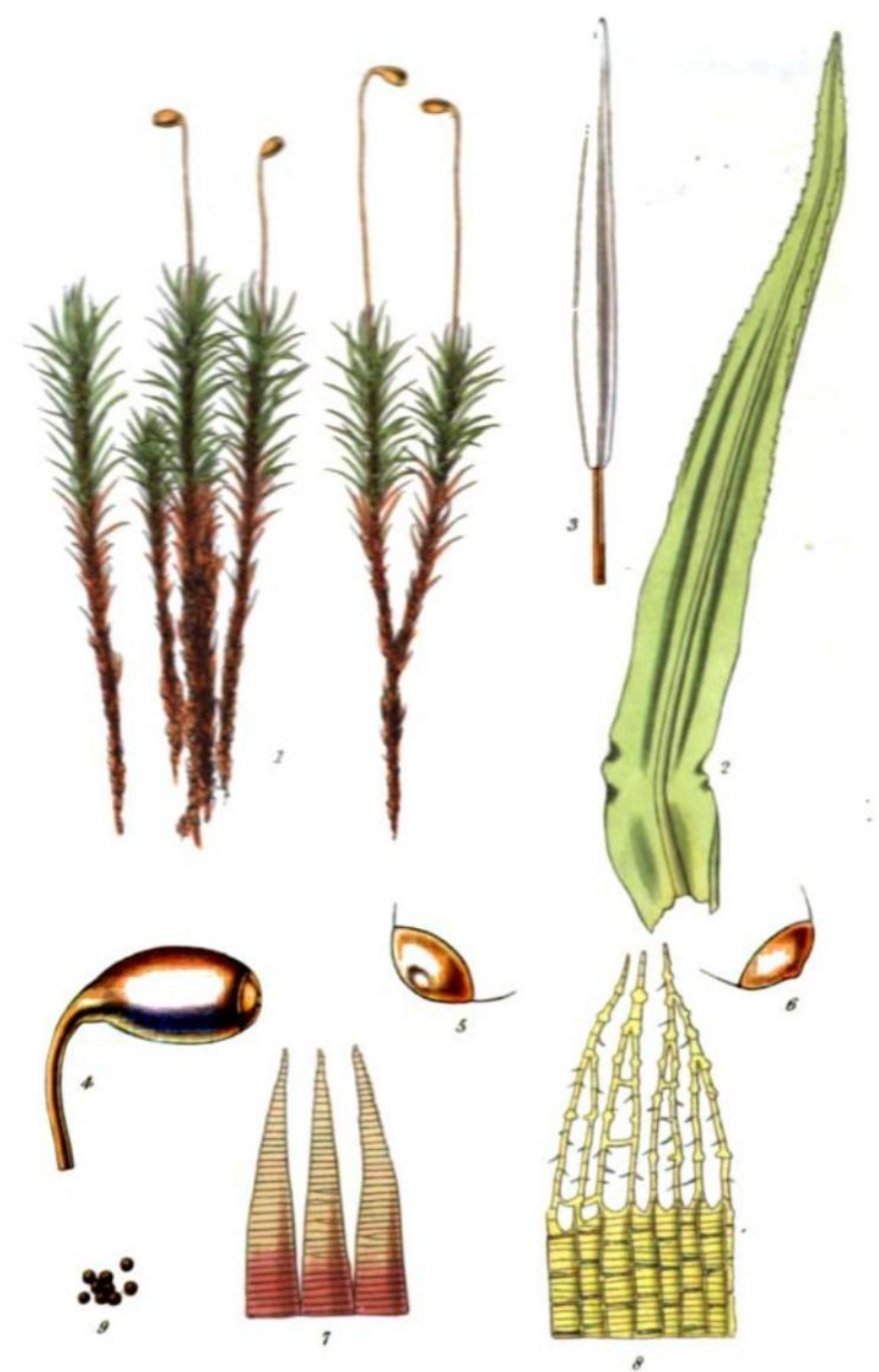
Timmia megapolitana (desc. given by the author): Fig. 1. T. megapolitana, natural size. Fig. 2. Leaf. Fig. 3. Young calyptra. Fig. 4. Capsule. Fig. 5. Lid of T. megapolitana. Fig. 6. Lid of T. austriaca of authors. Fig. 7. Teeth of the outer peristome. Fig. 8. Portion of the inner peristome, without segments.

Timmia megapolitana is monoicous. Like all mosses, it utilizes alternation of generation. This means that during their life cycle, they alternate between two generations where they’re either in a sexual or asexual phase. In the gametophyte generation, this is where they produce gametes while in the sporophyte generation this is where they produce spores. In bryophytes, the dominant generation is the gametophyte which means that the sporophyte generation depends on it. The gametophytes have male reproductive organs called antheridia and female reproductive organs called archegonia. For fertilization, they use water as a mode of transmission for the sperm to swim to the egg. When fertilization takes place, a zygote is produced and this eventually develops into a sporophyte onto the gametophyte plant (which is the parent). The sporophyte then goes on to make spores that are haploid which can then eventually become gametophyte plants in the next generation.

=== Disperal ===
Timmia megapolitana is considered to be dispersed by ducks and geese. It does not have flowers or fruit and because it is a moss, it produces spores as a means to reproduce.

== Conservation status ==
According to the IUCN, the overall conservation status of T. megapolitana is LC (least concern). The threats identified consist mostly of pollution and Agricultural and forestry effluents. The habitat of this species needs access to water however the threats mentioned affect this. It was observed that in Poland the species was threatened with extinction due to road construction in the 1930s, which most likely destroyed a subpopulation of the species on the roadside back near Elblag.

It is also in the Red lists of Germany and Poland as Extinct, Critically Endangered in Spain and Romania, Endangered in Ukraine, Globally Endangered in the Netherlands, Regionally Extinct in Finland, and Vulnerable in Great Britain and Estonia.

It has been argued that even though it appears to be conserved in eastern European countries due to its rarity and disappearances, T. megapolitana should be recognized as a Red List species on a European scale.

=== Threats ===
Pollution and Agricultural & forestry effluents.

== Medicinal ==
Many species of moss are used for medicinal purposes. It has been most often used as a way to treat various ailments such as the common cold and hypertension due to its diuretic properties.
