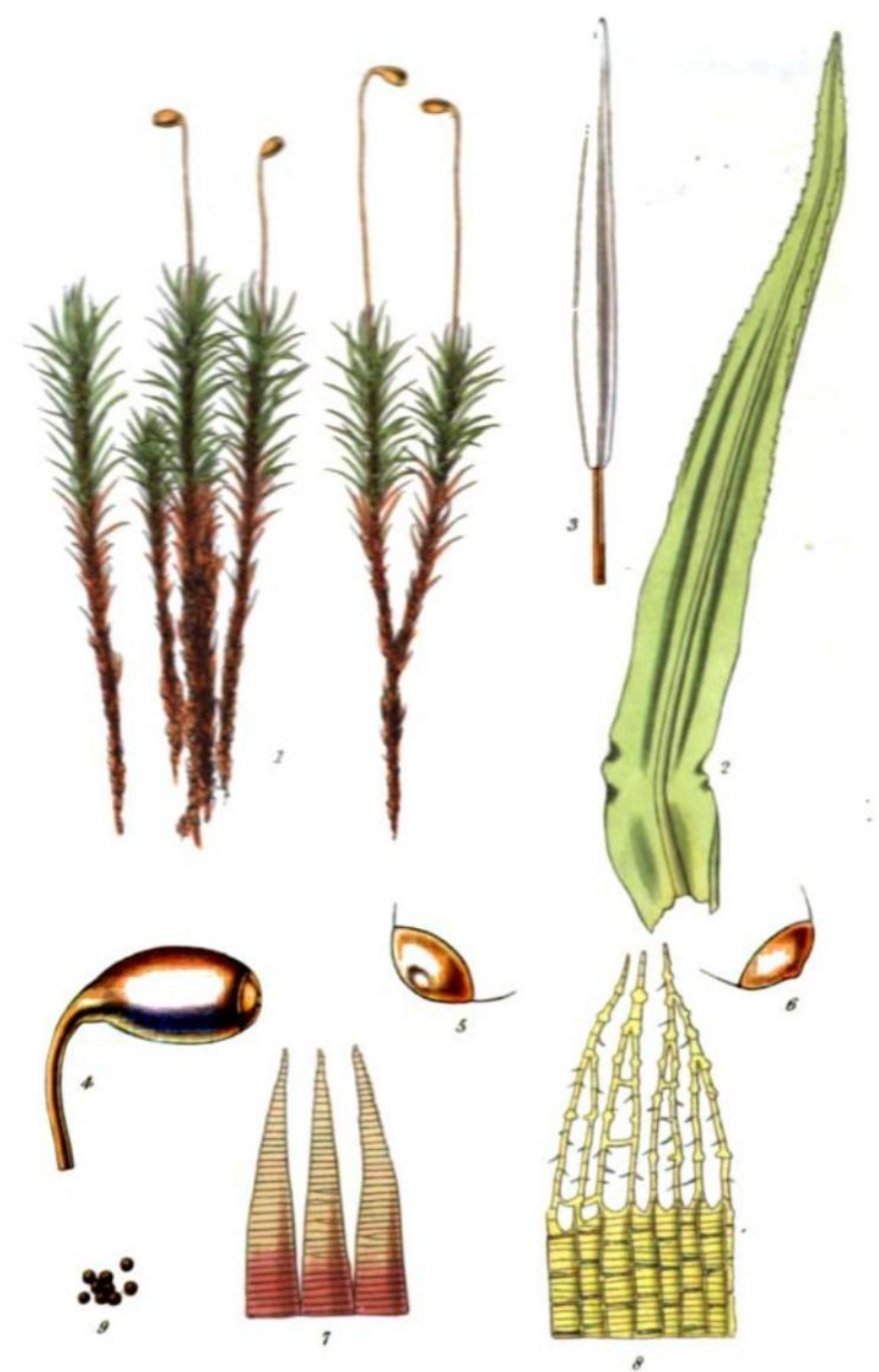
- Timmia megapolitana

Scientific classification
- Kingdom: Plantae
- Division: Bryophyta
- Class: Bryopsida
- Subclass: Timmiidae; Ochyra
- Order: Timmiales; Ochyra
- Family: Timmiaceae; Schimp.
- Genus: Timmia; Hedw., 1801

Species
- Timmia austriaca; Timmia megapolitana; Timmia norvegica; Timmia sibirica

= Timmia =

Genus of mosses

Timmia is a genus of moss. It is the only genus in the family Timmiaceae and order Timmiales. The genus is named in honor of the 18th-century German botanist Joachim Christian Timm.

The genus Timmia includes only four species:

Genus Timmia

Timmia austriaca
Timmia megapolitana
Timmia norvegica
Timmia sibirica

- - Oedipodiopsida
  - - - Tetraphidopsida
      - Polytrichopsida
      - Bryopsida
        - Buxbaumiidae
        - - Diphysciidae
          - - Timmia
            - Funariidae
            - Dicranidae
            - Bryidae

The species and phylogenetic position of Timmia.
