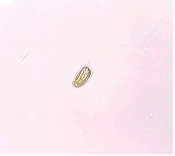
- Tetraselmis suecica

Scientific classification
- Domain: Eukaryota
- Supergroup: Archaeplastida
- Clade: Viridiplantae
- Division: Chlorophyta
- Class: Chlorodendrophyceae
- Order: Chlorodendrales
- Family: Chlorodendraceae; Oltmanns

Genera
- Halotetraselmis; Prasinocladus; Scherffelia; Tetraselmis

= Chlorodendraceae =

Family of algae

Chlorodendraceae is a family of green algae in the order Chlorodendrales.

Members of the family Chlorodendraceae are unicellular, free-living or endosymbiotic (Scherffelia and Tetraselmis), or colonial organisms attached to a substrate (Prasinocladus). Cells are usually flattened, bilaterally asymmetrical or symmetrical, and often twisted. The anterior apex has a small pit from which four equal flagella emerge. Cells contain one or two lobed chloroplasts, with or without pyrenoids. The nucleus is located in the center of the cell between the chloroplast lobes. An eyespot (stigma) is usually present. The cell wall (theca) is formed by fused scales; colonial forms have stalks formed from empty thecae.

Reproduction occurs asexually; sexual reproduction has not been observed. During asexual reproduction, the protoplast divides into two, four or eight daughter cells. Thick-walled cysts have also been observed in some species; these germinate into two or four zoospores.
