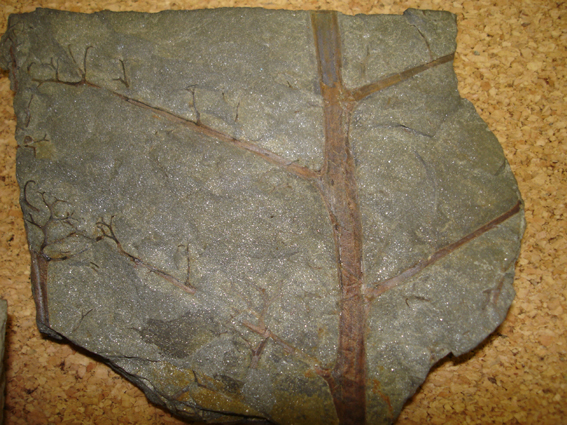
- Rhacophyton sp.

Scientific classification
- Kingdom: Plantae
- Division: Pteridophyta
- Order: †Rhacophytales

Genera
- †Chlidanophyton †Ellesmeris †Eocladoxylon †Protocephalopteris †Protopteridophyton †Rhacophyton

= Rhacophytales =

Rhacophytales Temporal range: Middle Devonian–Upper Devonian

Extinct order of ferns

Rhacophytales are an extinct group of plants from the Devonian period.

The representatives are characterized by a unique branching system in which bi- and quadriseriate units occur which are located in the axils of special structures, the aphlebiae. These are abnormal leaflets on the rhachis of ferns. The appendages of the last branching stage can be dichotomously branched, in some forms they stand in one plane. The vascular system consists of a clepsydroid primary xylem with a cross section and a secondary xylem. The sporangia are in groups and have no annulus. All representatives must have been homosporous.

The exact taxonomic position of Rhacophytales is still unclear. Rhacophyton was considered to be part of Aneurophytales (a progymnosperm order) in the past, when it was regarded as a precursor of seed ferns and true ferns. It was considered to be in Protopteridales, Zygopteridales, or the basal group in Coenopteridales, an polyphyletic group containing also Stauropteridales and Zygopteridales.

The representatives of the order share characteristics with some representatives of Iridopteridales and the progymnosperms. Some authors put them as a family in Zygopteridales, a fossil fern group. With them, they share glass-shaped xylem and quadriseriate branching. With the progymnosperms they share secondary xylem.

Taylor, Taylor and Krings (2009) see them as more evolved than Trimerophyta from which they originated, but they lack the organ differentiation found in the somewhat younger fern-like plants.
