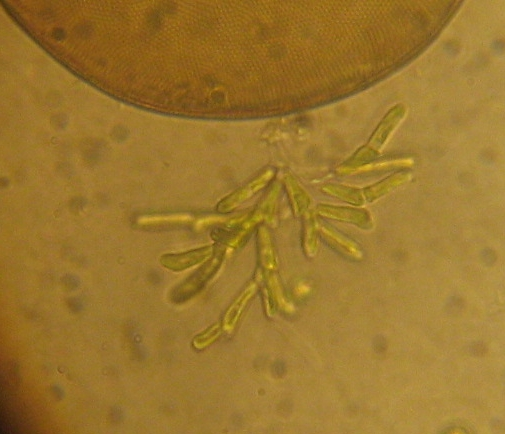
- Microthamnion sp.

Scientific classification
- Kingdom: Plantae
- Division: Chlorophyta
- Class: Trebouxiophyceae
- Order: Microthamniales; M.Melkonian
- Family: Microthamniaceae; G.S.West

Genera
- Coleochlamys; Microthamnion

= Microthamniaceae =

Family of algae

Microthamniaceae is a family of green algae in the class Trebouxiophyceae. It is the only family in the order Microthamniales.

Currently, there are two accepted genera within the family, Coleochlamys and Microthamnion. The two genera are sister to each other in molecular phylogenetic analyses, but share little in common morphologically. Microthamnion consists of branched filaments of cells, and is common worldwide in freshwater habitats. Meanwhile, Coleochlamys is an uncommon genus consisting of irregularly club-shaped cells, and is an uncommon, cold-tolerant alga of freshwater or terrestrial habitats.
