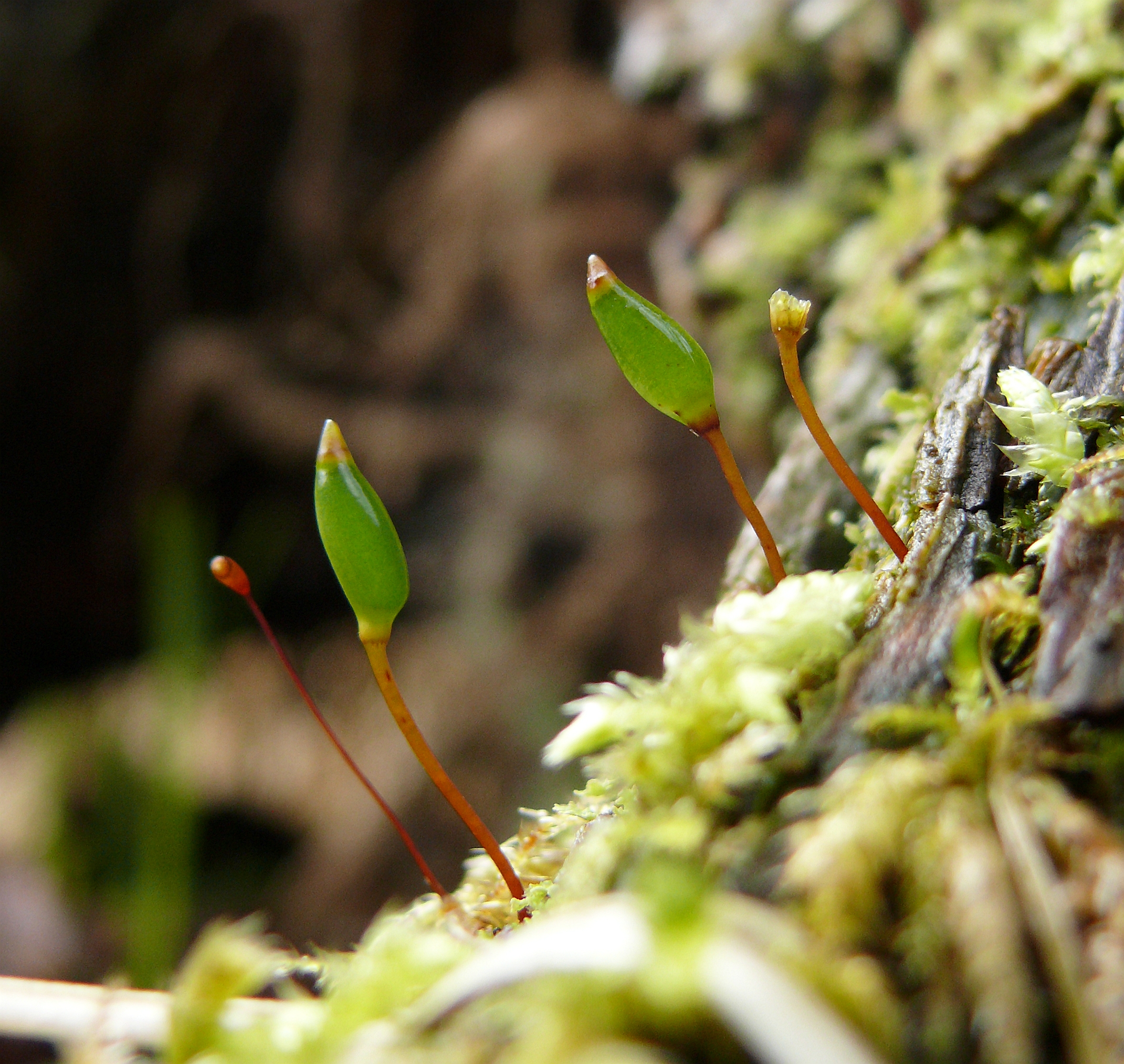
- Buxbaumia viridis

Scientific classification
- Kingdom: Plantae
- Division: Bryophyta
- Class: Bryopsida
- Subclass: Buxbaumiidae; Doweld
- Order: Buxbaumiales; M.Fleisch.
- Family: Buxbaumiaceae; Schimp.
- Genus: Buxbaumia; Hedw., 1801

Type species
- Buxbaumia aphylla Hedw.

Species
- See Classification

= Buxbaumia =

Genus of mosses

Buxbaumia (bug moss, bug-on-a-stick, humpbacked elves, or elf-cap moss) is a genus of twelve species of moss (Bryophyta). It was first named in 1742 by Albrecht von Haller and later brought into modern botanical nomenclature in 1801 by Johann Hedwig to commemorate Johann Christian Buxbaum, a German physician and botanist who discovered the moss in 1712 at the mouth of the Volga River. The moss is microscopic for most of its existence, and plants are noticeable only after they begin to produce their reproductive structures. The asymmetrical spore capsule has a distinctive shape and structure, some features of which appear to be transitional from those in primitive mosses to most modern mosses.

== Description ==
Plants of Buxbaumia have a much reduced gametophyte, bearing a sporophyte that is enormous by comparison. In most mosses, the gametophyte stage of the life cycle is both green and leafy, and is substantially larger than the spore-producing stage. Unlike these other mosses, the gametophyte of Buxbaumia is microscopic, colorless, stemless, and nearly leafless. It consists exclusively of thread-like protonemata for most of its existence, resembling a thin green-black felt on the surface where it grows. The plants are dioicous, with separate plants producing the male and female organs. Male plants develop only one microscopic leaf around each antheridium, and female plants produce just three or four tiny colorless leaves around each archegonium.

Because of its small size, the gametophyte stage is not generally noticed until the stalked sporangium develops, and is locatable principally because the sporangium grows upon and above the tiny gametophyte. The extremely reduced state of Buxbaumia plants raises the question of how it makes or obtains sufficient nutrition for survival. In contrast to most mosses, Buxbaumia does not produce abundant chlorophyll and is saprophytic. It is possible that some of its nutritional needs are met by fungi that grow within the plant. However, a recent study of the chloroplast genome in Buxbaumia failed to find any reduction in selective pressure on photosynthetic genes, suggesting that they are fully functional in photosynthesis, and that the moss is not mycoheterotrophic. This is also consistent with a lack of association between its rhizoids and nearby hyphae of soil fungi.

The sporophyte at maturity is between 4 and 11 mm tall. The spore capsule is attached at the top of the stalk and is distinctive, being asymmetric in shape and oblique in attachment. As with most other Bryopsida, the opening through which the spores are released is surrounded by a double peristome (diplolepidious) formed from the cell walls of disintegrated cells. The exostome (outer row) consists of 16 short articulated "teeth". Unlike most other mosses, the endostome (inner row) does not divide into teeth, but rather is a continuous pleated membrane around the capsule opening. Only the genus Diphyscium has a similar peristome structure, although that genus has only 16 pleats in its endostome, in contrast to the 32 pleats in Buxbaumia. Diphyscium shares with Buxbaumia one other oddity of the sporophyte; the foot (stalk base) ramifies as a result of outgrowths, so much so that they may be mistaken for rhizoids.

== Distribution and ecology ==
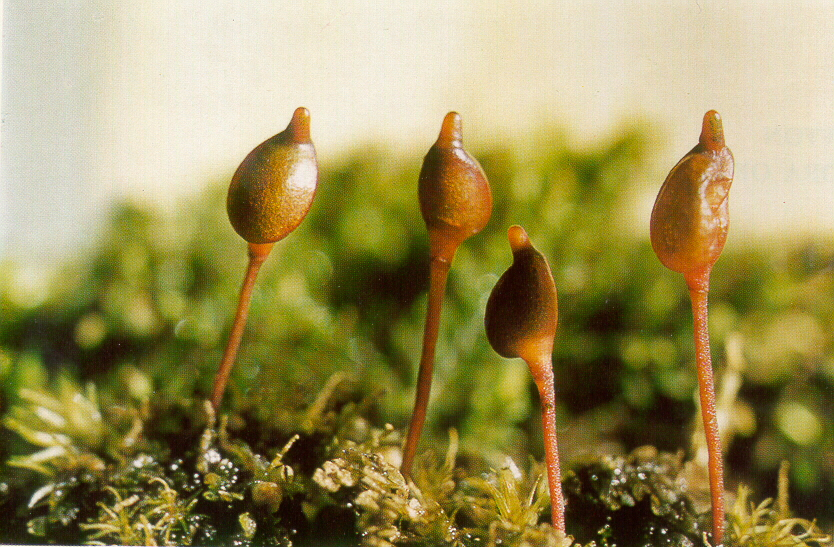
Sporophytes of Buxbaumia aphylla growing among other mosses. None of the visible leaves belong to Buxbaumia, which is a stemless and nearly leafless plant.

Species of Buxbaumia may be found across much of the temperate to subarctic regions of the Northern Hemisphere, as well as cooler regions of Australia and New Zealand.

The moss is an annual or biennial plant and grows in disturbed habitats or as a pioneer species. The plants grow on decaying wood, rock outcrops, or directly on the soil. They do not grow regularly or reliably at given locations, and frequently disappear from places where they have previously been found. Sporophyte stages begin their development in the autumn, and are green through the winter months. Spores are mature and ready for dispersal by the late spring or early summer. The spores are ejected from the capsule in puffs when raindrops fall upon the capsule's flattened top.

The asymmetric sporophytes of Buxbaumia aphylla develop so that the opening is oriented towards the strongest source of light, usually towards the south. The species often grows together with the diminutive liverwort Cephaloziella, which forms a blackish crust that is easier to spot than Buxbaumia itself.

== Classification ==
Buxbaumia is the only genus in the family Buxbaumiaceae, the order Buxbaumiales, and the subclass Buxbaumiidae. It is the sister group to all other members of class Bryopsida. Some older classifications included the Diphysciaceae within the Buxbaumiales (or as part of the Buxbaumiaceae) because of similarities in the peristome structure, or placed the Buxbaumiaceae in the Tetraphidales. However, recent phylogenetic studies based on genomic and transcriptomic data clearly support it as the sister group of all other Bryopsida.

The genus Buxbaumia includes twelve species:

genus Buxbaumia

Buxbaumia aphylla
Buxbaumia colyerae
Buxbaumia himalayensis
Buxbaumia javanica
Buxbaumia minakatae
Buxbaumia novae-zelandiae
Buxbaumia piperi
Buxbaumia punctata
Buxbaumia symmetrica
Buxbaumia tasmanica
Buxbaumia thorsborneae
Buxbaumia viridis

- - Oedipodiopsida
  - - - Tetraphidopsida
      - Polytrichopsida
      - Bryopsida
        - Buxbaumia
        - - Diphysciidae
          - - Timmiidae
            - Funariidae
            - Dicranidae
            - Bryidae

The species and phylogenetic position of Buxbaumia.

Because of the simplicity of its structure, Goebel interpreted Buxbaumia as a primitive moss, transitional between the algae and mosses, but subsequent research suggests that it is a secondarily reduced form. The unusual peristome in Buxbaumia is now thought to be a transitional form between the nematodontous (cellular teeth) peristome of the Polytrichopsida and the arthrodontous (cell wall teeth) peristome of the Bryopsida.
