= Stauropteridaceae =

Stauropteridaceae Temporal range: Devonian–Upper Carboniferous

Scientific classification
- Kingdom: Plantae
- Clade: Embryophytes
- Clade: Tracheophytes
- Division: Pteridophyta
- Order: †Stauropteridales
- Family: †Stauropteridaceae

Genera
- †Stauropteris †Gillespiea †Rowleya

Extinct family of ferns

Stauropteridaceae is a family of ferns or fern-like plants from the Devonian and Upper Carboniferous. It is the only family placed in the order Stauropteridales. Some, like Stauropteris oldhamia, were homosporous, and others, like S. berwickensis and Gillespiea randolphensis, were heterosporous.
