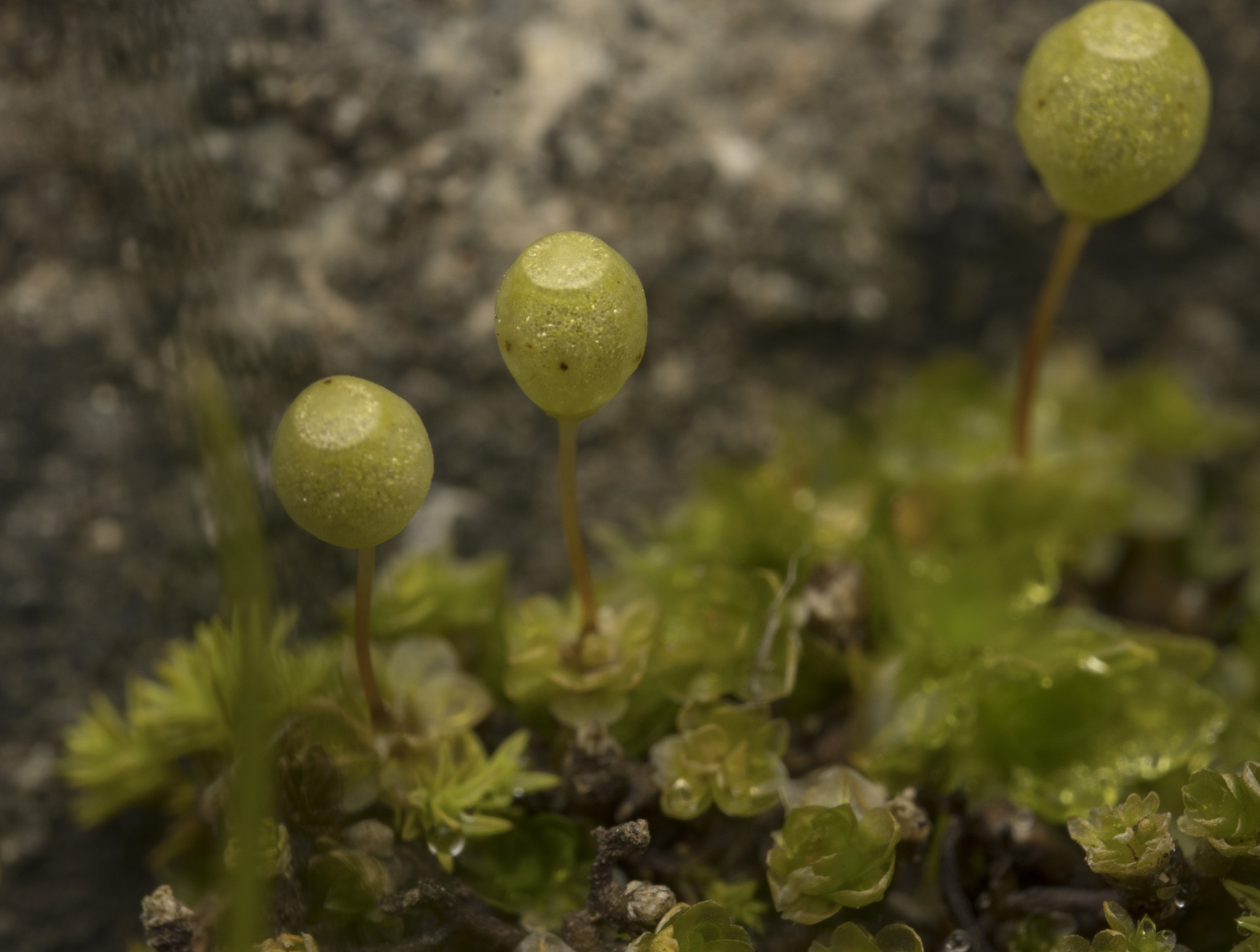
- Costesia macrocarpa in Maipo, Chile

Scientific classification
- Kingdom: Plantae
- Division: Bryophyta
- Class: Bryopsida
- Subclass: Gigaspermidae
- Order: Gigaspermales; Goffinet, Wickett, O. Werner, Ros, A.J. Shaw & C.J. Cox
- Family: Gigaspermaceae; Lindb.

Genera
- Chamaebryum; Costesia; Gigaspermum; Lorentziella; Oedipodiella

= Gigaspermaceae =

Family of mosses

Gigaspermaceae are a family of mosses in the monotypic order Gigaspermales. The order is placed in subclass Gigaspermidae of the class Bryopsida. They were previously placed in subclass Funariidae.
