= Sycidiales =

Sycidiales Temporal range: Silurian–Carboniferous

Scientific classification
- Domain: Eukaryota
- Clade: Archaeplastida
- Clade: Viridiplantae
- Division: Charophyta
- Class: Charophyceae
- Order: †Sycidiales

Families
- See text.

Extinct order of algae

Sycidiales is an order of fossil charophyte green algae. The reproductive structures in Sycidales have a calcified cover, called a utricle, that is thought to prevent the zygote being desiccated. Other Paleozoic families lack this cover, as do modern charophytes. Fossils of the family Sycidiaceae are found over the longest time span, from the Silurian to the Carboniferous.

== Families and genera ==
As of February 2022, AlgaeBase accepted the following families and genera.

- †Chovanellaceae
  - †Chovanella Reitlinger & Yartseva – 1 species
- †Sycidiaceae Karpinsky
  - †Calcisphaera Williamson – 4 species
  - †Gemmichara Zhen Wang – 1 species
  - †Maslovella Samojlova – 1 species
  - †Sycidium G.Sandberger – 12 species
