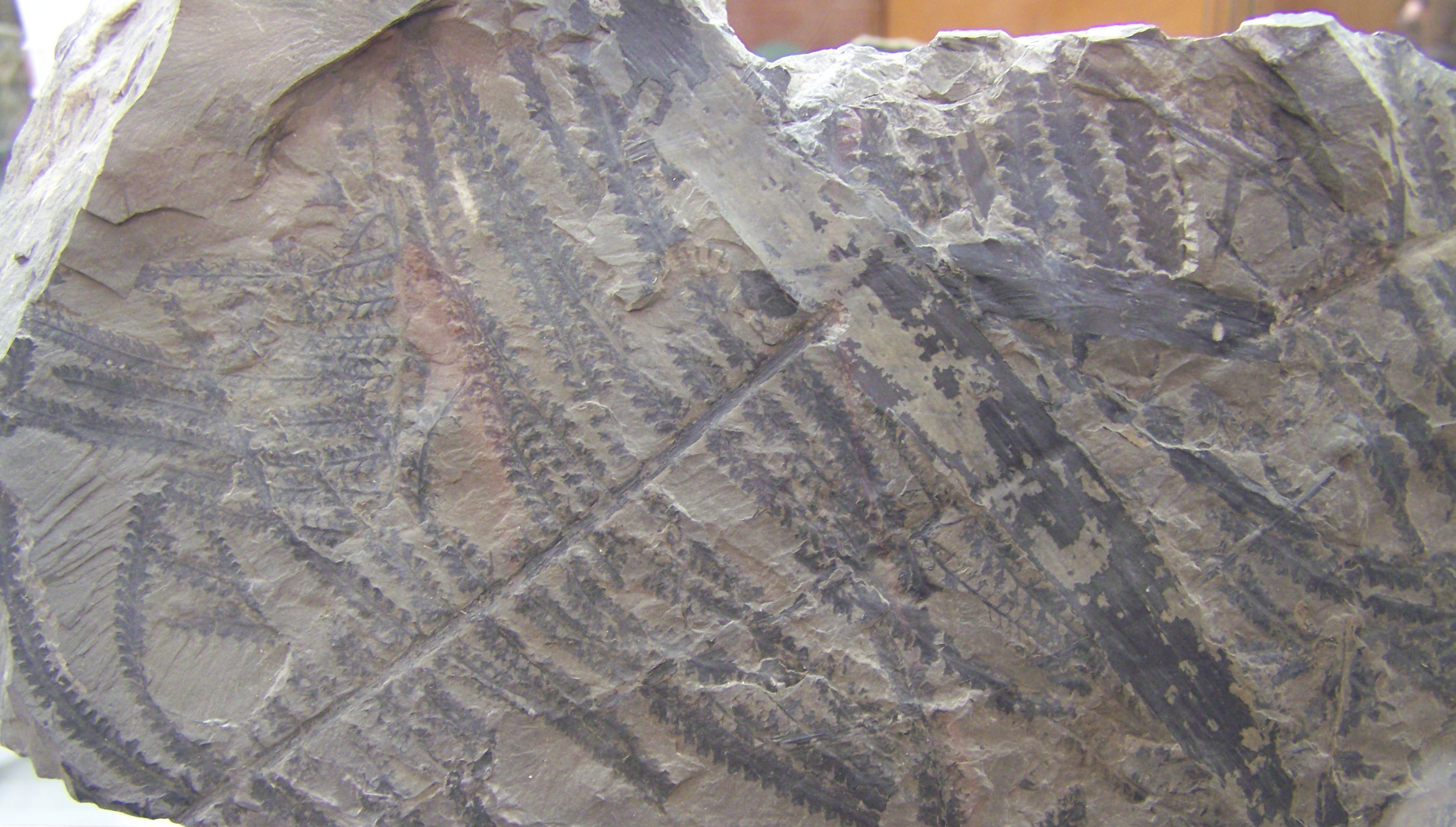
- Alloiopteris erosa

Scientific classification
- Kingdom: Plantae
- Clade: Tracheophytes
- Division: Polypodiophyta
- Class: Polypodiopsida
- Subclass: Marattiidae
- Order: †Zygopteridales

Families
- †Teledeaceae †Zygopteridaceae

= Zygopteridales =

Zygopteridales Temporal range: Middle Devonian–Early Cretaceous

Extinct order of ferns

Zygopteridales is an extinct order of ferns or fern-like plants which grew primarily during the Carboniferous. It comprises two families: Zygopteridaceae, which contains at least a dozen named genera, and Teledeaceae, which comprises two genera (Teledea and Senftenbergia). A few other genera are of uncertain placement and are not assigned to any family yet.
