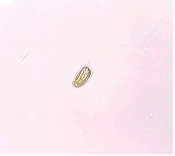
- Tetraselmis suecica

Scientific classification
- Kingdom: Plantae
- Division: Chlorophyta
- Class: Chlorodendrophyceae; Massjuk
- Order: Chlorodendrales; Melkonian

Families
- Chlorodendraceae; †Pterosphaeridiaceae

= Chlorodendrales =

Order of algae

Chlorodendrales are an order of green, flagellated, thecate eukaryotes, within the green algae class Chlorodendrophyceae. Prasinophyceae are defined by their cellular scales which are composed of carbohydrates, and Chlorodendrales are unique within this group due to these scales forming a fused thecal wall. Cells of Chlorodendrales are completely covered in scales, which fuse around the cell body producing the theca, but remain individually separated on the flagella, of which there are typically four per cell. Species within Chlorodendrales live in both marine and fresh water habitats, occupying both benthic and planktonic food webs. Additionally, they are photoautotrophs, meaning they produce their own food through the conversion of sunlight into chemical energy.

== Habitat and ecology ==
Species within Chlorodendrales are found in marine and freshwater ecosystems around the world, including locations such as the salt plains of Goa, India. Species occupy niches within planktonic and benthic food webs, in which all species are photoautotrophic and have an ecosystem and trophic role similar to land plants in terrestrial environments. Primary producers are consumed by primary consumers such as zooplankton, invertebrate larvae, and heterotrophic protists species. Most species within this group are free-living, however some species have become photosynthetic symbionts in animals; the animal species that can be in symbiosis with Chlorodendrales is limited, due to their need for sunlight for photosynthetic processes. Chlorodendrales populations in natural settings tend to experience extreme fluctuations in population numbers due to seasonal changes in abiotic conditions, such as ambient temperature, the amount of sunlight, and nutrient concentrations. This leads to what has been classified as "blooms," which is the rapid increase in algae numbers during the spring and autumn months because of high light activity and the turnover of nutrients within the water column. It results from the high amount of sunlight, and the mixing of the water layers which resupplies the upper photosynthetic layer with nutrients, allowing for primary productivity to flourish.

== Morphology ==
Cell shape and size of Chlorodendrales cells varies depending on the species. The cells range greatly in size from species to species, with an upper limit of ~25 μm in length. Cells can be round, ovoid, elliptical, flattened, or compressed; there is great diversity in Chlorodendrales cells.

=== Flagellar and cell-body scales ===
Chlorodendrales scales are unique from other Prasinophyceae lineages because the scales fuse to form a theca, which acts as an exterior protective casing for the cell. All Prasinophyceae lineages produce these external scales within the Golgi apparatus, and secrete the scales via the endomembrane system. Vesicles budding from the trans-Golgi face carry the scales to the cell surface, and upon fusion release the scales to the external cell face. In Chlorodendrales lineages, these scales fuse after secretion to produce the thecal wall, in which individual scales bind by cross-linking to one another.

The flagellar scales and the cell body scales are structurally and functionally different, the main difference being the fusion of cell-body scales. The scales also differ in size, shape, and macromolecular composition. The Golgi apparatus is only capable of producing one scale-type at a time, thus, species with multiple scale-types must have different phases of thecal development separated by time and space. This also means that cell body and flagellar scale production occurs separately.

=== Scales used for taxonomic purposes and species identification ===
The thecae of Chlorodendrales species are often unique, and it is an important character for species identification and classification. Thecate features vary greatly from species to species, in which thecae can vary between 1-5 scale layers, in scale shape, in scale size, and in molecular composition/ultrastructure. These thecate features are genetically determined, and thus, they are a consistent and reliable characteristic that will not be influenced by environmental factors.

=== Genera within Chlorodendrales ===
There are three genera within the order Chlorodendrales, Tetraselmis, Scherffelia, and Prasinocladus. Tetraselmis and Scherffelia are unicellular, free-swimming organisms, while Prasinocladus forms colonies of cells attached to surfaces via branched stalks.

Tetraselmis and Scherffelia differ in the presence/absence of pyrenoids; Tetraselmis contains pyrenoids and Scherffelia does not. Flagella within the genera are distinct in composition and morphology from species to species, which can be used to infer taxonomy and identification. Both Tetraselmis and Scherffelia produce three types of flagellar scales, in scale combination, and scale patterning, is unique between species. Scales differ mainly in composition and ultrastructure, and these are the main features examined from flagellar scales when identifying species. The increase in knowledge about the morphological and ultrastructural features of flagellar scales, and the ability to identify species as a result, has been due to the development of advanced microscopy and staining techniques.

== Phylogenetic studies ==
Researchers have collected and analyzed molecular data from 13 prasinophyte taxa to better construct the phylogenetic relationship of early branching green alga. Phylogenetic analysis of the small subunit ribosomal-RNA sequence was performed using distance, parsimony, and likelihood statistical tests. The analyses showed four independent prasinophyte groups, in which these lineages represented the earliest divergences among the Chlorophyta. The most parsimonious tree created suggests that the Chlorodendrales lineage is a very early diverging group of "core Chlorophytes," of which there are four clades. However, the diverging order of this group remains unclear.
