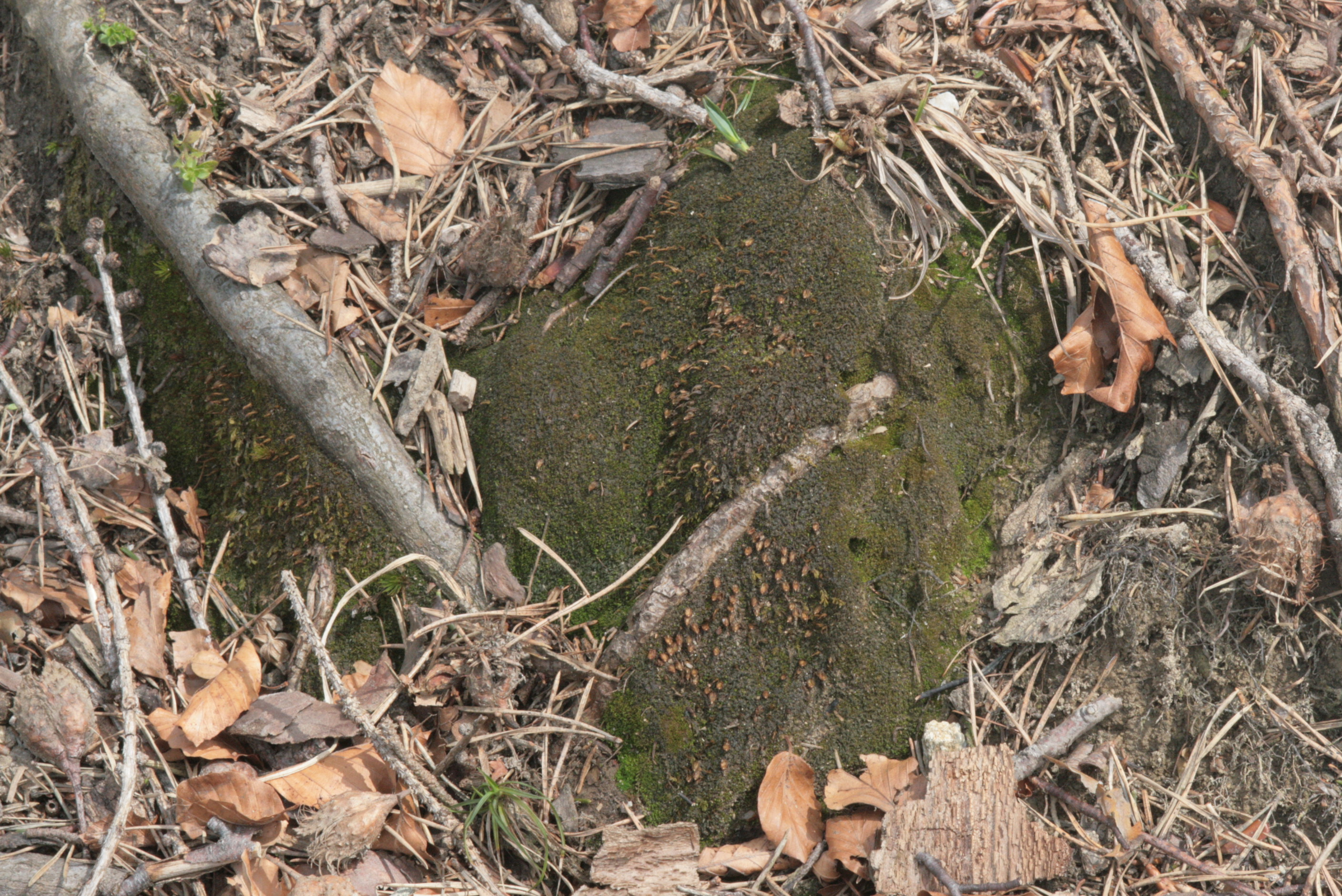
- Diphyscium foliosum

Scientific classification
- Kingdom: Plantae
- Division: Bryophyta
- Class: Bryopsida
- Subclass: Diphysciidae; Ochyra
- Order: Diphysciales; M. Fleisch.
- Family: Diphysciaceae; M. Fleisch.
- Genus: Diphyscium; D. Mohr

Species
- See text

= Diphyscium =

Genus of mosses

Diphyscium is a genus of mosses in the family Diphysciaceae. Members of this genus are small, perennial plants. The capsule does not elongate much, and remains buried among surrounding leaves.

There are fifteen species of Diphyscium. However, two of these species formerly were placed in the southeast Asian genus Theriotia, and one species, from Chile, formerly was segregated in the monotypic genus Muscoflorschuetzia. In 2003, Magombo proposed reclassifying all fifteen species as belonging to the single genus Diphyscium.
