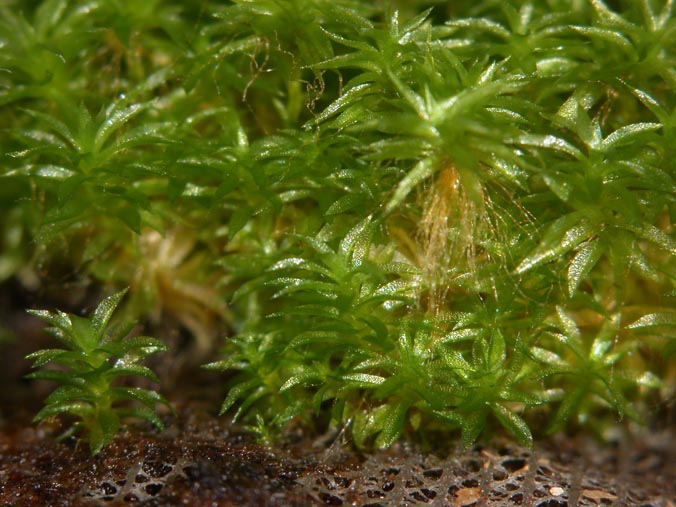
- Physcomitrella patens

Scientific classification
- Kingdom: Plantae
- Division: Bryophyta
- Class: Bryopsida
- Subclass: Funariidae
- Order: Funariales
- Family: Funariaceae
- Genus: Physcomitrella

Species
- Physcomitrella patens Physcomitrella readeri

= Physcomitrella =

Genus of mosses

Physcomitrella is a genus of mosses, containing two species. Physcomitrella patens is a model organism in laboratory research. Physcomitrella readeri is fairly similar, distinguished only by subtle characteristics. In fact, it has often been debated whether they should rightly be considered separate species, or a single species.

Physcomitrella has been used as a model organism. It diverged from the flowering plants over 400 million years ago, so the difference between the groups indicates the changes in the genome that accompanied the adaptation of plants to living on land.
