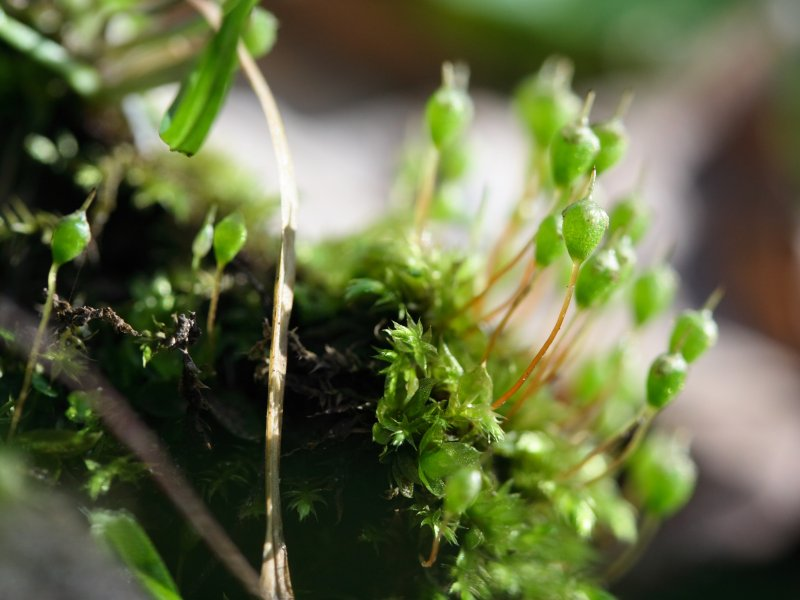

Scientific classification
- Kingdom: Plantae
- Division: Bryophyta
- Class: Bryopsida
- Subclass: Funariidae
- Order: Funariales
- Family: Funariaceae
- Genus: Physcomitrium
- Species: P. pyriforme

Binomial name
- Physcomitrium pyriforme Hedw.

= Physcomitrium pyriforme =

Common bladder-moss

Species of moss

Physcomitrium pyriforme, commonly known as common bladder-moss, is a bryophyte native to all continents except South America and Antarctica. Its capsules mature beginning in late fall and through the spring. It is most commonly found in wet soils in disturbed locations. A highly variable species, size, leaf characters and shape of the capsule vary across its range, but often within populations as well.
