= Bryobrittonia =

Scientific classification
- Kingdom: Plantae
- Division: Bryophyta
- Class: Bryopsida
- Subclass: Funariidae
- Order: Encalyptales
- Family: Encalyptaceae
- Genus: Bryobrittonia; R. S. Williams
- Species: B. longipes

Binomial name
- Bryobrittonia longipes (Mitten) D.G.Horton

Genus of mosses

Bryobrittonia is a genus of moss in the family Encalyptaceae; it contains the single species Bryobrittonia longipes. This species grows on calcareous soil in cooler climates of North America, Europe, and central Asia.

The genus is named in honor of Elizabeth Gertrude Britton, a founder of the Wild Flower Preservation Society of America.
