= Pyramidula =

Pyramidula tetragona

Scientific classification
- Kingdom: Plantae
- Division: Bryophyta
- Class: Bryopsida
- Subclass: Funariidae
- Order: Funariales
- Family: Funariaceae
- Genus: Pyramidula; Bridel
- Species: P. tetragona

Binomial name
- Pyramidula tetragona (Bridel) Bridel

Synonyms
- Gymnostomum tetragonum Bridel

Genus of mosses

Pyramidula is a genus of moss in the family Funariaceae. It contains the single species Pyramidula tetragona distributed in central North America as well as Europe and Africa. Pyramid moss is a common name.
