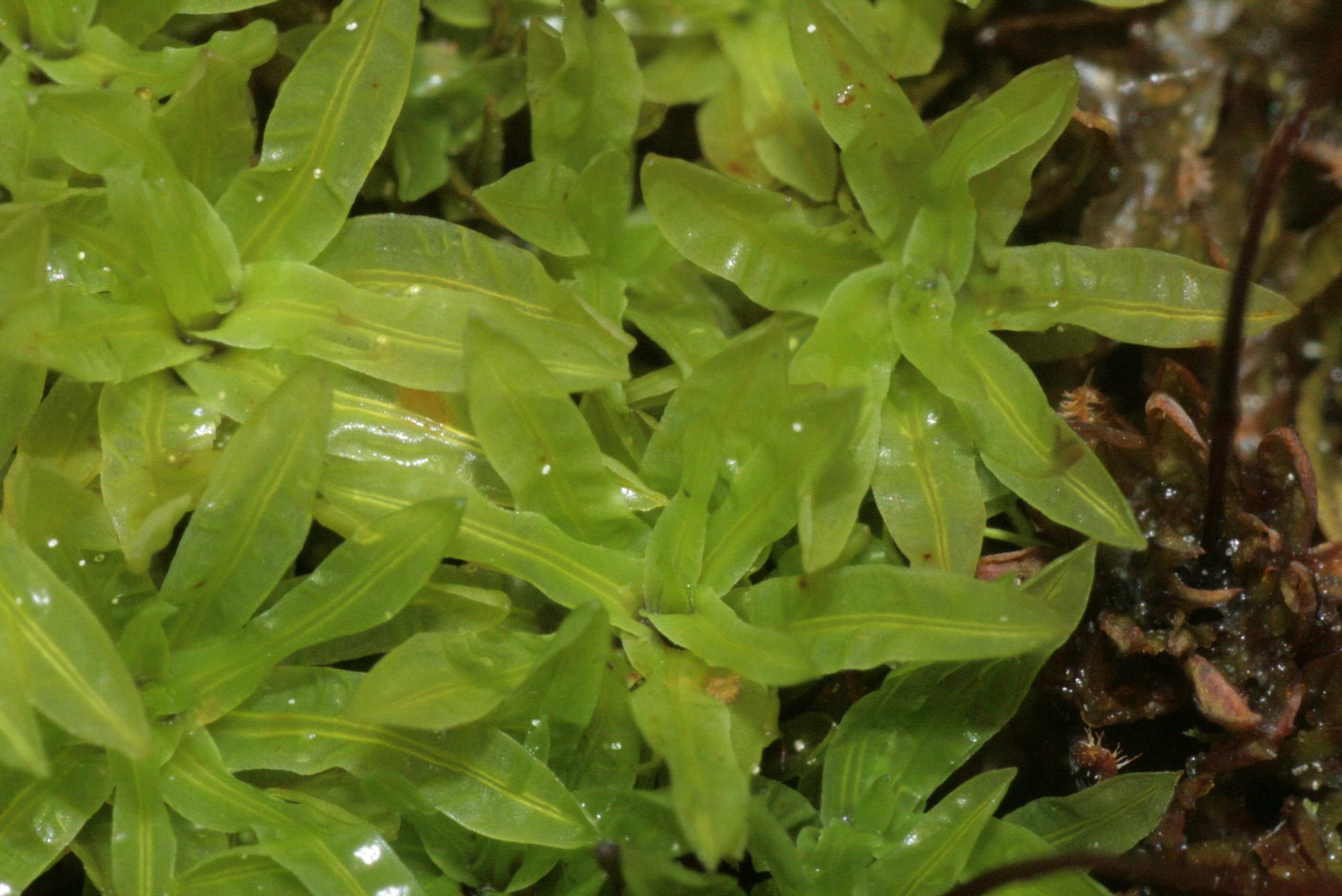

Scientific classification
- Kingdom: Plantae
- Clade: Embryophytes
- Division: Bryophyta
- Class: Bryopsida
- Order: Encalyptales
- Family: Encalyptaceae
- Genus: Encalypta
- Species: E. streptocarpa

Binomial name
- Encalypta streptocarpa Hedw.

= Encalypta streptocarpa =

Species of moss

Encalypta streptocarpa, the spiral extinguisher-moss, is a species of moss.

== Morphology ==
The broad, dull green leaves are unique in the genus for the nerve does not reach the leaf tip. E. streptocarpa often lacks capsules. Calyptra are large and distinguish the moss from members of the Pottiales, otherwise similar, such as Tortula subulata.

== Reproduction ==
Encalypta streptocarpa is notable in rarely producing spores; instead it disperses by gemmae, visible as small orange bright grows in the moss.

== Habitat ==
This species is a calcicole, most easily found on limestone and calcareous rocks. However it can grow on several different substrates, such as sandstone, igneous rocks, chalk soil to beech roots in woods. Artificial environments include mortar and limestone surfaces, especially crumbling ones. It prefers good lighting rather than deep shade and it is found from sea level up to 650 meters.

== Distribution ==
Widespread in Europe, including Iceland and Scandinavia. It is found eastward up to the Ural Mountains. It has been reported also from the Canary Islands, Turkey, Syria, Morocco, Caucasus and Iran.
