= Physcomitrium readeri =

Conservation status
- Vulnerable (IUCN 3.1)

- Apparently Secure (NatureServe)

Scientific classification
- Kingdom: Plantae
- Division: Bryophyta
- Class: Bryopsida
- Order: Funariales
- Family: Funariaceae
- Genus: Physcomitrium
- Species: P. readeri

Binomial name
- Physcomitrium readeri Müll.Hall.

Synonyms
- Ephemerella readeri (Müll. Hal.) Müll. Hal.; Physcomitrella patens subsp. readeri (Müll. Hal.) B.C. Tan; Physcomitrella readeri (Müll. Hal.) I.G. Stone & G.A.M. Scott; Physcomitridium readeri (Müll. Hal.) G. Roth; Physcomitrium readeri (Müll.Hal.) R.Medina & Goffinet; Physcomitrella austropatens Broth. ex G. Roth; Physcomitrella californica H.A. Crum & L.E. Anderson; Physcomitrella patens subsp. californica (H.A. Crum & L.E. Anderson) B.C. Tan

Species of plant

Physcomitrium readeri is a moss and a bryophyte.

== Distribution and ecology ==
The known range of Physcomitrium raederi covers California, Australia, New Zealand and Japan. It was only recently discovered to occur in the UK, however it is unknown if this species is native to the UK, where it was discovered in multiple reservoirs. It occurs in mudflats and along the banks of rivers, lakes and other bodies of water.

== Lifecycle ==
Its capsules mature Jan-Apr.

== Characteristics ==
The plants are minute to small, gregarious and dark green, attaining total heights up to 4.5 mm. The stems are red-brown, beset near the base with smooth, red-brown rhizoids and measure up to 3.0 mm in length, exhibiting branching predominantly near the basal region. Leaves measure up to 2.0 mm in length and 0.6 mm in width, with an ovate-lanceolate outline and an acuminate apex. They are incurved around the capsule when dry, spreading when moist. The leaf margins are plane throughout, becoming serrulate exclusively within the distal third and features no auxiliary hairs. The costa is single and moderately developed, extending 1/2 to 2/3 of the total leaf length; occasionally, it appears slightly forked at the apex

- Proximal (basal) cells: Large and rectangular to rhomboidal, measuring 75–180 µm in length and 35–60 µm in width
- Distal (upper) cells: shorter and narrower, measuring 45–115 µm in length and 15–50 µm in width
- Marginal cells: undifferentiated, forming no distinct limbidium or differentiated border along the margins.

The calyptra are smooth and entire at the base, frequently exhibiting a single lateral slit that extends toward the apex (in a cucullate-type slit development); the spores are spherical to sub-spherical, measuring 27–42 µm in diameter.

Its shorter and sometimes forked costa, rostrum size as well as in some cases geographical separation are key indicators of differentiation to P. patens.
