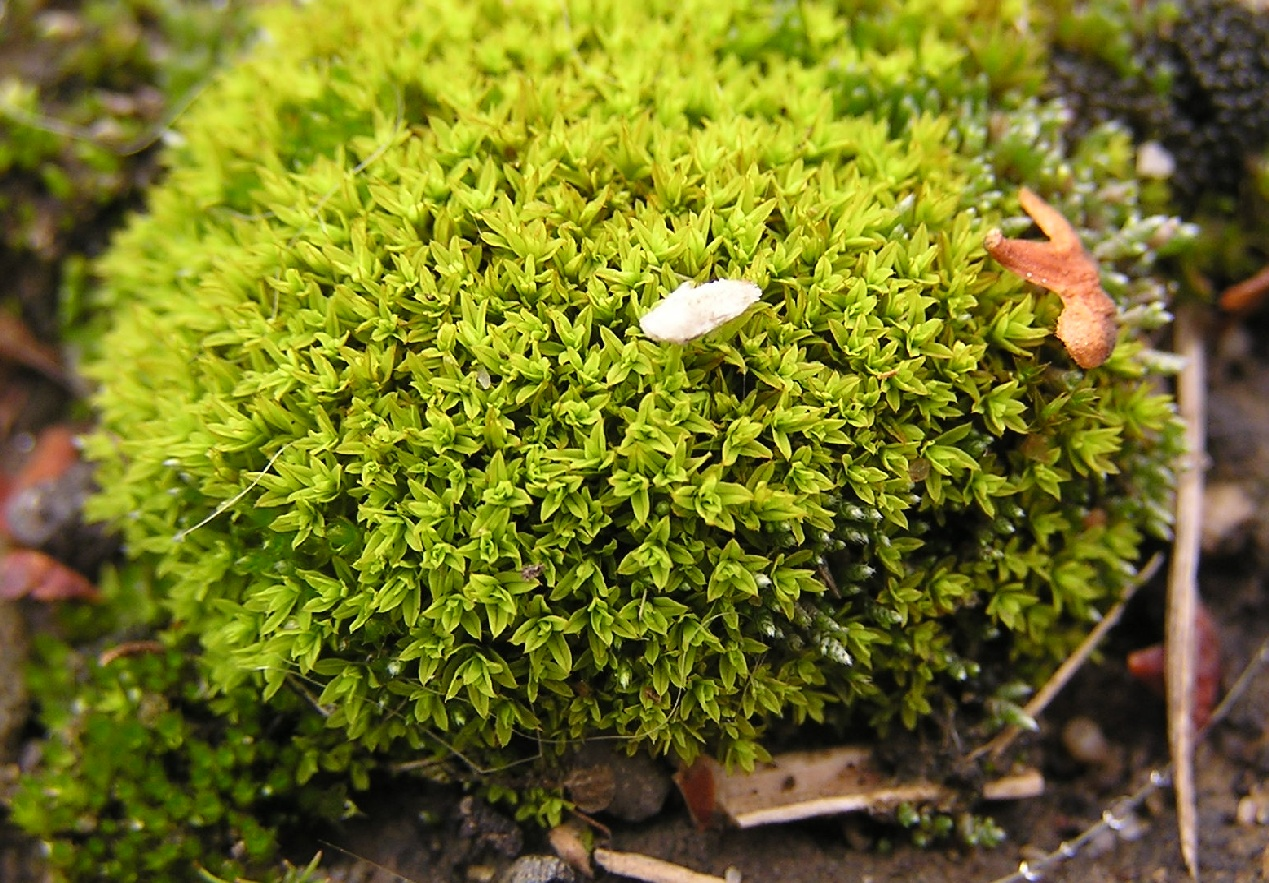
- Encalypta vulgaris

Scientific classification
- Kingdom: Plantae
- Division: Bryophyta
- Class: Bryopsida
- Order: Encalyptales
- Family: Encalyptaceae
- Genus: Encalypta; Hedw.

Species
- Encalypta alpina Encalypta brevicollis Encalypta ciliata Encalypta rhaptocarpa Encalypta streptocarpa Encalypta vulgaris

= Encalypta =

Genus of mosses

Encalypta is a genus of moss in the family Encalyptaceae; commonly known as "extinguisher moss". It includes 34 species and is broadly distributed across the continents of America, Europe, Asia, Africa and Australia, as well as Madagascar and New Zealand. The name is derived from the Greek en, meaning in, and kalyptos, which means to cover, veil or lid.
