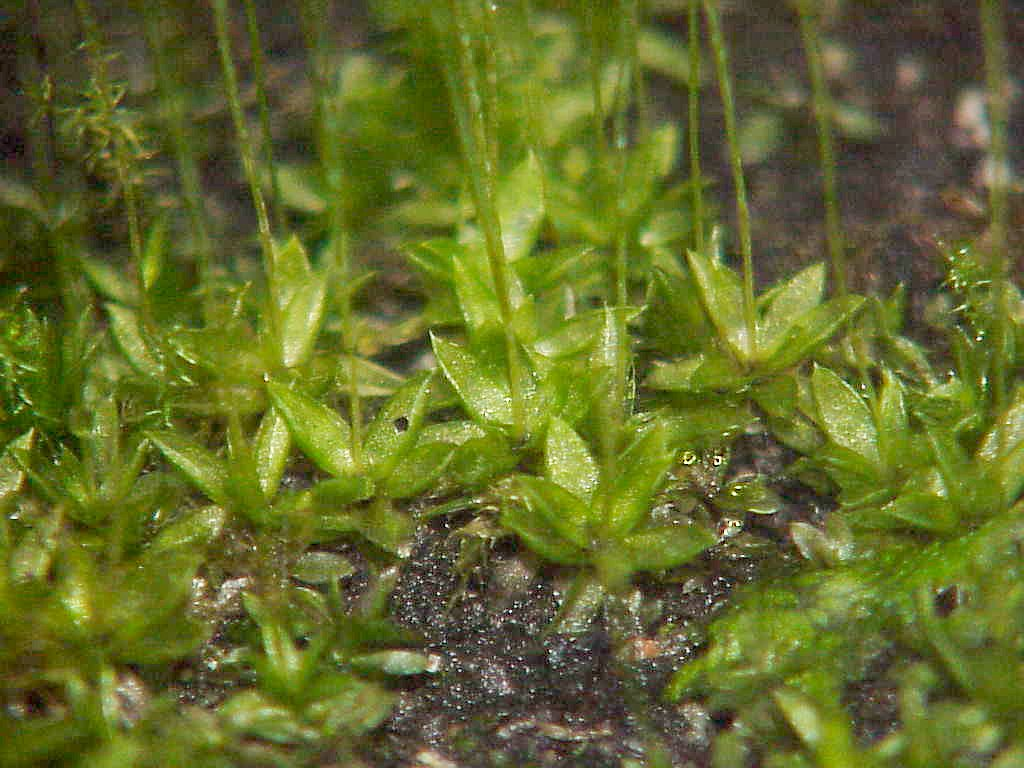

Scientific classification
- Kingdom: Plantae
- Division: Bryophyta
- Class: Bryopsida
- Subclass: Funariidae
- Order: Funariales
- Family: Funariaceae
- Genus: Funaria
- Species: F. hygrometrica

Binomial name
- Funaria hygrometrica Hedw.

= Funaria hygrometrica =

Species of moss

Funaria hygrometrica, the bonfire moss or common cord-moss, is a type of water moss which grows on shady, moist soil. It can also be found on moist walls and the crevices of rocks and places where recent fires have taken place. It has been reported to grow in Niagara Cave, an artificially illuminated cave devoid of natural light. Under such conditions, its growth form changes so that the internodes lengthen and the leaves become longer and narrower.

The plant body is green, soft and upright, about half an inch tall. The rhizoids present in this species are multi-cellular and branched. They have oblique septa. The main axis of the plant, which is upright, bears a set of spirally arranged, sessile leaves having a clearly distinguishable midrib.

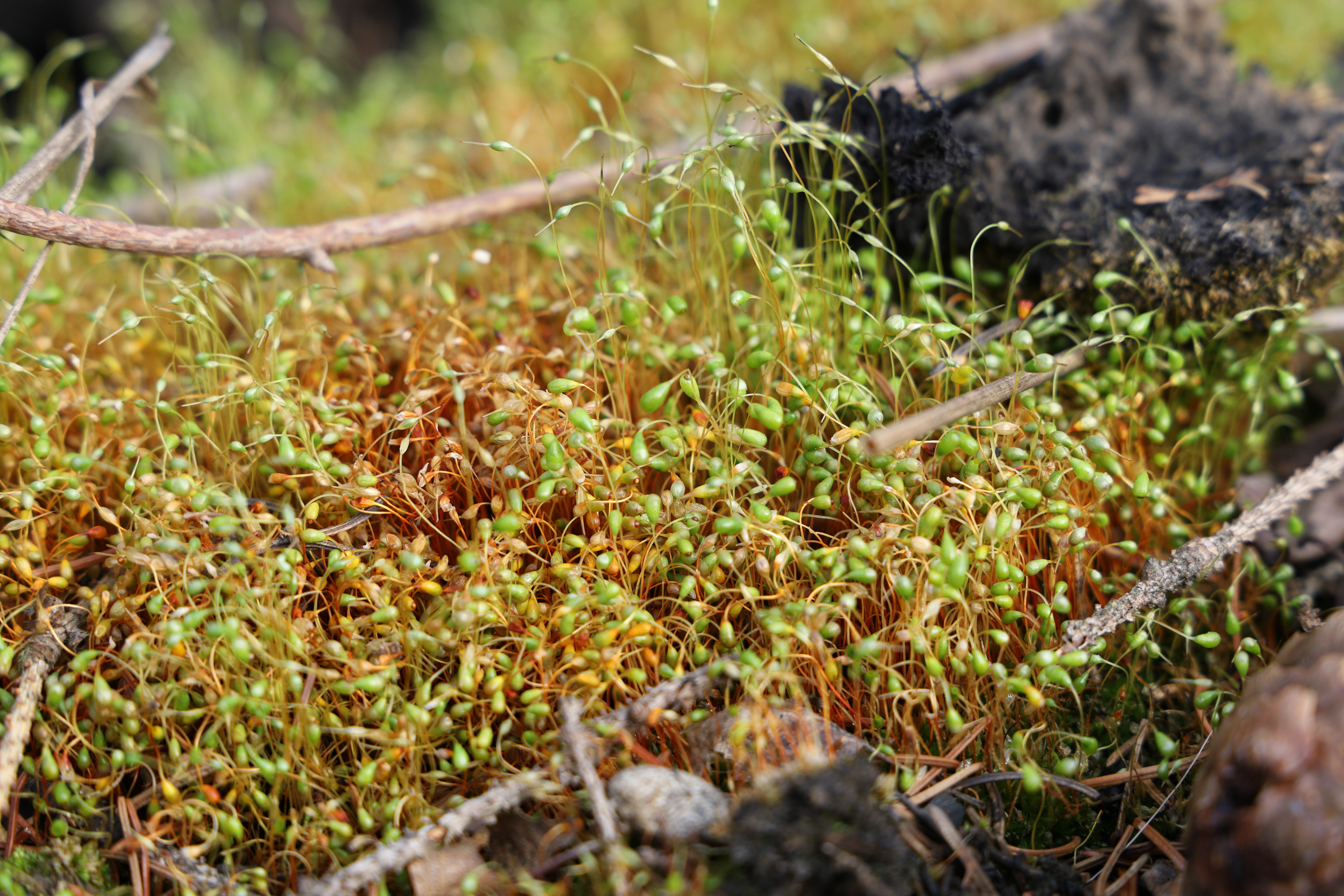
Sporophyte of Funaria

At the apex of the main plant axis, the antheridium is borne. This is the male part of the shoot. A lateral branch from the main plant axis bears the female shoot archegonium at its meristem. Experiments have shown that F. hygrometrica can withstand water with 90% heavy water.
