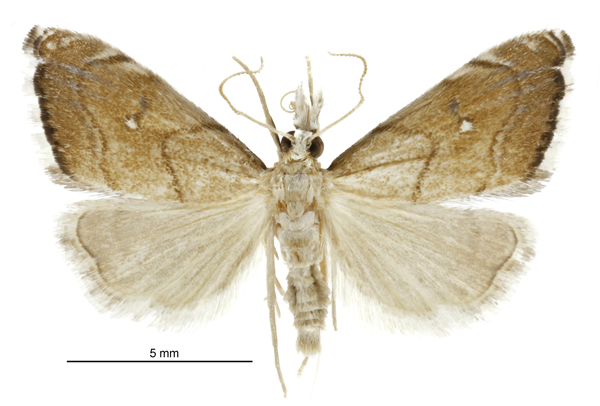
- Male

Scientific classification
- Kingdom: Animalia
- Phylum: Arthropoda
- Clade: Pancrustacea
- Class: Insecta
- Order: Lepidoptera
- Family: Crambidae
- Subfamily: Crambinae
- Tribe: Diptychophorini
- Genus: Glaucocharis
- Species: G. bipunctella

Binomial name
- Glaucocharis bipunctella (Walker, 1866)

Synonyms
- Eromene bipunctella Walker, 1866; Diptychophora bipunctella (Walker, 1866); Pareromene bipunctella (Walker, 1866)

= Glaucocharis bipunctella =

Species of moth

Glaucocharis bipunctella is a moth in the family Crambidae. It was described by Francis Walker in 1866. This species is endemic to New Zealand and has been found in the Auckland region, in the southern parts of the North Island and in the Nelson region. It inhabits dense native forest. Larvae of this species have been raised on liverworts. Adults are on the wing in November to January and are attracted to light.

== Taxonomy ==
This species was first described by Francis Walker in 1866 and named Eromene bipunctella. In 1885 Edward Meyrick placed this species in the genus Diptychophora. George Hudson discussed this species under this name in his 1928 book The butterflies and moths of New Zealand but when illustrating the species used a specimen from the species Glaucocharis harmonica. In 1929 Alfred Philpott supposedly described the genitalia of the male of this species. However Gaskin stated that Philpott's illustrations labelled bipunctella were actually of G. elaina. Hudson, in his 1939 book A supplement to the butterflies and moths of New Zealand, corrected this error, illustrated G. bipunctella and discussed it in more detail. In 1971 David E. Gaskin placed this species in the genus Pareromene. In 1985 Gaskin again discussed this species and placed it in the genus Glaucocharis. The male holotype, collected in Auckland by D. Bolton, is held at the Natural History Museum, London.

== Description ==
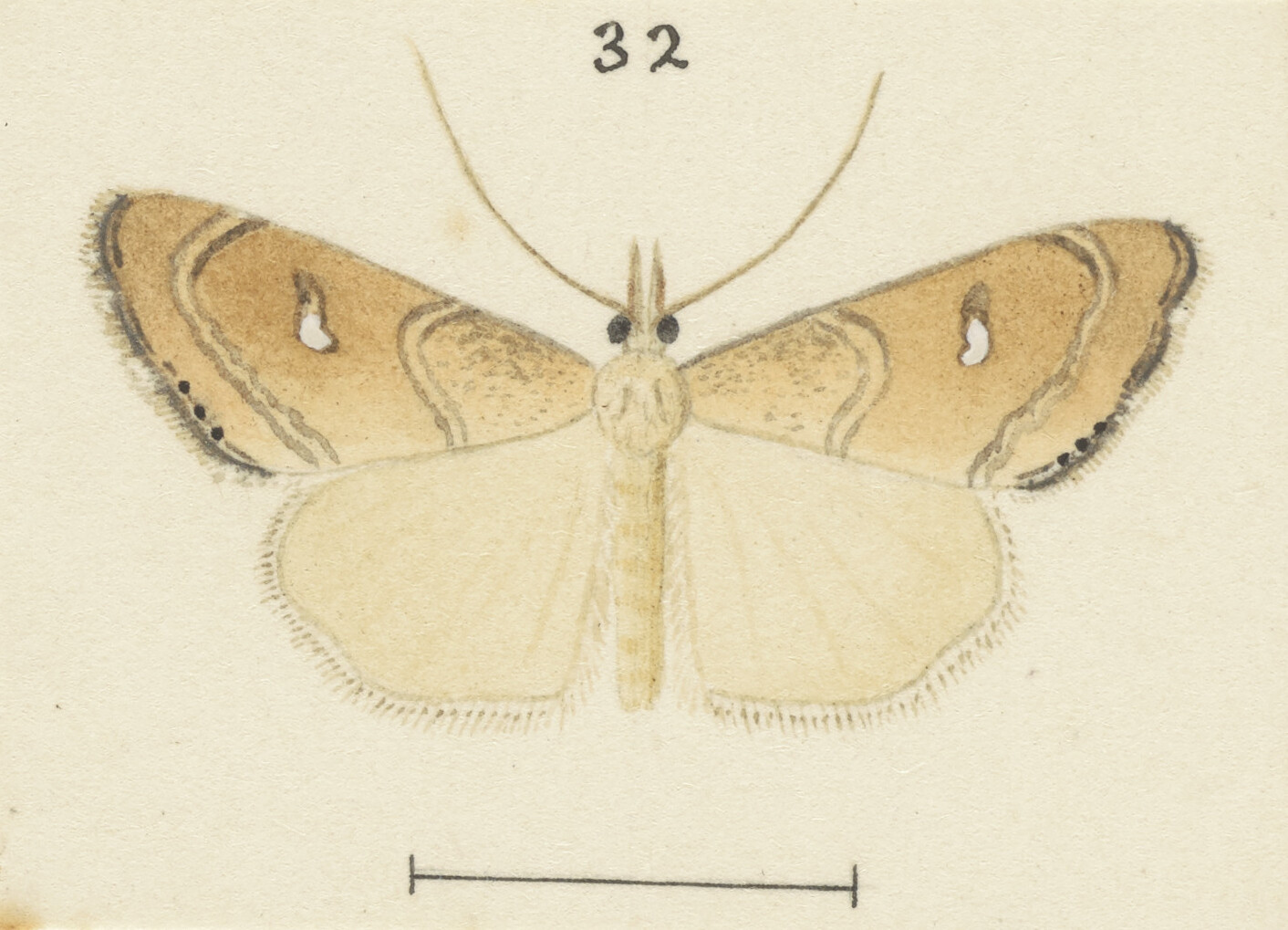
Illustration of male.

Hudson described this species as follows:

The expansion of the wings is nearly 5/8 inch (15 mm.). The fore-wings are triangular, termen oblique, brownish-cream-colour, with pale grey, but very distinct markings; first-line double, from about 1/4 of costa to 1/3 of dorsum, strongly outwards bowed beneath costa; 2nd line also double, slightly waved, from about 3/4 of costa to 3/4 of dorsum, strongly bowed outwards immediately below costa; discal dot small, clear white, outlined in grey; a fine blackish grey terminal line, and three clear black dots on termen above tornus; no costal marking between origin of second line and apex; cilia white, narrowly silvery-metallic at base. The hindwings are very pale brownish-white, almost pure white towards base, a fine grey terminal line; cilia clear white with faint greyish sub-basal line.

G. bipunctella is similar in appearance to G. harmonica.

== Distribution ==
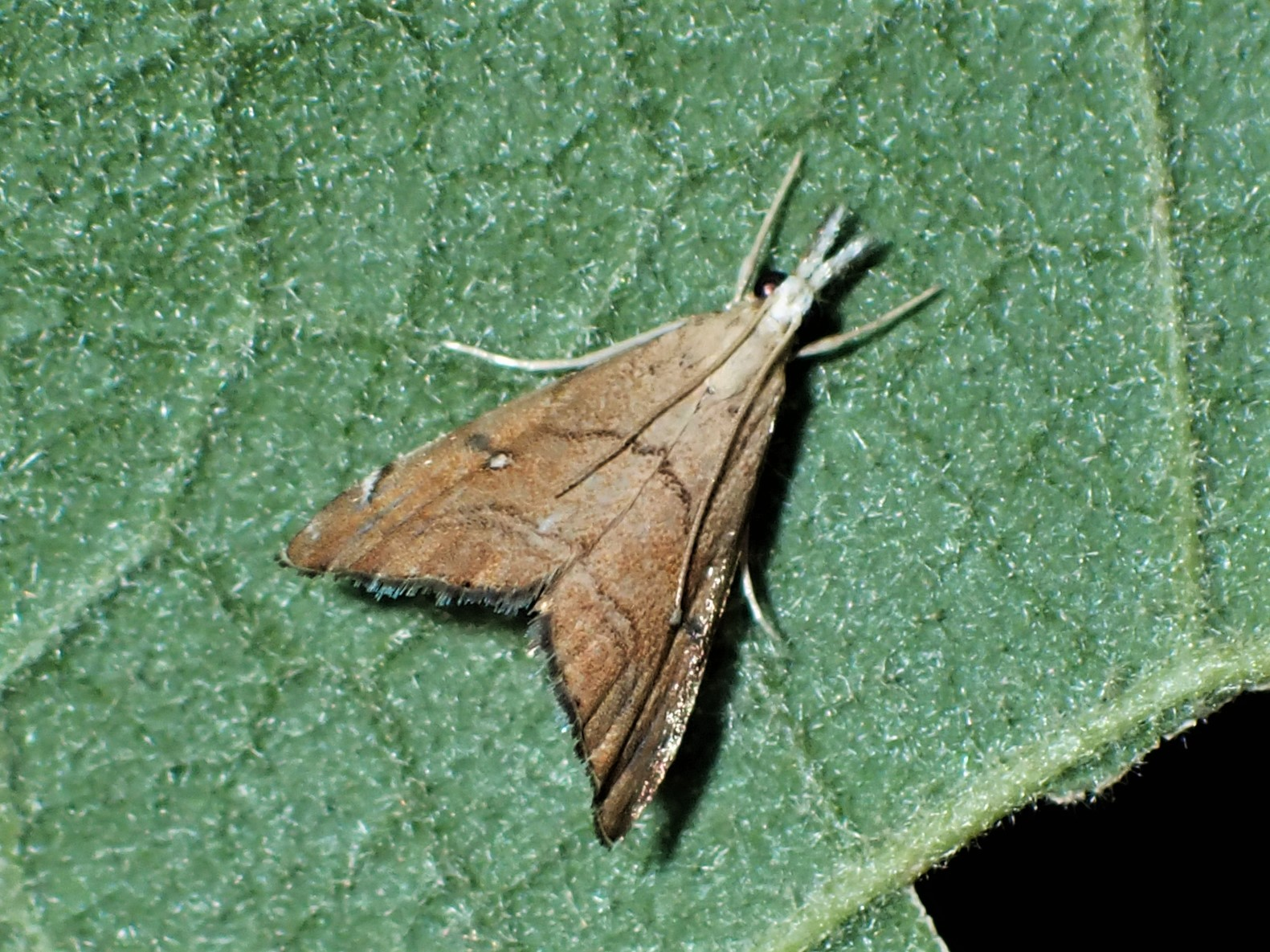
Live specimen.

G. bipunctella is endemic to New Zealand. This species has been found in Albany north of Auckland as well as in the southern parts of the North Island from Palmerston North and Pohangina in the Ruahine Range southwards. It is also found in the Nelson region.

== Habitat and hosts ==
G. bipunctella inhabits dense native forest. Larvae of this species have been reared on liverworts.

== Behaviour ==
The adults of this species are on the wing in November, December and January. Adult moths are attracted to light.
