= Bryobeckettia =

Scientific classification
- Kingdom: Plantae
- Division: Bryophyta
- Class: Bryopsida
- Order: Funariales
- Family: Funariaceae
- Genus: Bryobeckettia; A.J.Fife, 1985

Genus of mosses

Bryobeckettia is a genus of mosses belonging to the family Funariaceae.

The species of this genus are found in New Zealand.

== Species ==
- Bryobeckettia bartlettii Fife, 1985
