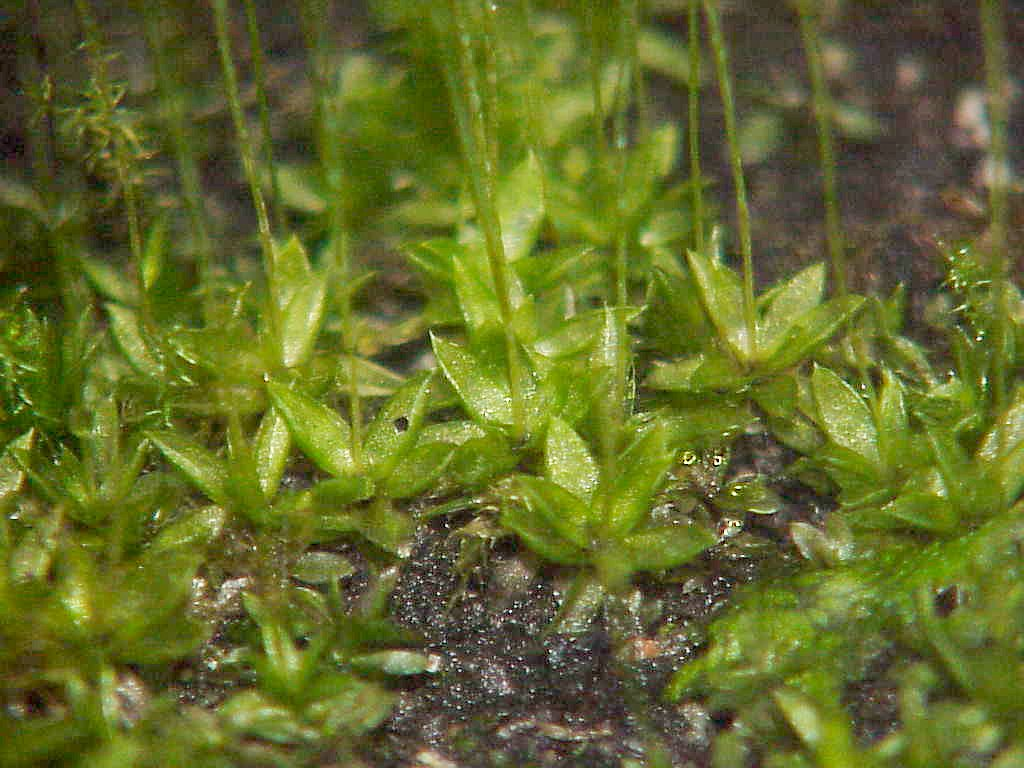
- Funaria hygrometrica

Scientific classification
- Kingdom: Plantae
- Division: Bryophyta
- Class: Bryopsida
- Subclass: Funariidae
- Order: Funariales
- Family: Funariaceae
- Genus: Funaria; Hedw.

Species
- Funaria apophysata Funaria hygrometrica

= Funaria =

Genus of mosses

Funaria is a genus of approximately 210 species of moss. Funaria hygrometrica is the most common species. Funaria hygrometrica is called “cord moss” because of the twisted seta which is very hygroscopic and untwists when moist. The name is derived from the Latin word “funis”, meaning "a rope". In funaria root like structures called rhizoids are present.

Capsules are abundant with the moss surviving as spore when conditions are not suitable.

Moss plant Funaria grows in dense patches or cushions in moist shady and cool places on rocks, walls or crevices during the rainy seasons. It has a height of 3–5 cm, a radial symmetry with a differentiation of an axis or stem, leaves or phylloids are multicellular colorless branched rhizoids with oblique septa.

These are primitive multicellular, autotrophic, shade loving, amphibious plants. They reproduce by spore formation. They have no vascular system. Root like structures called rhizoids are present. They show alternation of generation i.e. the gametophytic stage alternates with the sporophytic stage.

== External structure of gametophyte ==
Plant body is gametophytic and consists of two stages: juvenile and adult.

The juvenile stage is represented by "primary protonema" (thread-like structures formed directly by spore germination).

The adult stage is represented by leafy gametophore which is differentiated into rhizoids, axis and leaves. Rhizoids arise from the base of the axis and they are slender, branched, obliquely septate and provide anchorage for the bryophyte. The axis is a stem-like structure arising from the rhizoid, long, slender, monopodially branched. The each branch is extra axilliary arising form the base of a leaf. The leaves are sessile, oblong-ovate with entire margin and pointed apex. Each leaf is transversed by a mid rib. Leaves are born spirally around the axis.

== Morphology ==
The adult plant body is foliose gametophyte which is leafy and branched which is differentiated into axis, leaves, rhizoids.

Axis/Stem: Small, erect, upright, slender, monopodially branched

Leaves: Spirally arranged around the axis. Flat, green with a well-defined mid-rib. Lower leaves are smaller and scattered and upper leaves are large and crowded.

Rhizoids: Basal, branched, multicellular, obliquely septated mainly for absorption of minerals and anchorage to substratum.

== T.S. of axis ==
Divided into 3 regions:

- epidermis (outermost single layered protective layer bearing chlorophyllated cells)
- cortex (layer of parenchymatous cells between epidermis and central conducting strands; young cells have chloroplasts and older cells lack chloroplasts)
- inner conducting strands (made of long, narrow, slender, dead cells which is mainly used for mechanical support to the axis and for water conduction.

== T.S of leaf ==
The transverse section of the leaf shows a well-defined mid-rib with two lateral wings except in the mid-rib region. There are single-layered parenchymatous polygonal cells with prominent chloroplasts. The central part of the mid-rib has a narrow conducting strand of thick walled cells that helps in conduction.

== Accepted species ==
1. Funaria acicularis Müll. Hal.
2. Funaria acidota (Taylor) Broth.
3. Funaria acutifolia (Hampe) Broth.
4. Funaria aequidens Lindb. ex Broth.
5. Funaria altiseta (Herzog) Broth.
6. Funaria altissima Dixon
7. Funaria americana Lindb.
8. Funaria ampliretis (Rehmann ex Müll. Hal.) Broth.
9. Funaria andicola (Mitt.) Broth.
10. Funaria anomala Jur.
11. Funaria antarctica (Müll. Hal.) Broth.
12. Funaria apiahyensis (Müll. Hal.) Broth.
13. Funaria apiculatopilosa Cardot
14. Funaria apophysata (Taylor) Broth.
15. Funaria arctica (Berggr.) Kindb.
16. Funaria arenicola (Lazarenko) Loeske
17. Funaria aristatula Müll. Hal.
18. Funaria balansae (Besch.) Broth.
19. Funaria beccarii (Hampe) Broth.
20. Funaria bergiana (Hornsch.) Broth.
21. Funaria berteroana Hampe ex Müll. Hal.
22. Funaria beyrichii Hampe
23. Funaria bogosica Müll. Hal.
24. Funaria bonplandii (Hook.) Broth.
25. Funaria borbonica (Besch.) Broth.
26. Funaria borneensis Dixon
27. Funaria brassii (E.B. Bartram) W. Schultze-Motel
28. Funaria buseana (Dozy & Molk.) Broth.
29. Funaria calvescens Schwägr.
30. Funaria cameruniae Dixon
31. Funaria campylopodioides (Müll. Hal.) Broth.
32. Funaria capillaris Warnst.
33. Funaria capillipes Broth.
34. Funaria cartilaginea (Müll. Hal.) Broth.
35. Funaria chevalieri P. de la Varde
36. Funaria chilensis (Thér.) Thér.
37. Funaria chiloensis (Mitt.) Broth.
38. Funaria clavaeformis (Müll. Hal. & Hampe) Broth.
39. Funaria clavata (Mitt.) Magill
40. Funaria clavellata (Mitt.) Broth.
41. Funaria commixta Thér.
42. Funaria commutata (Durieu & Mont.) Lindb.
43. Funaria contorta (E.B. Bartram) W. Schultze-Motel
44. Funaria convexa Spruce
45. Funaria costesii Thér.
46. Funaria curvi-apiculata (Müll. Hal.) Broth.
47. Funaria curvipes (Müll. Hal.) Broth.
48. Funaria curviseta (Schwägr.) Milde
49. Funaria decaryi Thér.
50. Funaria delicatula Thér.
51. Funaria deserticola Trab.
52. Funaria discelioides Müll. Hal.
53. Funaria diversinervis (Müll. Hal.) Broth.
54. Funaria dozyana (Müll. Hal.) Broth.
55. Funaria eberhardtii (Broth. & Paris) Broth.
56. Funaria erectiuscula Mitt.
57. Funaria euryloma Dixon
58. Funaria eurystoma (Mitt.) Broth.
59. Funaria excurrentinervis Cardot & P. de la Varde
60. Funaria faucium (Herzog) Broth.
61. Funaria flava (Müll. Hal.) Broth.
62. Funaria flavicans Michx.
63. Funaria flexiseta (Müll. Hal.) Broth.
64. Funaria fontana (Herzog) Broth.
65. Funaria fontanesii Schwägr.
66. Funaria fritzei Geh.
67. Funaria fuscescens Mitt.
68. Funaria glabripes (Müll. Hal.) Broth.
69. Funaria gracilis (Hook. f. & Wilson) Broth.
70. Funaria grossidens Broth.
71. Funaria hildebrandtii (Müll. Hal.) Broth.
72. Funaria holstii Broth.
73. Funaria hookeriana Thér.
74. Funaria hosseusii E.B. Bartram
75. Funaria husnotii (Schimp. ex Besch.) Broth.
76. Funaria hygrometrica Hedw.
77. Funaria hygrometrica f. breviseta (Broth.) Cufod.
78. Funaria hygrometrica var. calvescens (Schwägr.) Mont.
79. Funaria hygrometrica x physcomitrium acuminatum L. Bauer & Broseg
80. Funaria imerinensis Cardot
81. Funaria incompleta Müll. Hal.
82. Funaria incurvifolia Müll. Hal. ex E. Britton
83. Funaria inflata Müll. Hal.
84. Funaria integra (Müll. Hal.) Broth.
85. Funaria jamesonii (Taylor) Taylor
86. Funaria japonica Broth.
87. Funaria javanica (Dozy & Molk.) Broth.
88. Funaria kilimandscharica Müll. Hal.
89. Funaria koelzei E.B. Bartram
90. Funaria krausei (Besch.) Geh. & Herzog
91. Funaria laevis Mitt.
92. Funaria laxissima Müll. Hal.
93. Funaria leibergii (E. Britton) Broth.
94. Funaria lepervanchei (Besch.) Broth.
95. Funaria lignicola Broth.
96. Funaria limbata (Müll. Hal.) Broth.
97. Funaria lindigii (Hampe) Broth.
98. Funaria linearidens Müll. Hal.
99. Funaria longicollis Dixon
100. Funaria longiseta (Schimp.) Broth.
101. Funaria ludoviciae Broth. & Paris
102. Funaria luteo-limbata Broth.
103. Funaria lutescens (Hampe) Broth.
104. Funaria macrocarpa (Schimp.) R.H. Zander
105. Funaria macrospora R.S. Williams
106. Funaria maireana Copp.
107. Funaria marginatula (Müll. Hal.) Cardot
108. Funaria mathwesii (Hook. f.) Broth.
109. Funaria mauritiana (Schimp. ex Besch.) Broth.
110. Funaria mayottensis (Besch.) Broth.
111. Funaria meeseacea Müll. Hal.
112. Funaria megalostoma Mitt.
113. Funaria microcarpa (Müll. Hal.) Broth.
114. Funaria micropyxis (Müll. Hal.) Broth.
115. Funaria microstoma Bruch ex Schimp.
116. Funaria minuticaulis (Müll. Hal. ex Geh.) Watts & Whitel.
117. Funaria mittenii (Dozy & Molk.) Broth.
118. Funaria muhlenbergii Turner
119. Funaria muhlenbergii var. alpina (J.J. Amann) Castelli
120. Funaria nilotica Broth.
121. Funaria noumeana (Besch.) Broth.
122. Funaria nubica Müll. Hal.
123. Funaria obtusa (Hedw.) Lindb.
124. Funaria obtusa var. ahnfeltii (Fr.) Kindb.
125. Funaria obtusa var. notarisii (Schimp.) Pavletic
126. Funaria obtusata Schimp.
127. Funaria obtuso-apiculata (Müll. Hal.) Broth.
128. Funaria oligophylla (Müll. Hal.) Broth.
129. Funaria orizabensis Müll. Hal.
130. Funaria orthocarpa Mitt.
131. Funaria ouropratensis (Paris) Thér.
132. Funaria papillosa (Müll. Hal.) Wijk & Margad.
133. Funaria paucifolia (Müll. Hal.) Broth.
134. Funaria pellucida (Müll. Hal.) Broth.
135. Funaria perlaxa Thér.
136. Funaria perrottetii (Müll. Hal.) Broth.
137. Funaria pilifera (Mitt.) Broth.
138. Funaria plagiothecia (Müll. Hal.) Broth.
139. Funaria planifolia (Thwaites & Mitt.) Broth.
140. Funaria polaris Bryhn
141. Funaria porteri Thér.
142. Funaria producta (Mitt.) Broth.
143. Funaria puiggarii (Geh. & Hampe) Broth.
144. Funaria pulchella H. Philib.
145. Funaria pulchra Dixon & P. de la Varde
146. Funaria pulchricolor Müll. Hal.
147. Funaria ramulosa (Hampe) Paris
148. Funaria renauldii (Thér.) Cardot
149. Funaria rhizomatica (Müll. Hal.) Broth.
150. Funaria rhizophylla (Sakurai) Sakurai
151. Funaria rhomboidea J. Shaw
152. Funaria riparia Lindb.
153. Funaria robustior (Müll. Hal.) Broth.
154. Funaria rottleri (Schwägr.) Broth.
155. Funaria saharae Trab.
156. Funaria sartorii Müll. Hal.
157. Funaria schinzii (Geh.) Broth.
158. Funaria schnyderi Müll. Hal.
159. Funaria serrata Brid.
160. Funaria serricola (Müll. Hal.) Broth.
161. Funaria sickenbergeri Müll. Hal.
162. Funaria sinuato-limbata Cardot & P. de la Varde
163. Funaria sipascoyae (Herzog) Broth.
164. Funaria sovatensis Schimp. ex Müll. Hal.
165. Funaria spathulata Schimp. ex Müll. Hal.
166. Funaria spathulifolia (Cardot & Thér.) Broth.
167. Funaria subcuspidata Broth.
168. Funaria suberecta Mitt.
169. Funaria subimmarginata Cardot & P. de la Varde
170. Funaria subleptopoda Hampe
171. Funaria submarginata (Müll. Hal.) Broth.
172. Funaria subnuda Taylor
173. Funaria subplanifolia Broth.
174. Funaria subtilis (Müll. Hal.) Broth.
175. Funaria subulata (E.B. Bartram) W. Schultze-Motel
176. Funaria succuleata (Wager & C.H. Wright) Broth. ex Magill
177. Funaria tenella Müll. Hal.
178. Funaria trumpffii (Müll. Hal.) Broth.
179. Funaria uleana (Müll. Hal.) Broth.
180. Funaria undulata (Hampe) Broth.
181. Funaria urceolata (Mitt.) Magill
182. Funaria usambarica Broth.
183. Funaria valdiviae Müll. Hal.
184. Funaria varia (Mitt.) Broth.
185. Funaria verrucosa (Müll. Hal.) Broth.
186. Funaria volkensii Broth.
187. Funaria wallichii (Mitt.) Broth.
188. Funaria wichurae (M. Fleisch.) Broth.
189. Funaria wijkii R.S. Chopra
