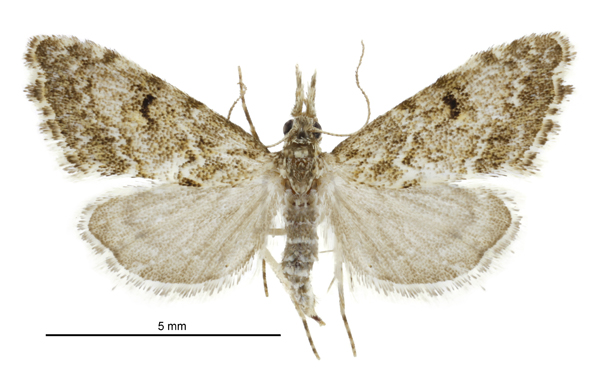
- Female
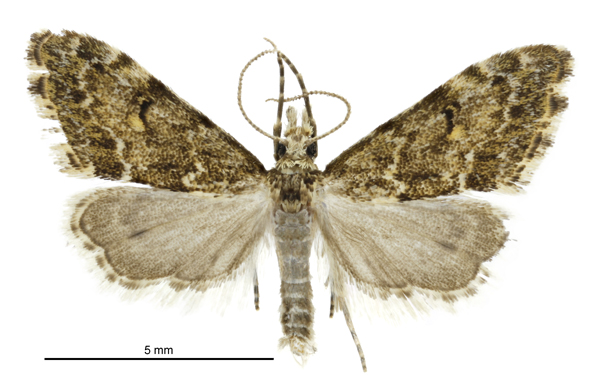
- Male

Scientific classification
- Kingdom: Animalia
- Phylum: Arthropoda
- Clade: Pancrustacea
- Class: Insecta
- Order: Lepidoptera
- Family: Crambidae
- Subfamily: Crambinae
- Tribe: Diptychophorini
- Genus: Glaucocharis
- Species: G. elaina

Binomial name
- Glaucocharis elaina (Meyrick, 1882)

Synonyms
- Diptychophora elaina Meyrick, 1882; Pareromene elaina (Meyrick, 1882)

= Glaucocharis elaina =

Species of moth endemic to New Zealand

Glaucocharis elaina is a species of moth in the family Crambidae. This species was described by Edward Meyrick in 1882. It is endemic to New Zealand and is found throughout the North and South Island with the exception of the extreme south of the South Island. The preferred habitat of this species is lowland native forest and as adults the species is attracted to broken ground including road or rail cuttings. Larvae feed on moss species including those in the genus Funaria. This species has two distinct broods during each year. Adults are on the wing from October to April, are nocturnal and are attracted to light.

== Taxonomy ==
This species was first described by Edward Meyrick in 1882 and named Diptychophora elaina. Meyrick gave a fuller description of this species in 1883. George Hudson discussed and illustrated this species under that name in his 1928 book The butterflies and moths of New Zealand. In 1929 Alfred Philpott studied the male genitalia of this species. In 1971 David Gaskin placed this species in the genus Pareromene. In 1985 Gaskin again discussed this species and placed it in the genus Glaucocharis. The male lectotype, collected at the Wellington Botanic Garden by Meyrick, is held at the Natural History Museum, London.

== Description ==
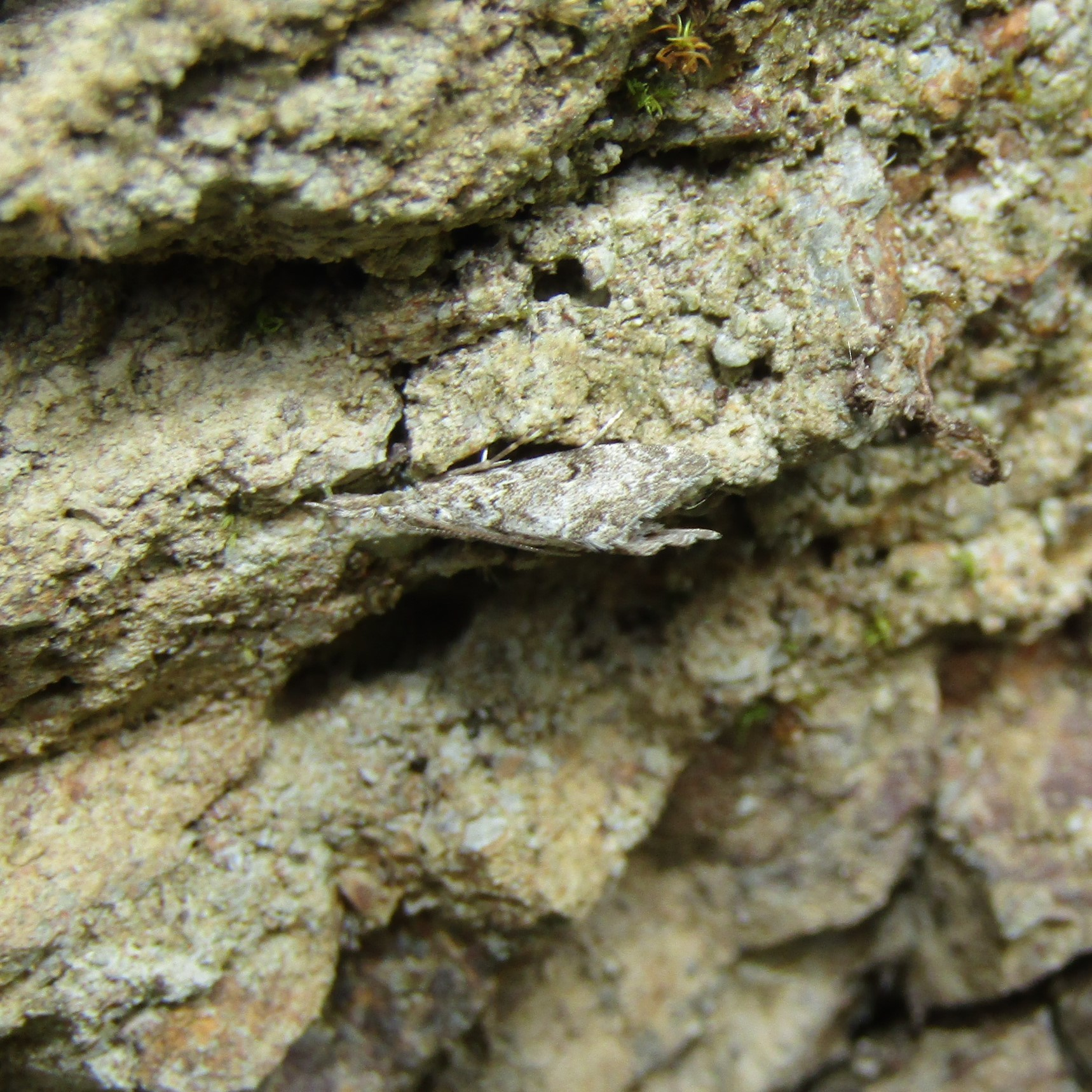
G. elaina showing how well its colouration works as camouflage.

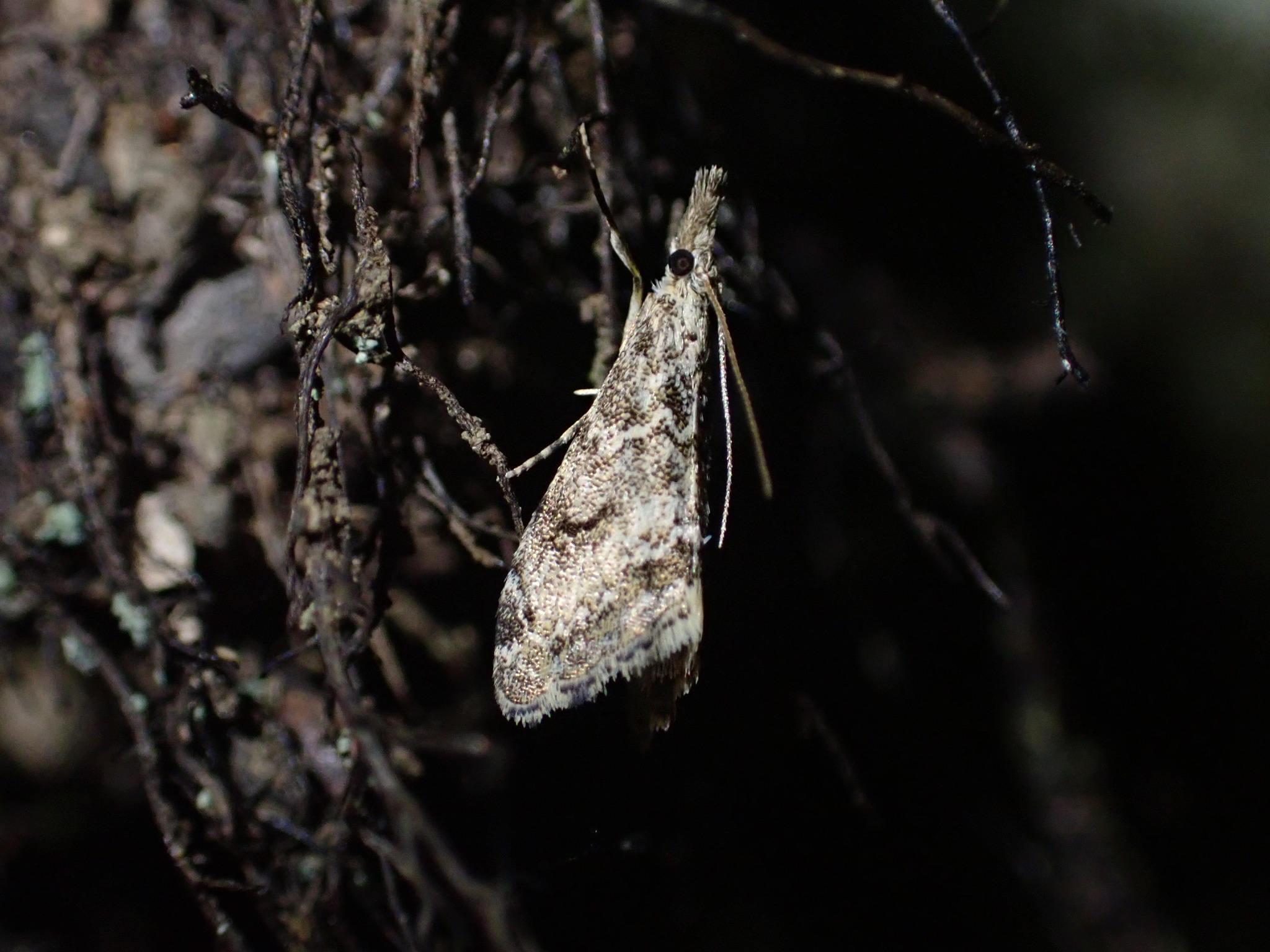
Live specimen.

Gaskin described the egg of this species as follows:

Flattened ovoid; no ribs; having a microscopic hexagonal pattern on shell; dimensions 0.32-0.34 X 0.19-0.20 mm.

Gaskin described the larva of this species as follows:

The fully grown caterpillar is about three-quarters of an inch long and greyish in colour. It has an irregular reddish line down the back, and some black and whitish marks.

Hudson described the adult of this species as follows:

The expansion of the wings is slightly over 1/2 inch. The fore-wings are pale grey slightly ochreous-tinged and finely speckled with blackish, especially near the base and termen, the space between the two transverse lines being usually paler; there is an elongate black spot slightly above the middle of the wing. The hind-wings are pale grey.

Hudson states that the grey colouration of this moth is protective and helps camouflage it against lichen covered rocks or tree trunks.

This species is very similar in appearance to Glaucocharis parorma and the two species have often been confused in collections. However G. parorma has a series of black terminal dots on its forewing which G. elaina lacks and so the two species are able to be distinguished via that characteristic.

== Distribution ==
This species is endemic to New Zealand and other than in the extreme south of the South Island is found throughout the country.

== Habitat and hosts ==
The adults inhabit lowland native forest and can often be found near broken ground. They have been seen in numbers at road or rail cuttings near native forest or bush. The larvae of this species feed on mosses including species in the genus Funaria.

== Life cycle and behaviour ==
Both Hudson and Gaskin believed this species has two distinct broods. The eggs are laid in patches in early to late summer on moss. Gaskin hypothesised that this species spends the winter months as pupae. The larvae create their pupa in a chamber amongst the moss the caterpillar feeds from. The adults of G. elaina are on the wing from October until April, are nocturnal and are attracted to light.
