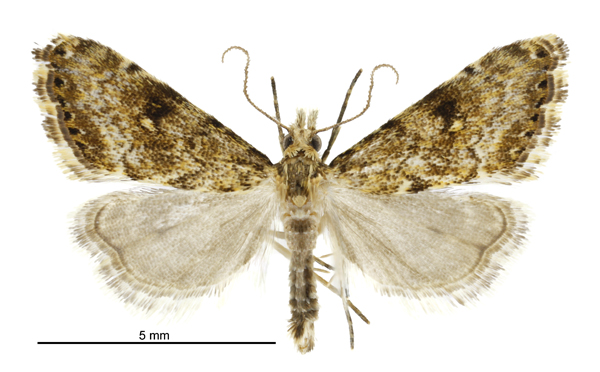
- Male

Scientific classification
- Kingdom: Animalia
- Phylum: Arthropoda
- Clade: Pancrustacea
- Class: Insecta
- Order: Lepidoptera
- Family: Crambidae
- Subfamily: Crambinae
- Tribe: Diptychophorini
- Genus: Glaucocharis
- Species: G. parorma

Binomial name
- Glaucocharis parorma (Meyrick, 1924)

Synonyms
- Diptychophora parorma Meyrick, 1924; Pareromene parorma (Meyrick, 1924)

= Glaucocharis parorma =

Species of moth endemic to New Zealand

Glaucocharis parorma is a moth of the family Crambidae. It was first described by Edward Meyrick in 1924. It is endemic to New Zealand and is found in the North Island. This species inhabits native forest from lowland to subalpine altitudes. Larvae of Glaucocharis species feed on mosses and liverworts. Adults are on the wing from October to February. This species is very similar in appearance to G. elaina but can be distinguished as a result of the black terminal dots on its forewings.

== Taxonomy ==
This species was first described by Edward Meyrick in 1924 using two specimens collected at Mount Ruapehu and at Wainuiomata in December and January by George Hudson and originally named Diptychophora parorma. George Hudson discussed and illustrated this species under that name in his 1928 book The butterflies and moths of New Zealand. In 1971 David Edward Gaskin placed this species in the genus Pareromene. However in 1985 Gaskin recognised that Glaucocharis must take precedence over Pareromene and placed G. parorma into that genus. The male lectotype specimen, collected Mount Ruapehu by Hudson, is held at the Natural History Museum, London.

== Description ==
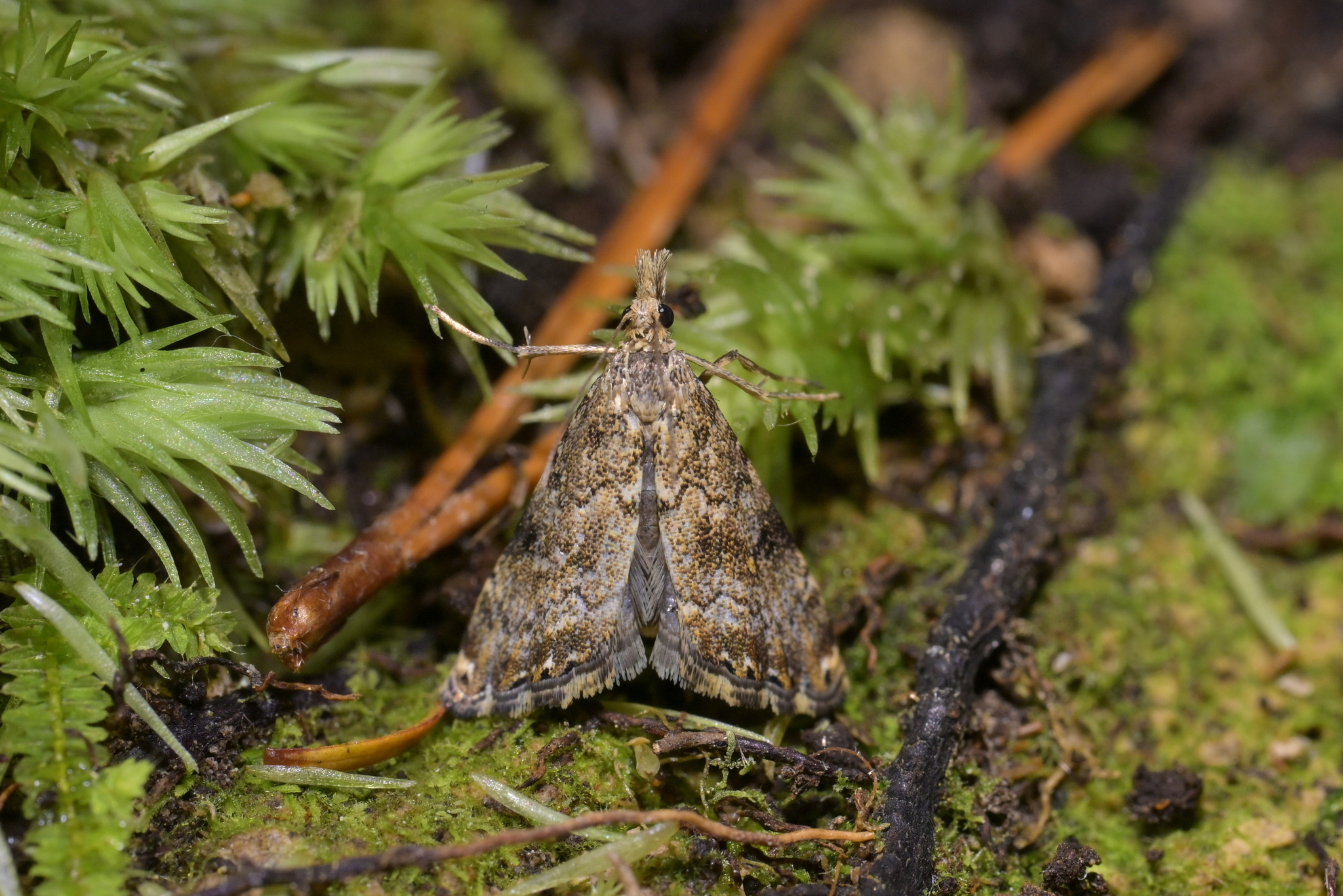
G. parorma with black terminal dots visible.

Meyrick described this species as follows:

♂. 13-14 mm. Head ochreous-whitish. Palpi ochreous-whitish mixed with grey. Thorax whitish mixed with dark grey. Forewings with termen more oblique than in elaina; whitish, slightly sprinkled grey; base spotted with blackish-grey, then some blackish-grey irroration tinged with whitish-ochreous, followed by first line, which is irregular, black, angulated outwards in disc and inwards towards termen; an obscure curved rather broad median shade of grey suffusion mixed with whitish-ochreous, above its middle an irregular X-shaped black mark, lower angle resting oh a roundish white spot; second line double, fine, grey, curved, waved, indented on fold; a terminal fascia of grey suffusion, including apical dot preceded by a white crescentic mark, and six black semicircular terminal dots more or less edged whitish anteriorly: cilia whitish, a dark grey basal line and greyish subapical line. Hindwings light grey, a, curved whitish line at 3/4, and a whitish terminal line, terminal edge grey; cilia whitish, a light-grey, subbasal line.

Although very similar in appearance to G. elaina, to the point where these two species have been confused in collections, G. parorma can be distinguished as it has a line of black terminal dots on its forewings whereas G. elaina has none.

== Distribution ==
This species is endemic to New Zealand. This species occurs in the North Island.

== Habitat and hosts ==
G. parorma inhabits native forest from lowland to subalpine altitudes. Larvae of Glaucocharis species feed on mosses and liverworts.

== Behaviour ==
This species is on the wing from October to February.
