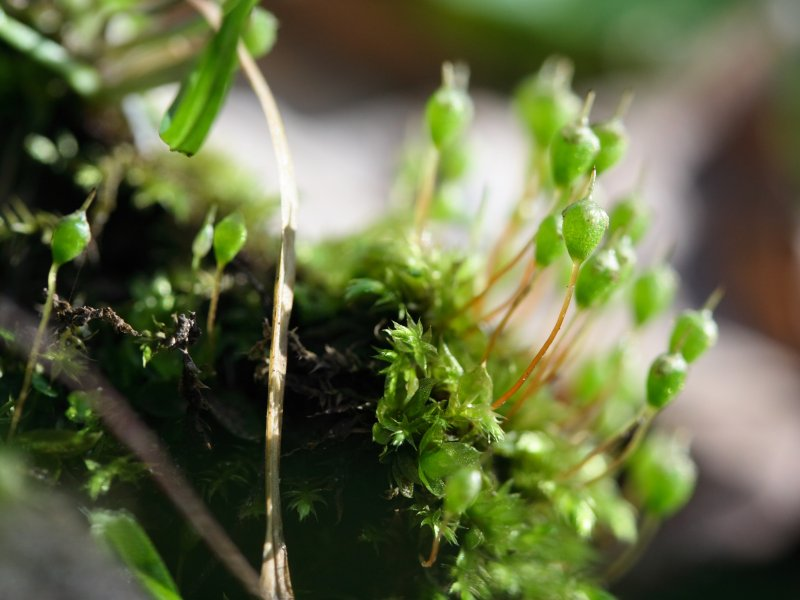
- Physcomitrium pyriforme

Scientific classification
- Kingdom: Plantae
- Division: Bryophyta
- Class: Bryopsida
- Subclass: Funariidae
- Order: Funariales
- Family: Funariaceae
- Genus: Physcomitrium; Bridel

Species
- See text.

= Physcomitrium =

Urn moss

Genus of mosses

Physcomitrium is a genus of mosses, commonly called urn moss after its urn-like calyptra, that includes about 80 species and has a cosmopolitan distribution. The scientific name comes from the Ancient Greek words physkē, meaning large intestine or sausage, and mitrion, meaning little turban. The common name is derived from its symmetrical, erect and urn-like capsules that lack peristomes, these features characterising the genus. They are commonly found on exposed soils that are often associated with locations that become very wet in the spring, such as along river banks or on alluvial mud. They occur from near sea level to about 2500 metres. The capsules mature over the winter and into the spring.

Many species were once circumscribed within the species Physcomitrium pyriforme, which over time has been broken up into many separate species based on variation of the sporophyte and gametophyte.

== Selected species ==
- Physcomitrium australe
- Physcomitrium californicum
- Physcomitrium drummondii
- Physcomitrium kellermanii
- Physcomitrium megalocarpum
- Physcomitrium patens
- Physcomitrium pyriforme
- Physcomitrium turbinatum
