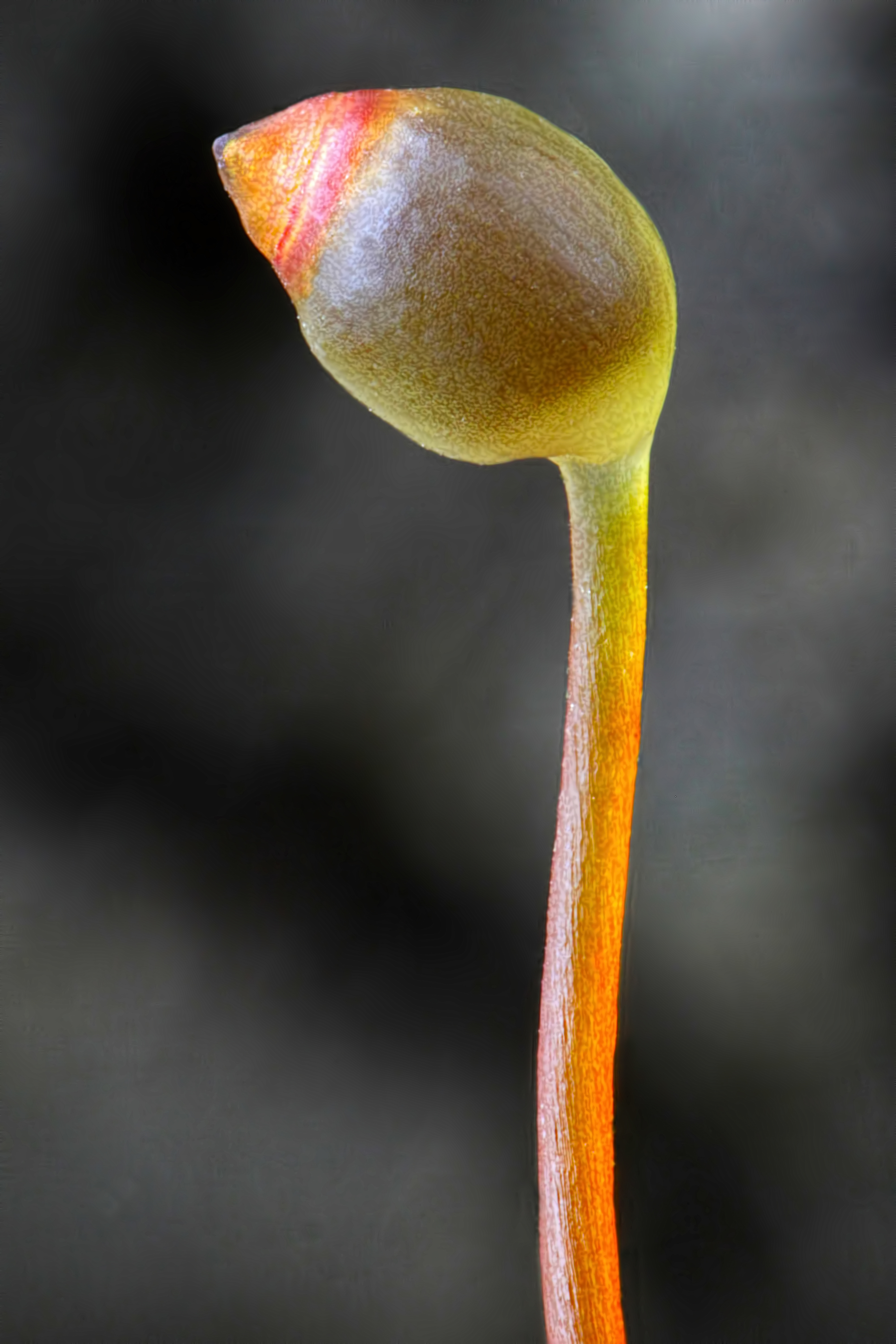

Scientific classification
- Kingdom: Plantae
- Division: Bryophyta
- Class: Bryopsida
- Subclass: Funariidae
- Order: Disceliales
- Family: Disceliaceae; Schimp.
- Genus: Discelium; Brid.
- Species: D. nudum

Binomial name
- Discelium nudum (Dickson) Brid.

= Discelium =

Genus of mosses

Discelium is the only genus of moss in the family Disceliaceae, containing a single species, Discelium nudum, known as flag-moss. This species is rare but is widely distributed across cool and temperate climates of the Northern Hemisphere.
