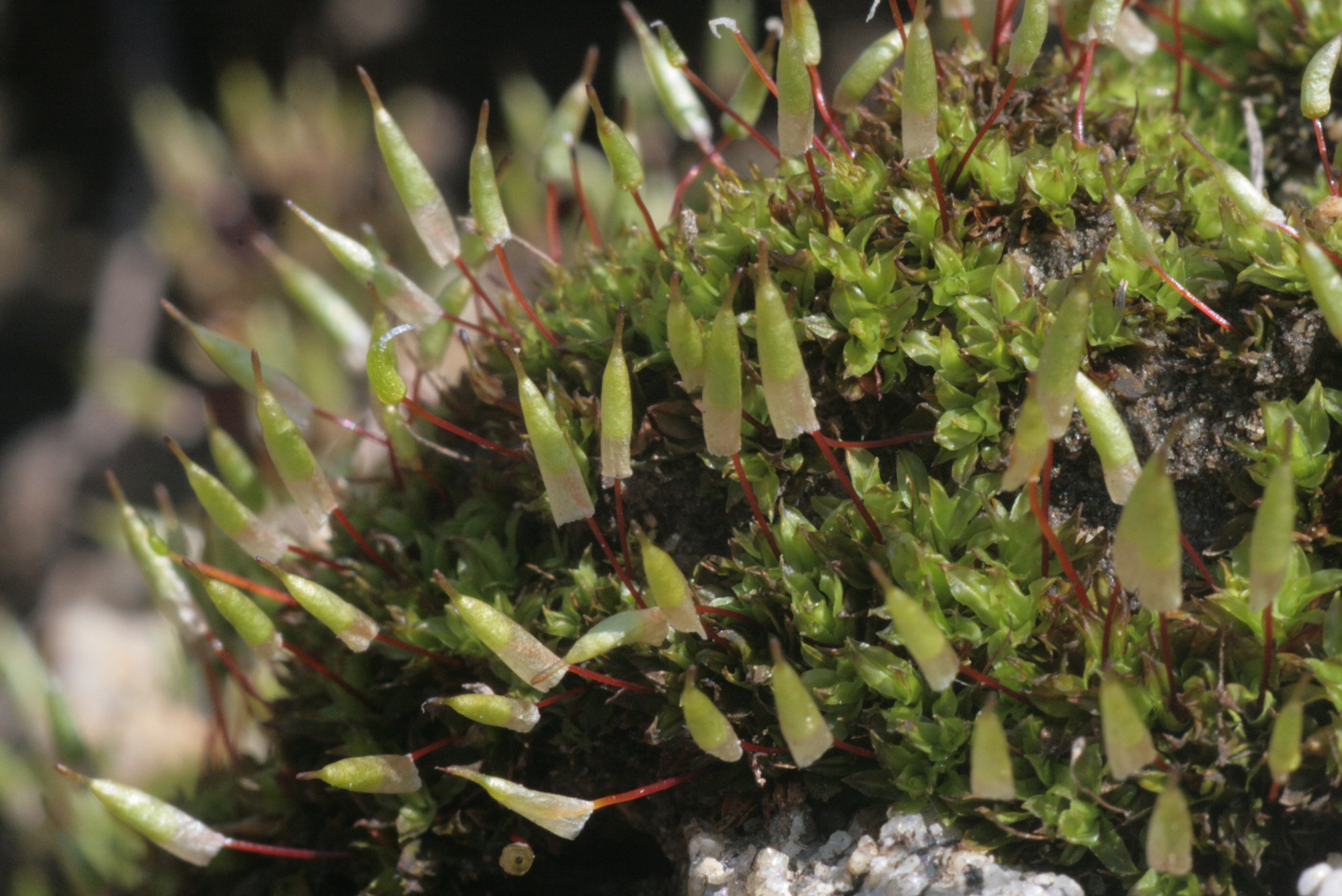
- Encalypta vulgaris

Scientific classification
- Kingdom: Plantae
- Division: Bryophyta
- Class: Bryopsida
- Subclass: Funariidae
- Order: Encalyptales
- Family: Encalyptaceae; Schimp.

Genera
- Bryobrittonia; Encalypta

= Encalyptaceae =

Family of mosses

Encalyptaceae is a family of mosses in order Encalyptales. It includes two genera; the genus Bryobartramia, formerly included in the family, is now placed in its own family.
