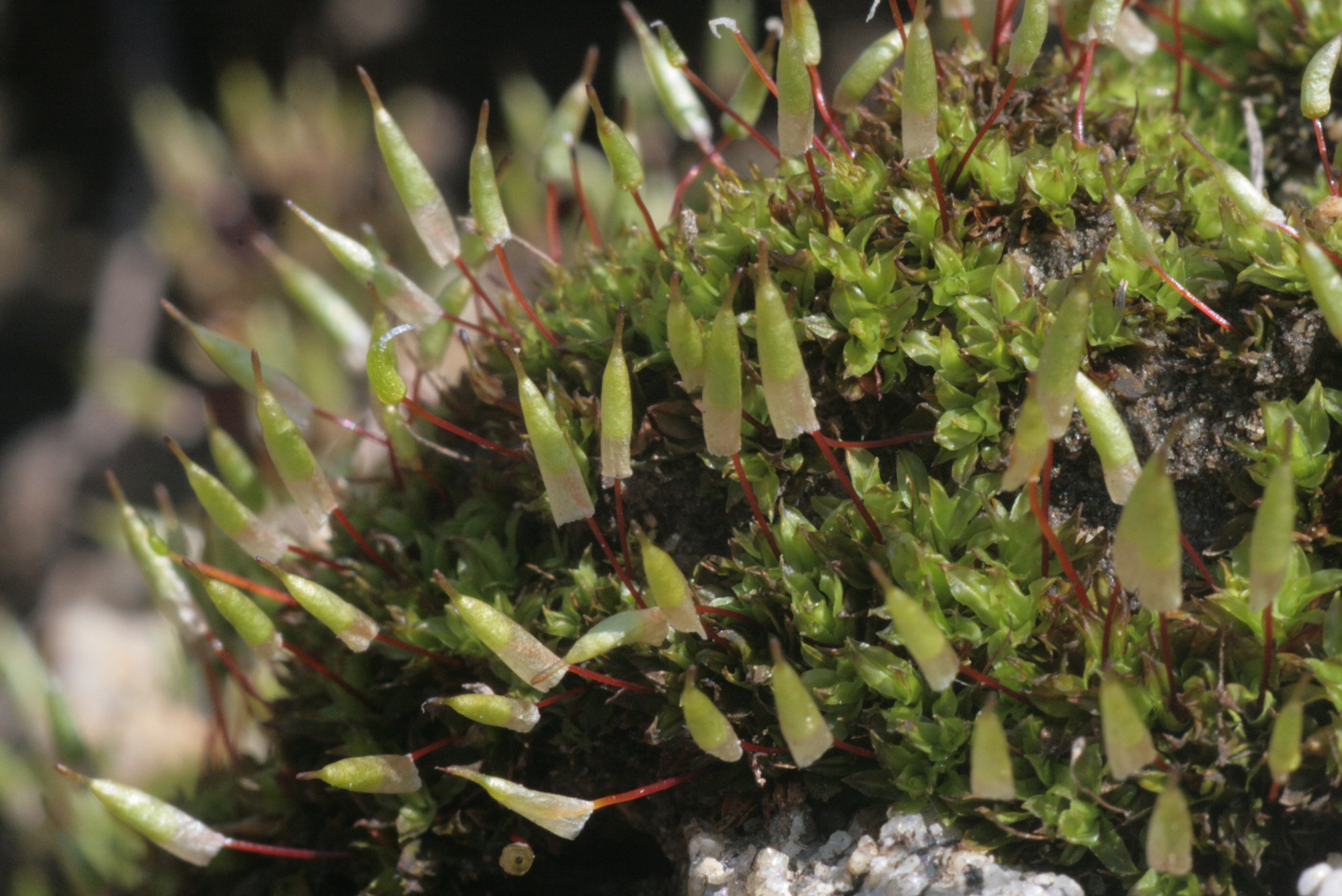
- Encalypta vulgaris

Scientific classification
- Kingdom: Plantae
- Division: Bryophyta
- Class: Bryopsida
- Subclass: Funariidae
- Order: Encalyptales; Dixon

Families
- Encalyptaceae

= Encalyptales =

Order of mosses

Encalyptales is an order of mosses in subclass Funariidae. It contains a single family.
