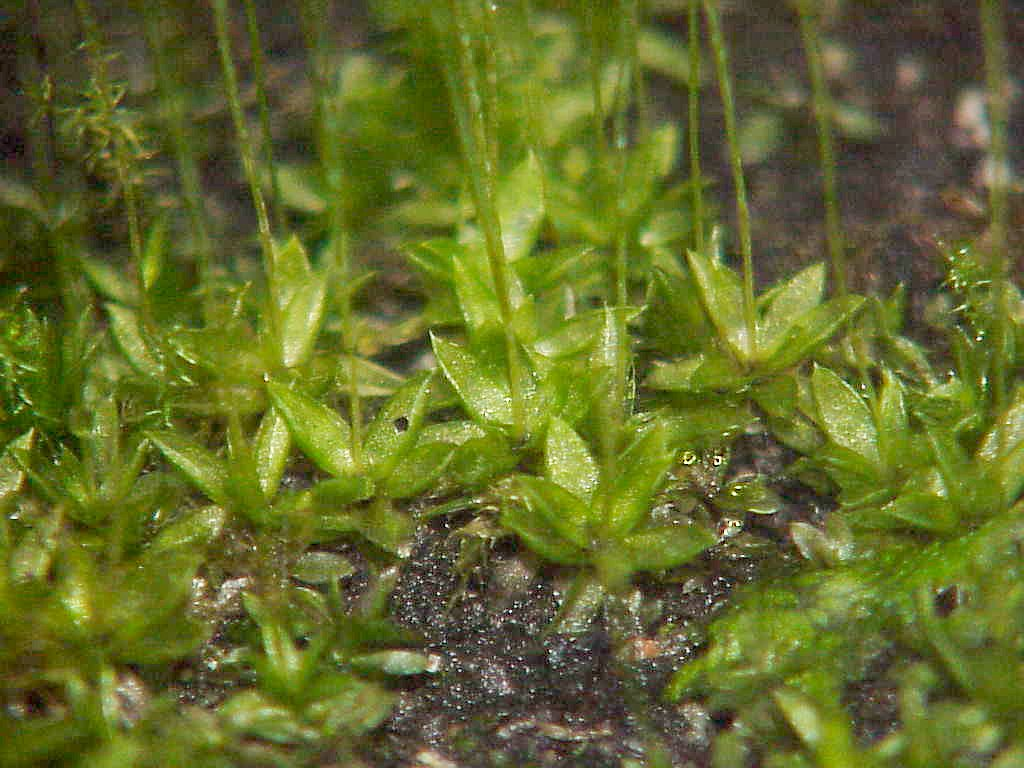
- Funaria hygrometrica

Scientific classification
- Kingdom: Plantae
- Division: Bryophyta
- Class: Bryopsida
- Subclass: Funariidae
- Order: Funariales
- Family: Funariaceae; Schwägr.

Genera
- See text

= Funariaceae =

Family of mosses

The Funariaceae are a family of mosses in the order Funariales. As of January 2025, 233 species are included in the family.

The genus Goniomitrium has been recently moved from the Pottiaceae to the Funariaceae.

== Genera ==
World Flora Online accepts the following genera:

- Afoninia Ignatova, Goffinet & Fedosov (1 species)
- Bryobeckettia Fife (1 species)
- Cygnicollum Fife & Magill (1 species)
- Entosthodon Schwägr. (96 species)
- Funaria Hedw. (53 species)
- Funariella Sérgio (1 species)
- Funariophyscomitrella F.Wettst. (5 species)
- Goniomitrium Hook. & Wilson (3 species)
- Loiseaubryum Bizot (1 species)
- Nanomitriella E.B.Bartram (1 species)
- Physcomitrellopsis Broth. & Wager ex Dixon (1 species)
- Physcomitriopsis D.Subram. (1 species)
- Physcomitrium (Brid.) Brid. (66 species)
- Pyramidula Brid. (1 species)
- Steppomitra Vondr. & Hadač (1 species)
