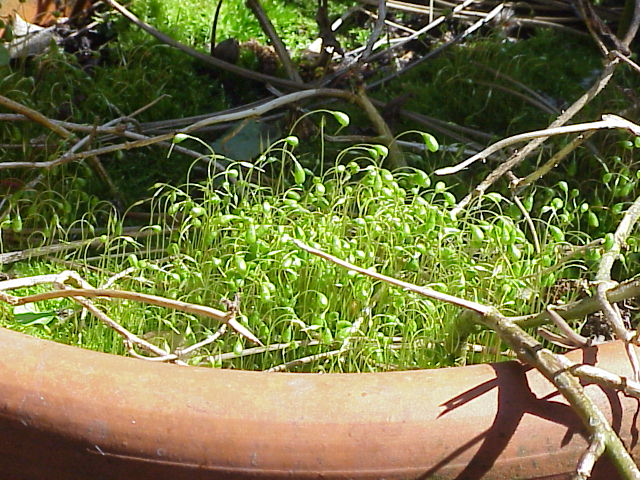
- Funaria hygrometrica

Scientific classification
- Kingdom: Plantae
- Division: Bryophyta
- Class: Bryopsida
- Subclass: Funariidae; Ochyra

Orders
- Encalyptales; Funariales; Disceliales

= Funariidae =

Subclass of mosses

The Funariidae are a widespread group of mosses in class Bryopsida. The majority of species belong to the genera Funaria (c. 200 species) and Physcomitrium (c. 80 species).

== Classification ==
The Funariidae include three monotypic orders, with around 350 species, most of which belong either to the genus Funaria or Physcomitrium.

Order Encalyptales

Family Encalyptaceae (2 genera, 35 species)

Order Funariales

Family Funariaceae (14 genera, ca. 300 species)

Order Disceliales

Family Disceliaceae (1 species Discelium nudum)

== Description ==
Species in the subclass Funariidae typically live on or near the ground. Their stems typically have a central strand differentiated from the surrounding cells. The peristome teeth of their sporangia are arthrodontous, diplolepidous, and opposite.

They are acrocarpous, producing their archegonia at the upper tips of the stem, and hence sporophyte stalks arise from the tip of the stem as well. The capsule of the order Funariales has a well-defined ring of cells called an annulus. When these cells die, their walls rupture, allowing the sporangium lid to fall off, and revealing the peristome. In the other two orders, the annulus is not differentiated. In the Gigaspermales, the capsule is not raised above the plant on a stalk, but remains hidden from view among the leaves. In the Encalyptales, the capsule is jacketed inside the calyptra long after it is raised above the plant, giving the appearance of a tiny mushroom.

== Gallery ==
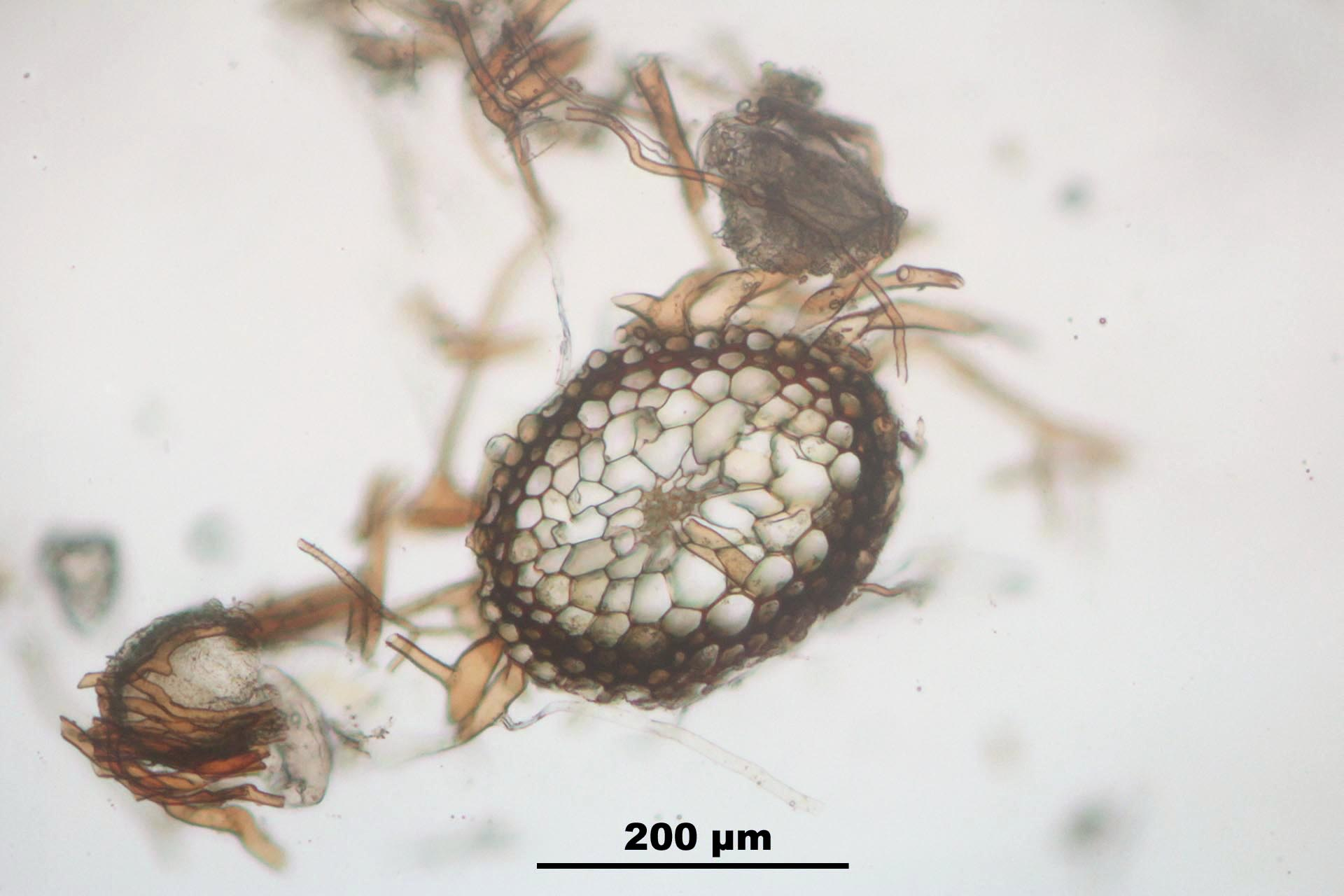
Cross section of stem, showing the central strand.

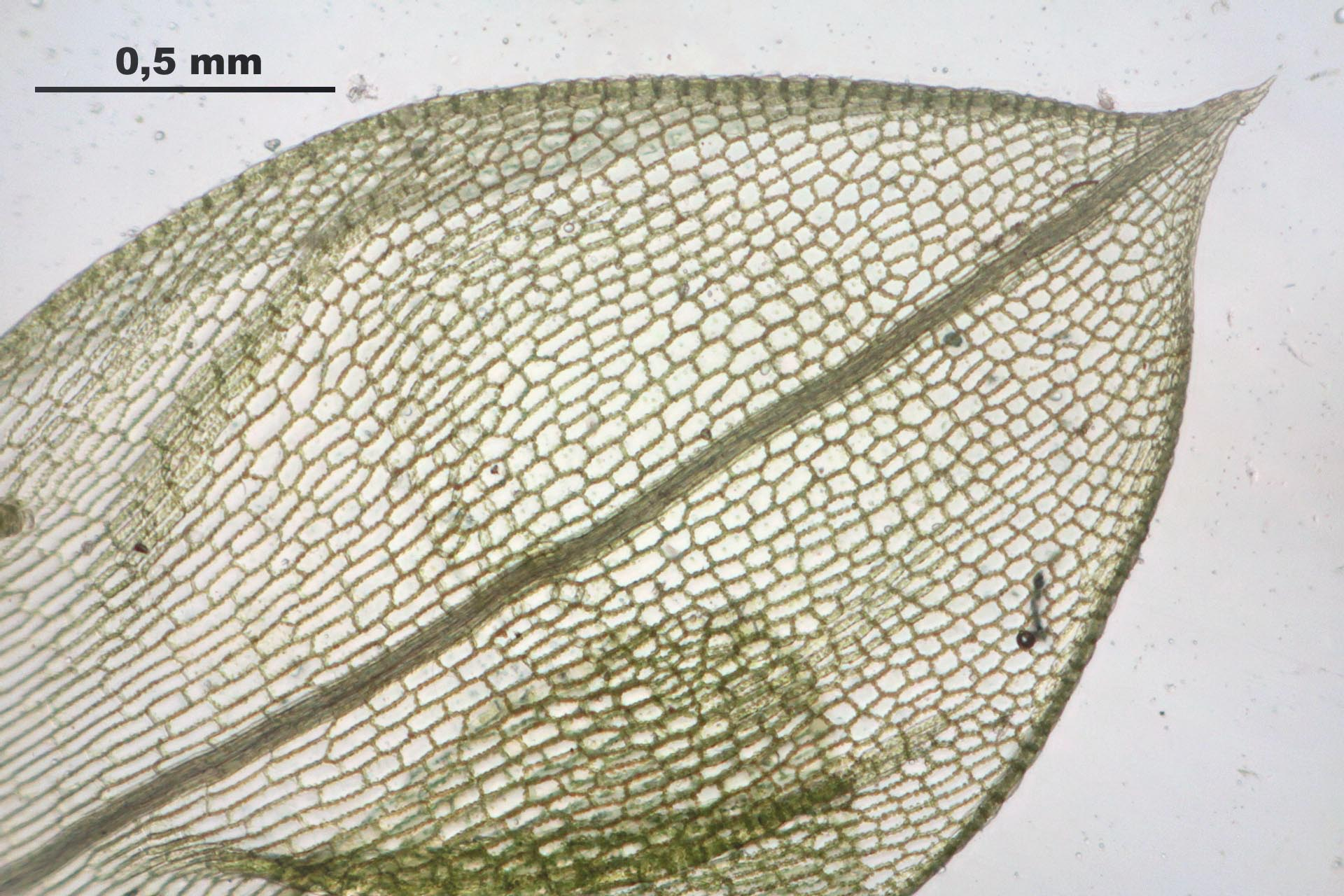
A single leaf, consisting of a single sheet of cells.

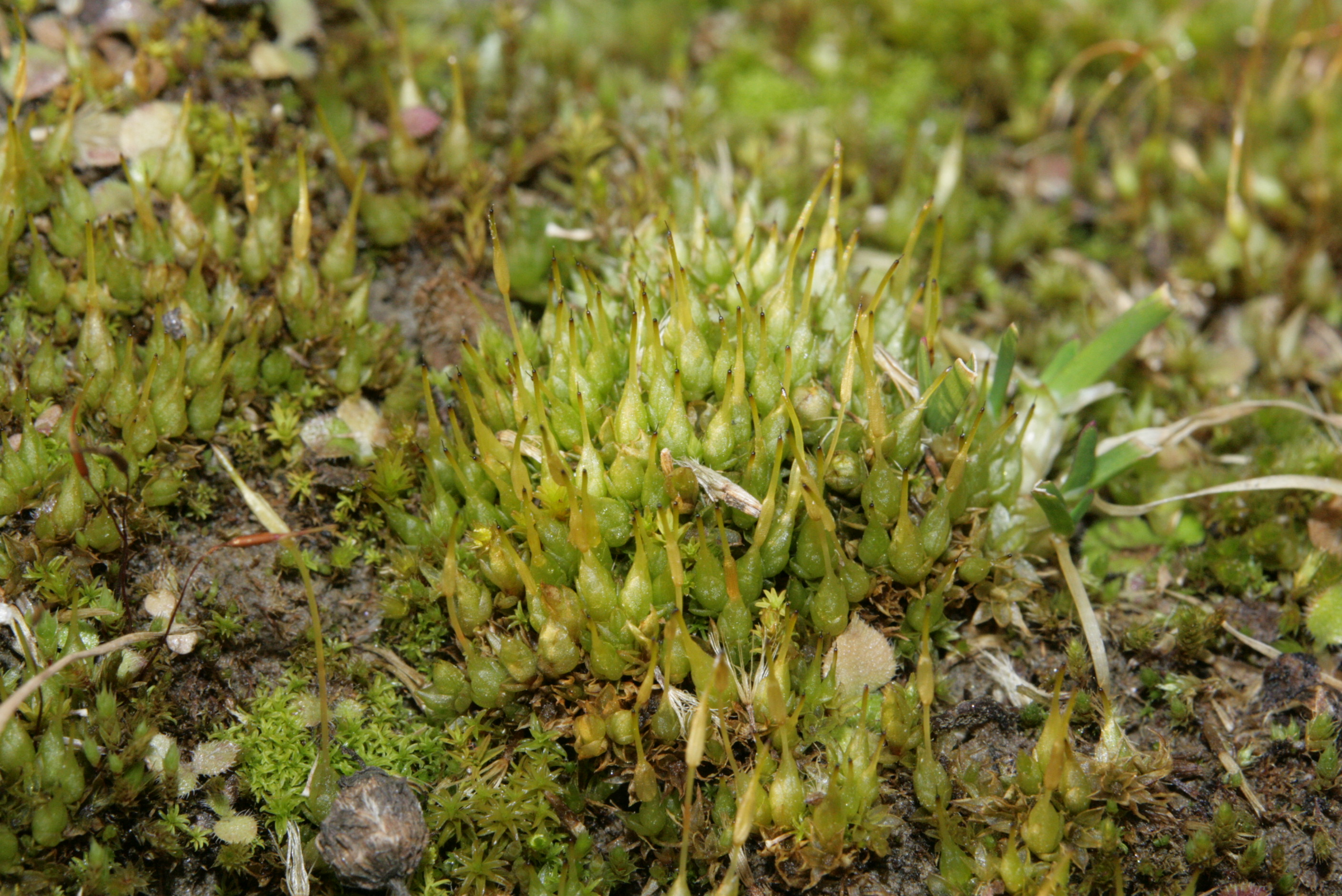
Gametophytes of Funaria hygrometrica with the sporophyte generation emerging from the tips of the plants.

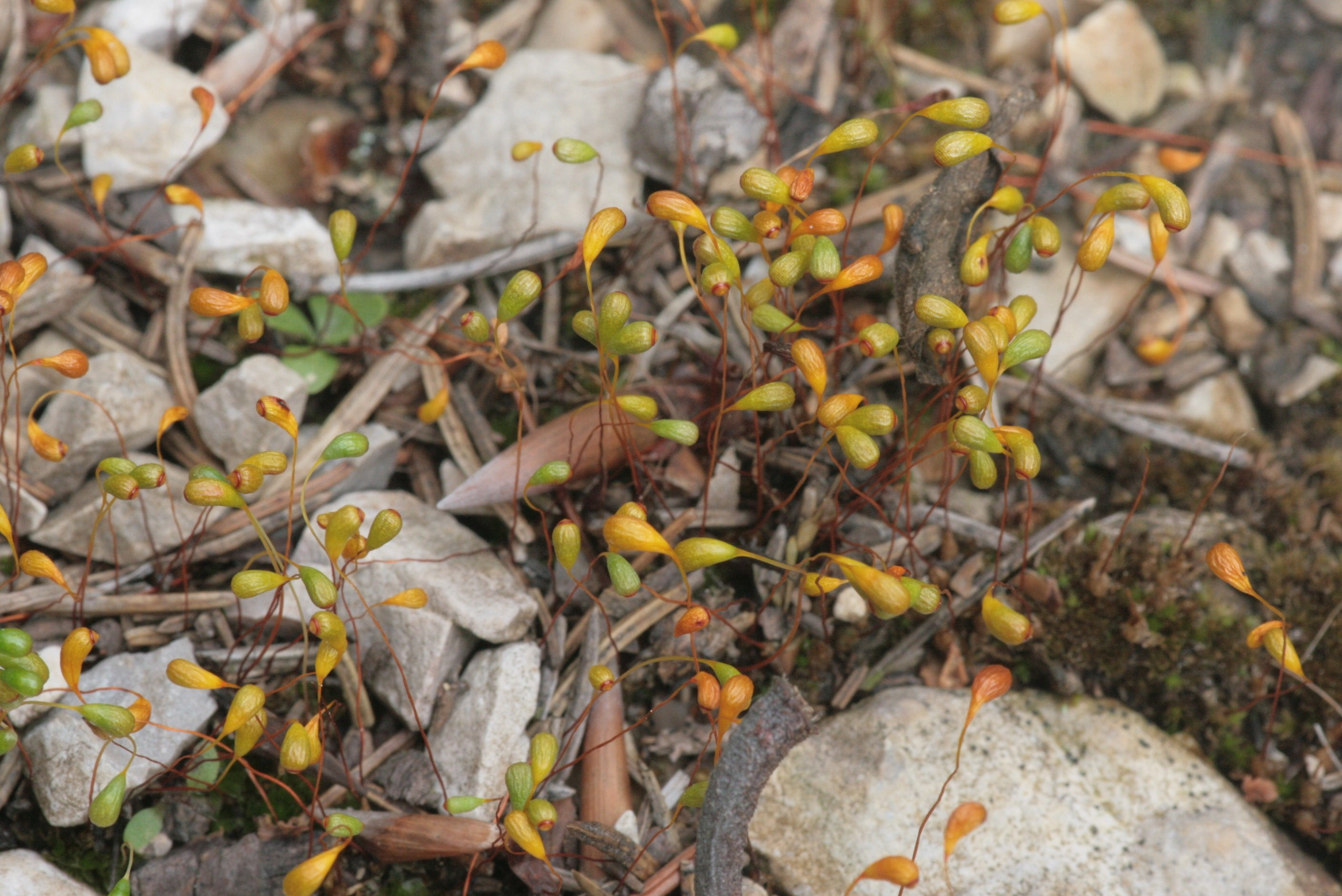
Aging sporophytes of Funaria hygrometrica.

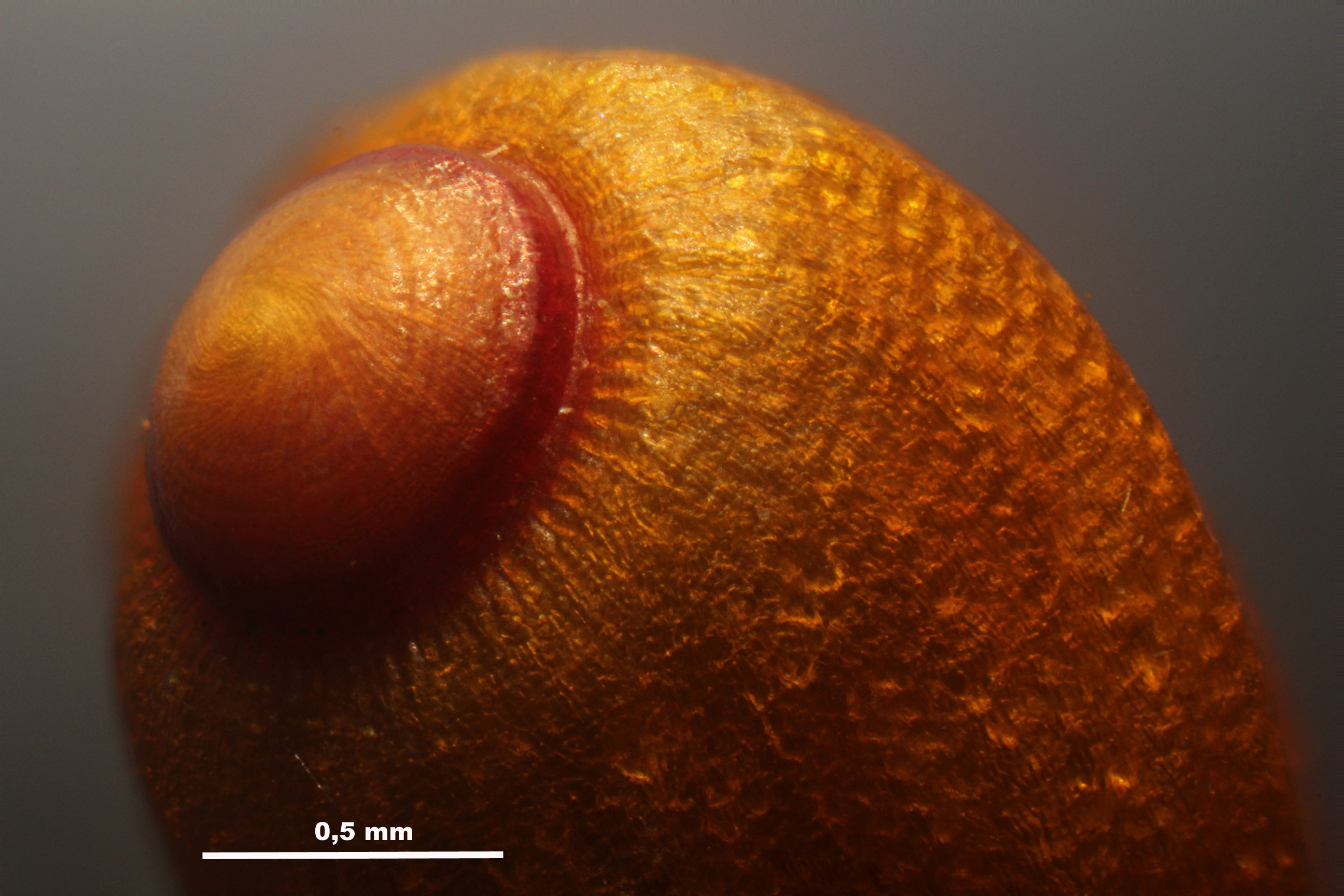
Tip of sporangium (capsule) showing the well-defined annulus of Funaria.

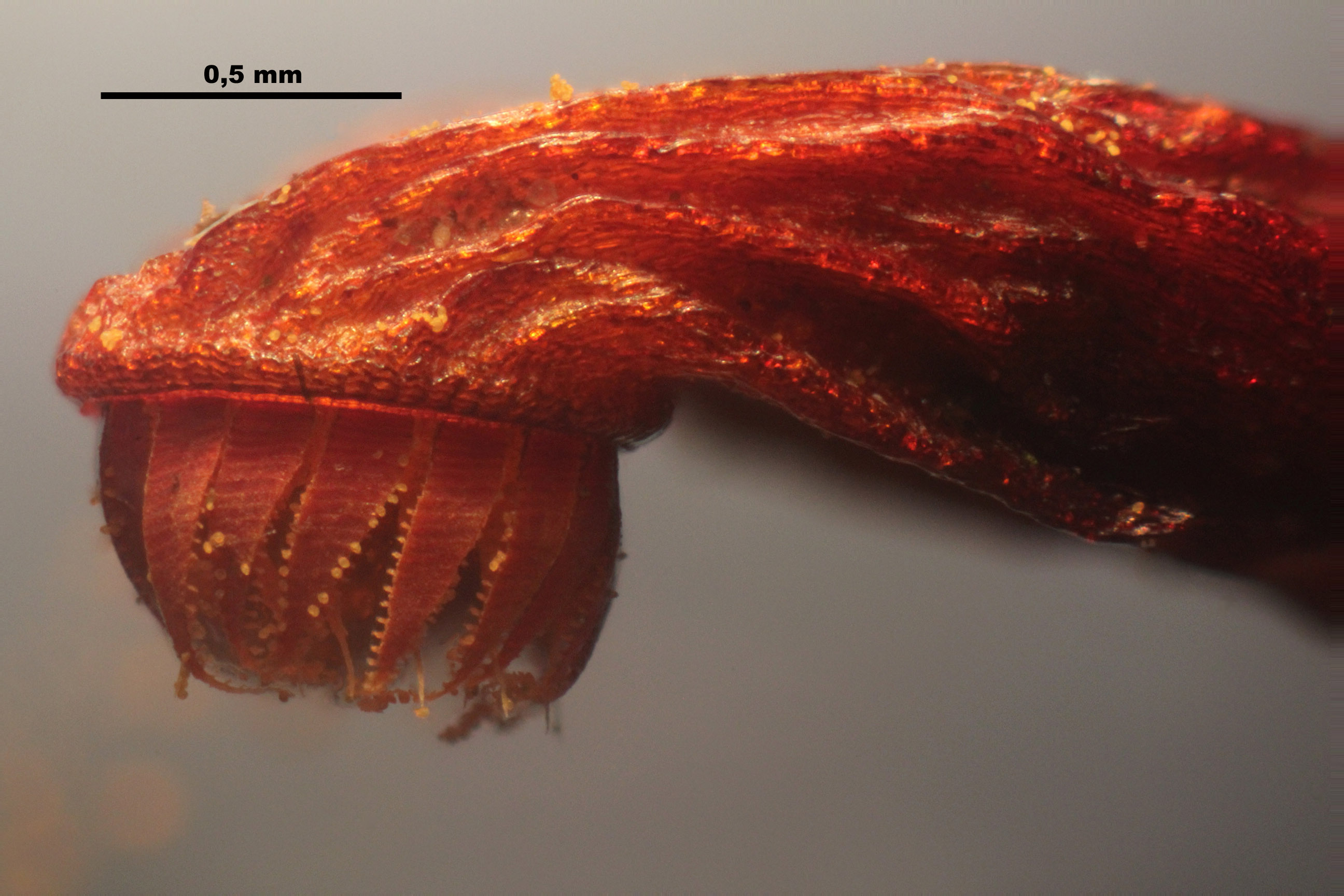
Sporangium after the annulus has released the operculum (lid), revealing the teeth of the peristome.

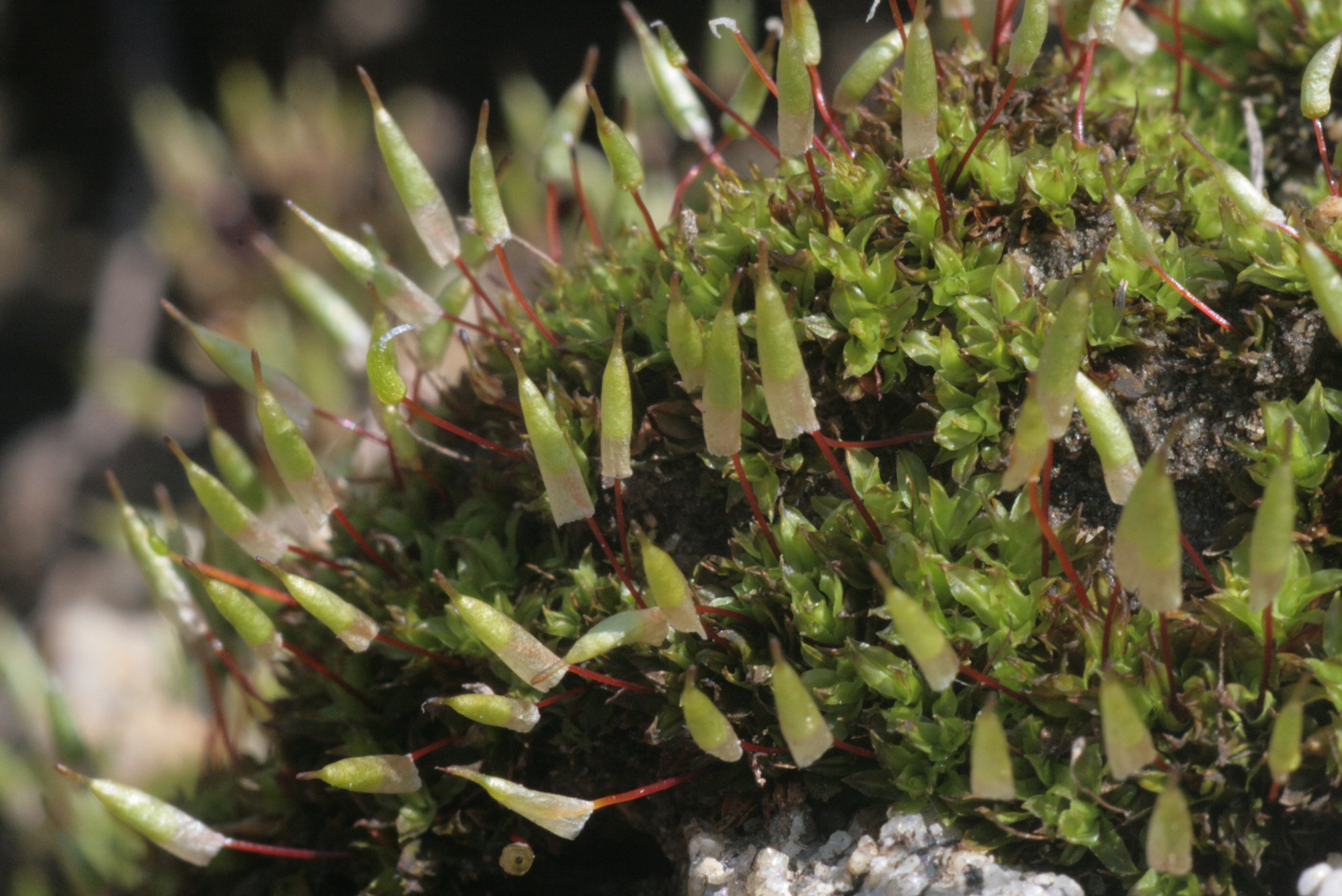
Sporophytes of Encalypta vulgaris, with their capsules still jacketed by calyptrae.
