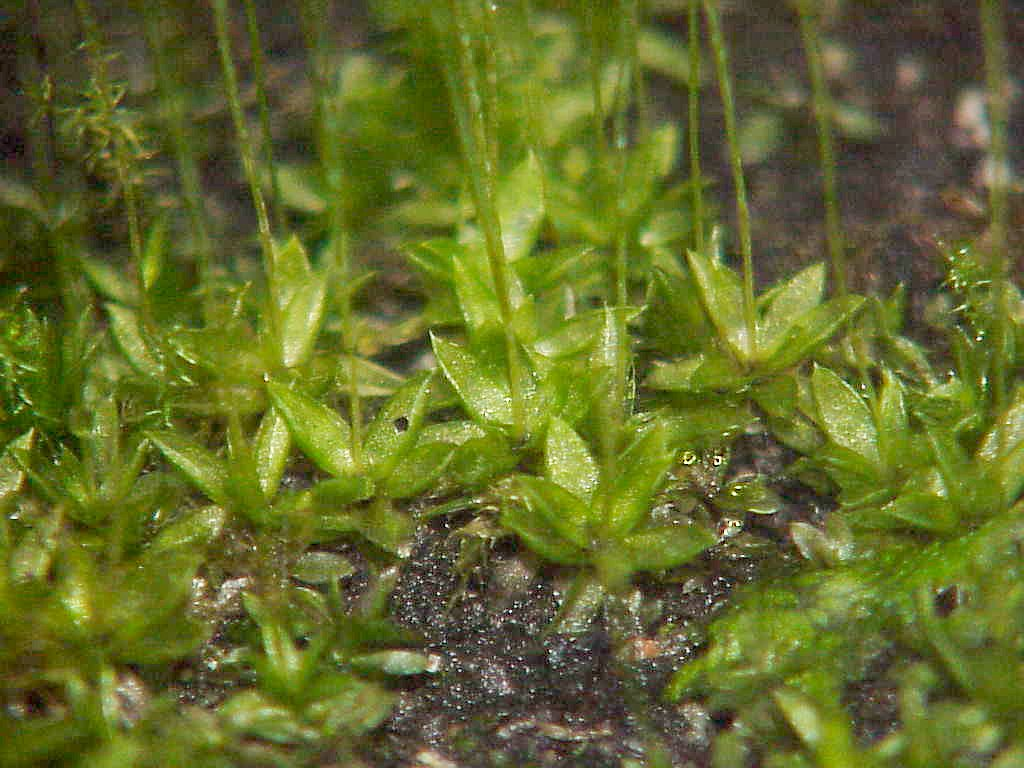
- Funaria hygrometrica

Scientific classification
- Kingdom: Plantae
- Division: Bryophyta
- Class: Bryopsida
- Subclass: Funariidae
- Order: Funariales; M. Fleisch.

Families
- Funariaceae

= Funariales =

Order of mosses

Funariales is an order containing 356 species, 26 genera and 7 families.

1. Gigaspermaceae
2. Funariaceae (ca. 300 species)
3. Disceliaceae
4. Oedipodiacea
5. Splachaceae
6. Ephemeraceae
7. Splachnobryaceae

The members are small, annual or biennial land mosses.

The family Disceliaceae and its only species, Discelium nudum, was formerly placed in this order, but is now placed in its own order, Disceliales.
