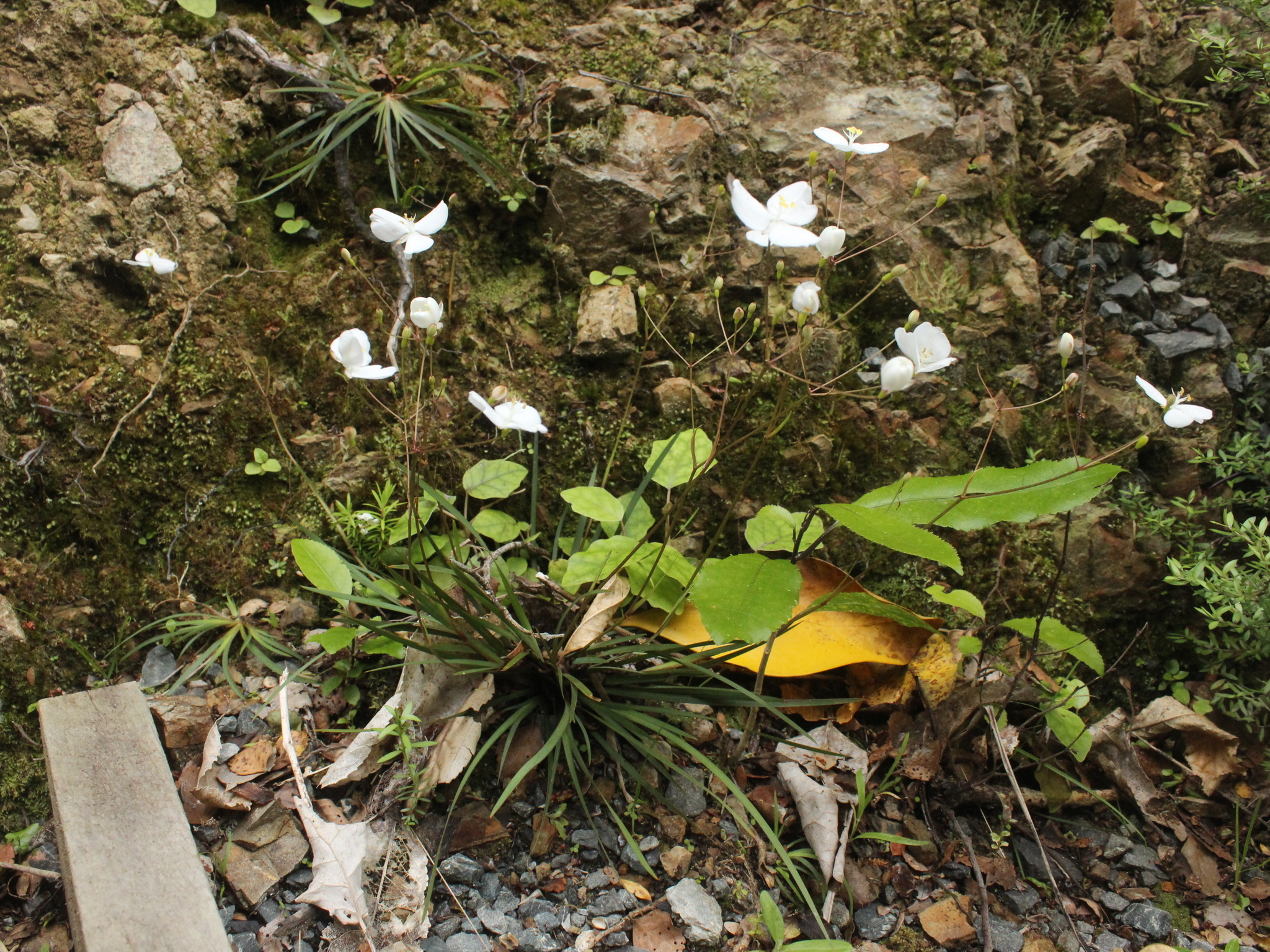

Conservation status
- Naturally Uncommon (NZ TCS)

Scientific classification
- Kingdom: Plantae
- Clade: Tracheophytes
- Clade: Angiosperms
- Clade: Monocots
- Order: Asparagales
- Family: Iridaceae
- Genus: Libertia
- Species: L. edgariae

Binomial name
- Libertia edgariae Blanchon, B.G.Murray & Braggins

= Libertia edgariae =

Species of plant

Libertia edgariae, also known as Edgar's iris or Edgar's mikoikoi, is a species of flowering plant in the family Iridaceae. The plant was first described by Dan Blanchon, Brian Grant Murray and John E. Braggins in 2002, and is endemic to New Zealand.

== Description ==
Libertia edgariae consists of leavy fans that emerge from horizontal stolons. The leaves measure between 120–620 mm (4.7–24.4 in) in length and are a green to pale yellow in colour, while the stolons are a pale yellow colour. The species can be differentiated from Libertia grandiflora due to the presence of falcate leaves, barrel-shaped capsules, elongate rhizomes, and by being smaller in scale. The species has white flowers. It can be distinguished from L. ixioides and L. grandiflora due to the leaves being significantly more flaccid, or due to its distinct flower shape.

== Taxonomy ==
The species was first described in 2002 by Dan Blanchon, Brian Grant Murray and John E. Braggins, during a revision of the genus Libertia. Specimens of the plant had been collected previously and were considered stoloniferous forms of Libertia grandiflora. The species was defined by phylogenetic analysis, chromosome numbers and morphological differences. Molecular data and shared traits suggest that the species may be a hybrid, originating from Libertia mooreae and Libertia peregrinans. The species epithet was chosen to honour New Zealand botanist Elizabeth Edgar.

== Distribution and habitat ==
The species is endemic to New Zealand, found in coastal scrub and on hillsides near Wellington and the western Wairarapa, including the Remutaka Ranges and Eastbourne Hills. The species is often found in scrubland alongside Leptospermum scoparium and Pteridium esculentum.

== Gallery ==
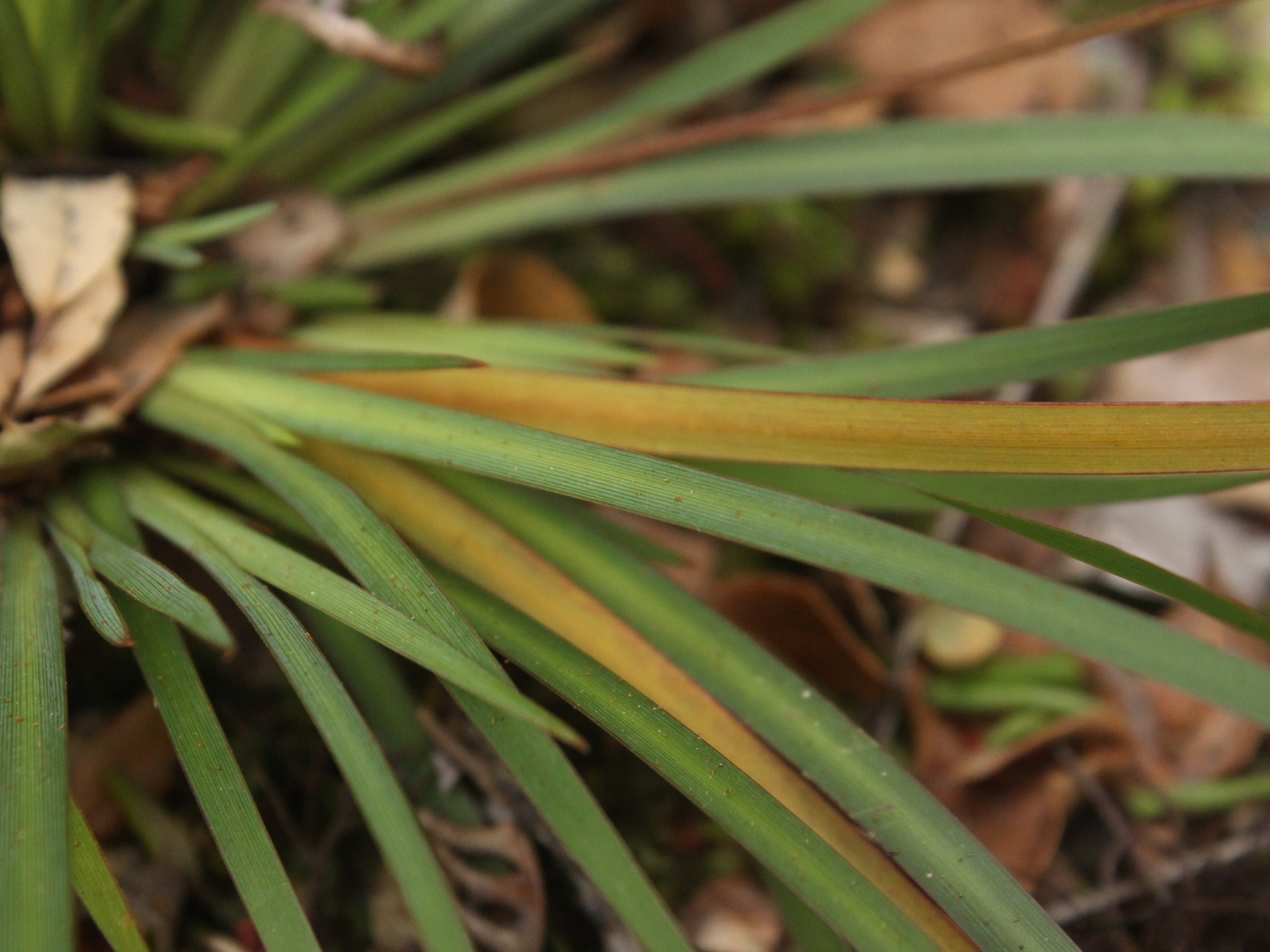
Leaves

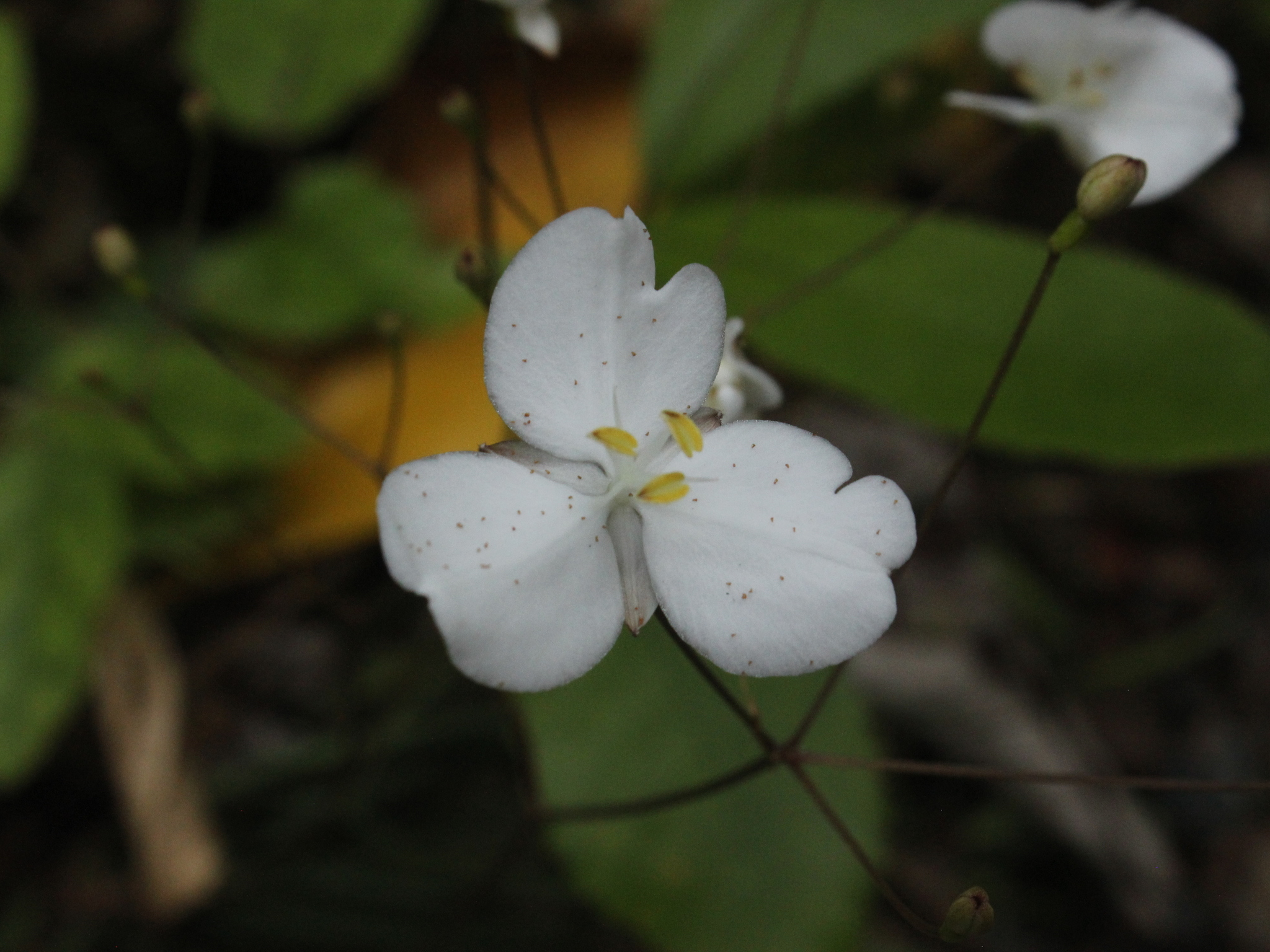
Flower

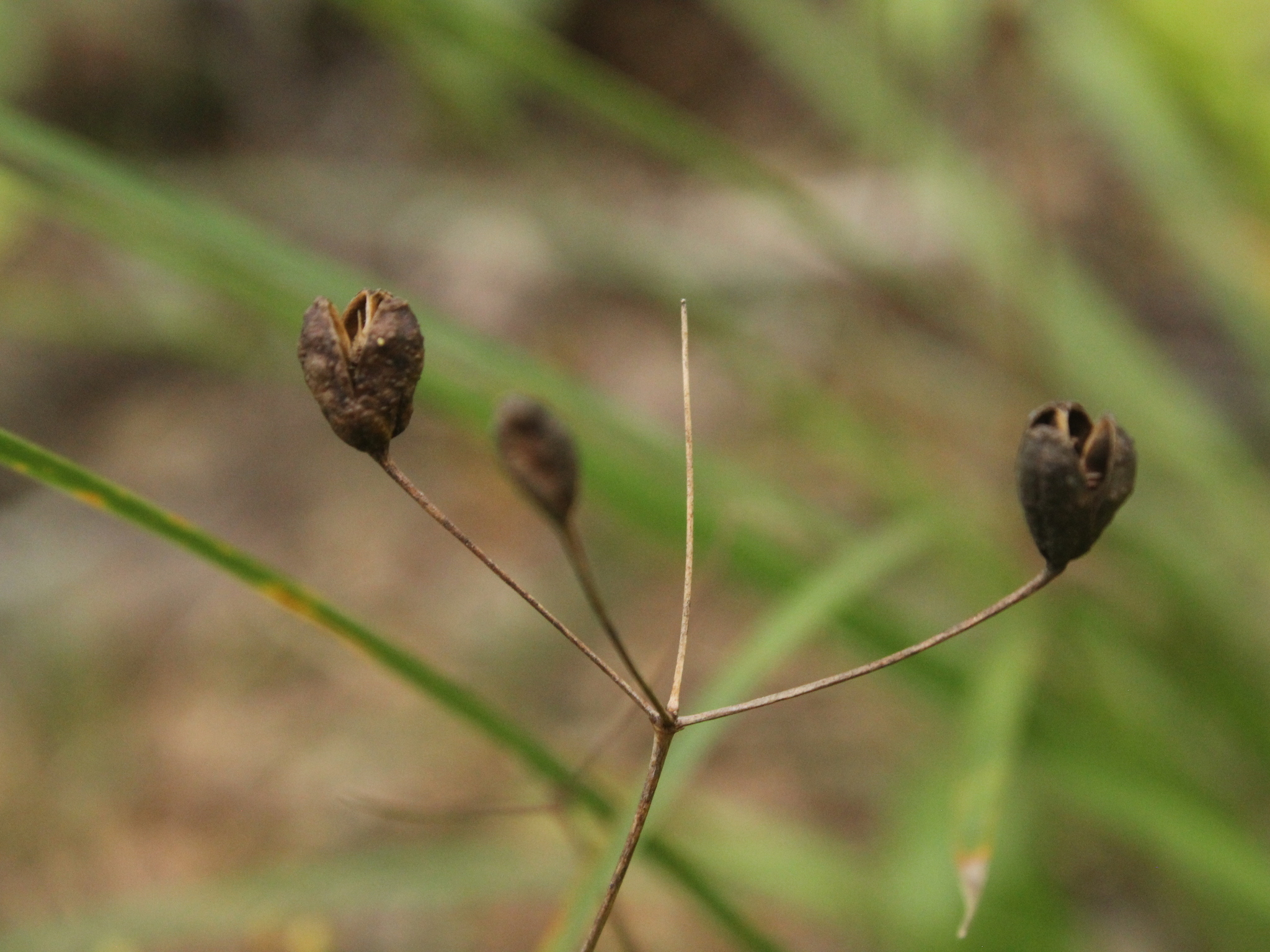
Seed capsules

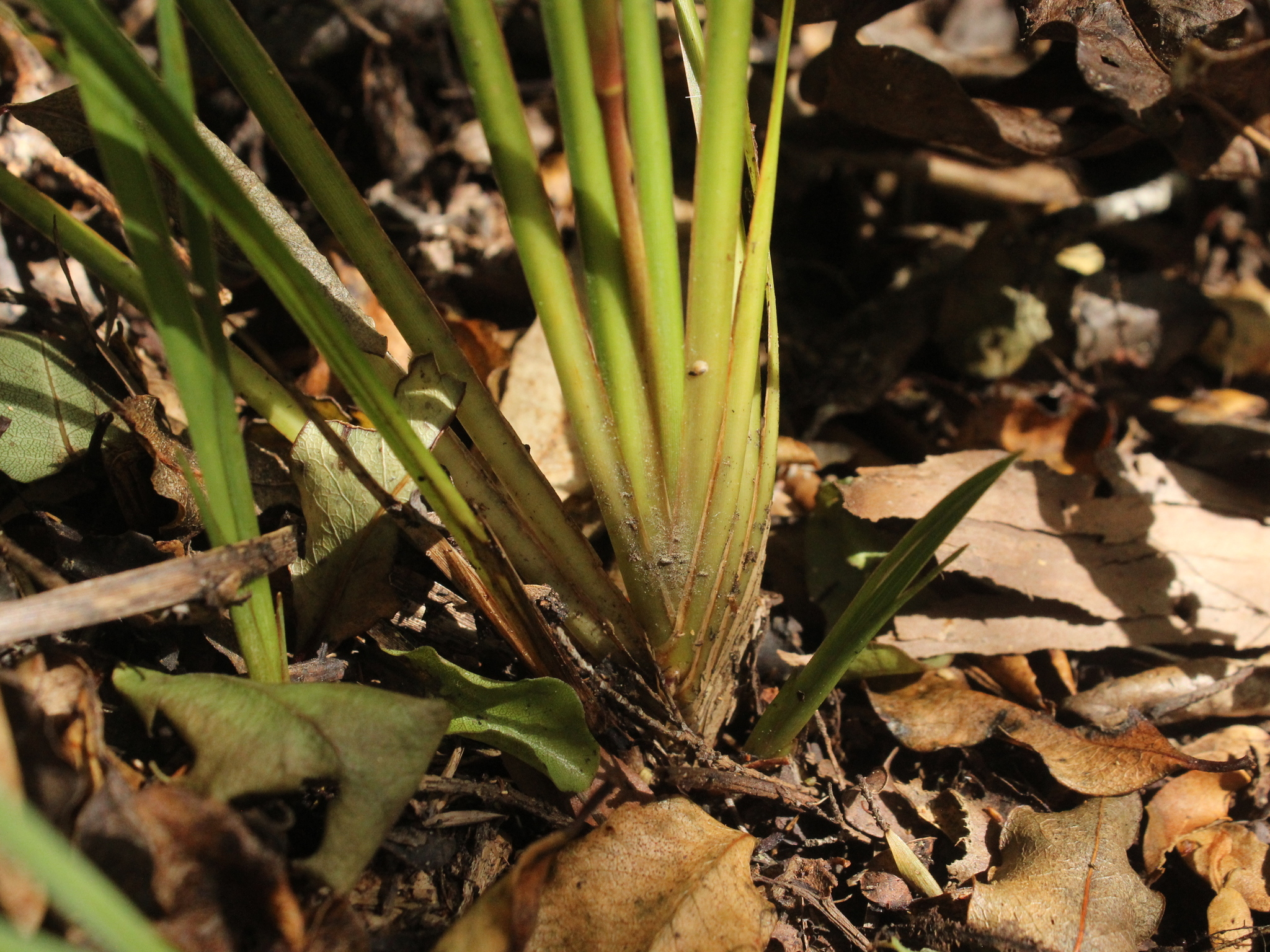
Base of plant
