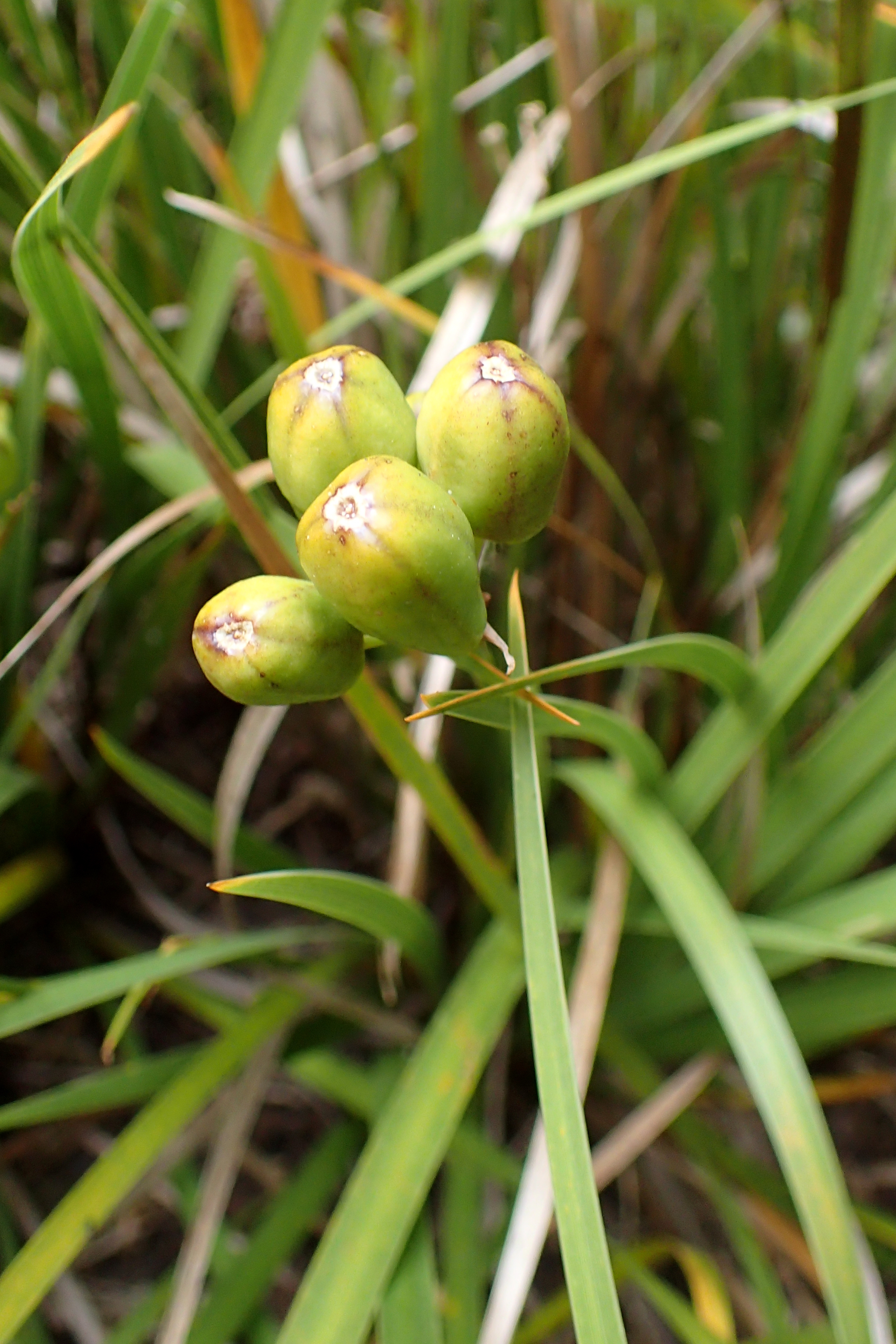
- Libertia cranwelliae at the Auckland Botanic Gardens

Scientific classification
- Kingdom: Plantae
- Clade: Tracheophytes
- Clade: Angiosperms
- Clade: Monocots
- Order: Asparagales
- Family: Iridaceae
- Genus: Libertia
- Species: L. cranwelliae

Binomial name
- Libertia cranwelliae Blanchon, B.G.Murray & Braggins, 2002

= Libertia cranwelliae =

Species of plant in New Zealand

Libertia cranwelliae is a species of flowering plant in the family Iridaceae. The plant was first described by Dan Blanchon, Brian Grant Murray and John E. Braggins in 2002, and is native to New Zealand.

== Etymology ==
The species was named after New Zealand botanist Lucy Cranwell.

== Taxonomy ==
The first known specimens of the plant were collected in 1824 and identified as Libertia ixioides. L. cranwelliae was identified as a distinct species in 2002 due to its elongated rhizomes, smaller ovaries, alongside DNA and molecular evidence.

== Description ==
Libertia cranwelliae consists of leafy fans that emerge from runners. Styloid crystals (Calcium oxalate) are found in the leaves of L. cranwelliae.

== Distribution and habitat ==
Libertia cranwelliae is endemic to New Zealand, known to only occur in the Awatere and Kōpuapounamu river valley areas of the East Cape of the North Island.
