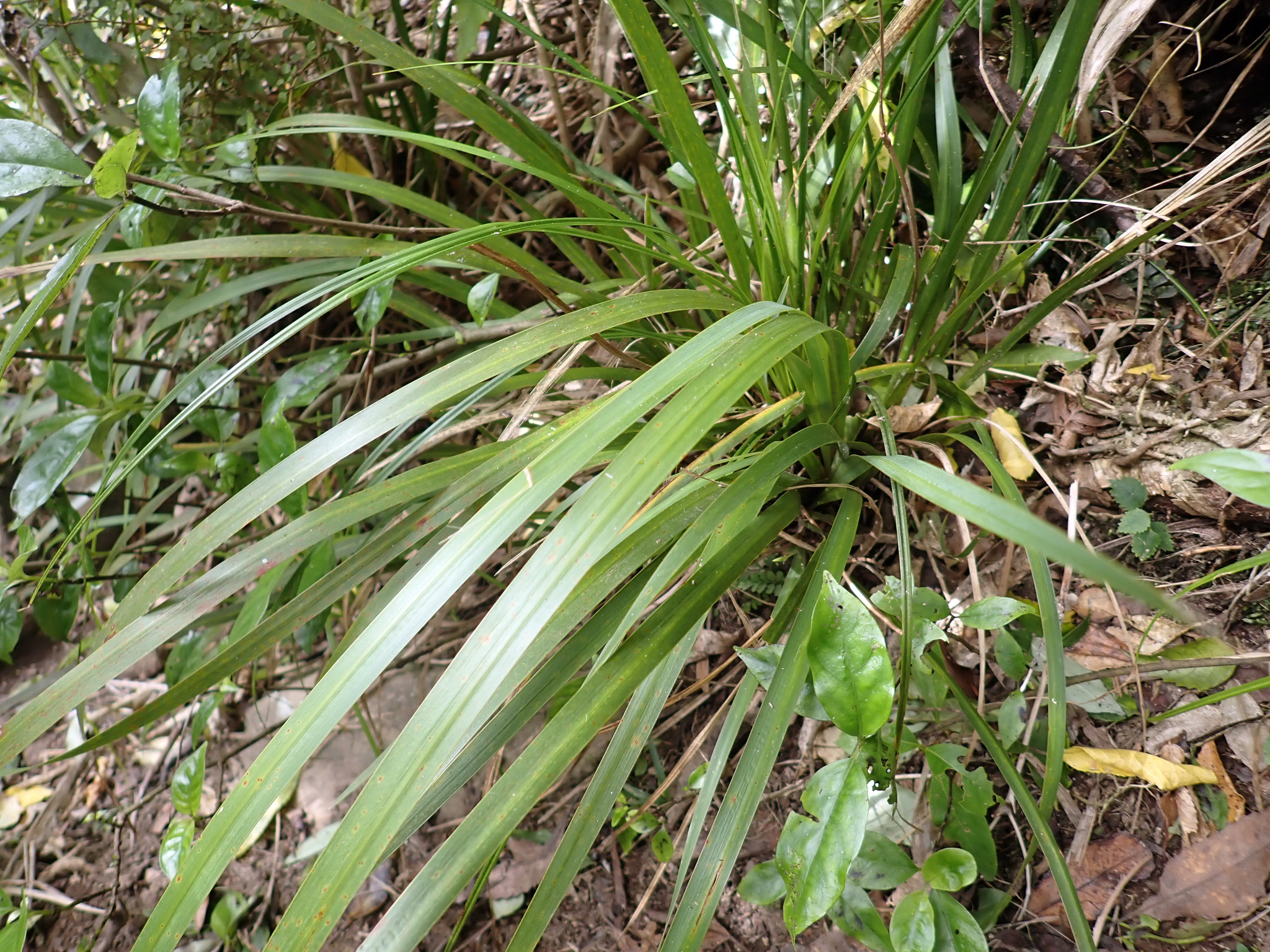

Conservation status
- Nationally Critical (NZ TCS)

Scientific classification
- Kingdom: Plantae
- Clade: Embryophytes
- Clade: Tracheophytes
- Clade: Spermatophytes
- Clade: Angiosperms
- Clade: Monocots
- Order: Asparagales
- Family: Iridaceae
- Genus: Libertia
- Species: L. flaccidifolia

Binomial name
- Libertia flaccidifolia Blanchon & J.S.Weaver
- Known native range

= Libertia flaccidifolia =

Species of plant

Libertia flaccidifolia is a species of flowering plant in the family Iridaceae. The plant was first described by Dan Blanchon and J.S. Weaver in 2009, and is thought to be endemic to northern Rodney in the Auckland Region, New Zealand.

== Taxonomy ==
The species was formally described after specimens of the plants were discovered on Mount Tamahunga in January 2006. The earliest known herbarium specimen was collected by Lucy Moore in 1961 from Mount Tamahunga. Dan Blanchon and J.S. Weaver named the species flaccidifolia, referencing the droopy leaves of the species not seen in other similar Libertia species of New Zealand. Before being formally described, the species was referred to as Libertia aff. ixioides.

== Description ==
Libertia flaccidifolia consists of closely bunched leaves that arise from rhizomes. The species has broad, flaccid leaves, and has white and yellow flowers that appear between September and November. The species can be distinguished from L. ixioides and L. grandiflora due to the leaves being significantly more flaccid, or due to its distinct flower shape.

== Distribution and habitat ==
The species is endemic to New Zealand. Originally thought to be endemic to Mount Tamahunga, further specimens of the plan have been found across the northern Rodney area of the Auckland Region, New Zealand. L. flaccidifolia is one of the few plants endemic to the Auckland Region.

The species is typically found in mixed forest or shrubland 300 m (980 ft) above sea level or higher, along ridge lines or clay banks.

== Gallery ==
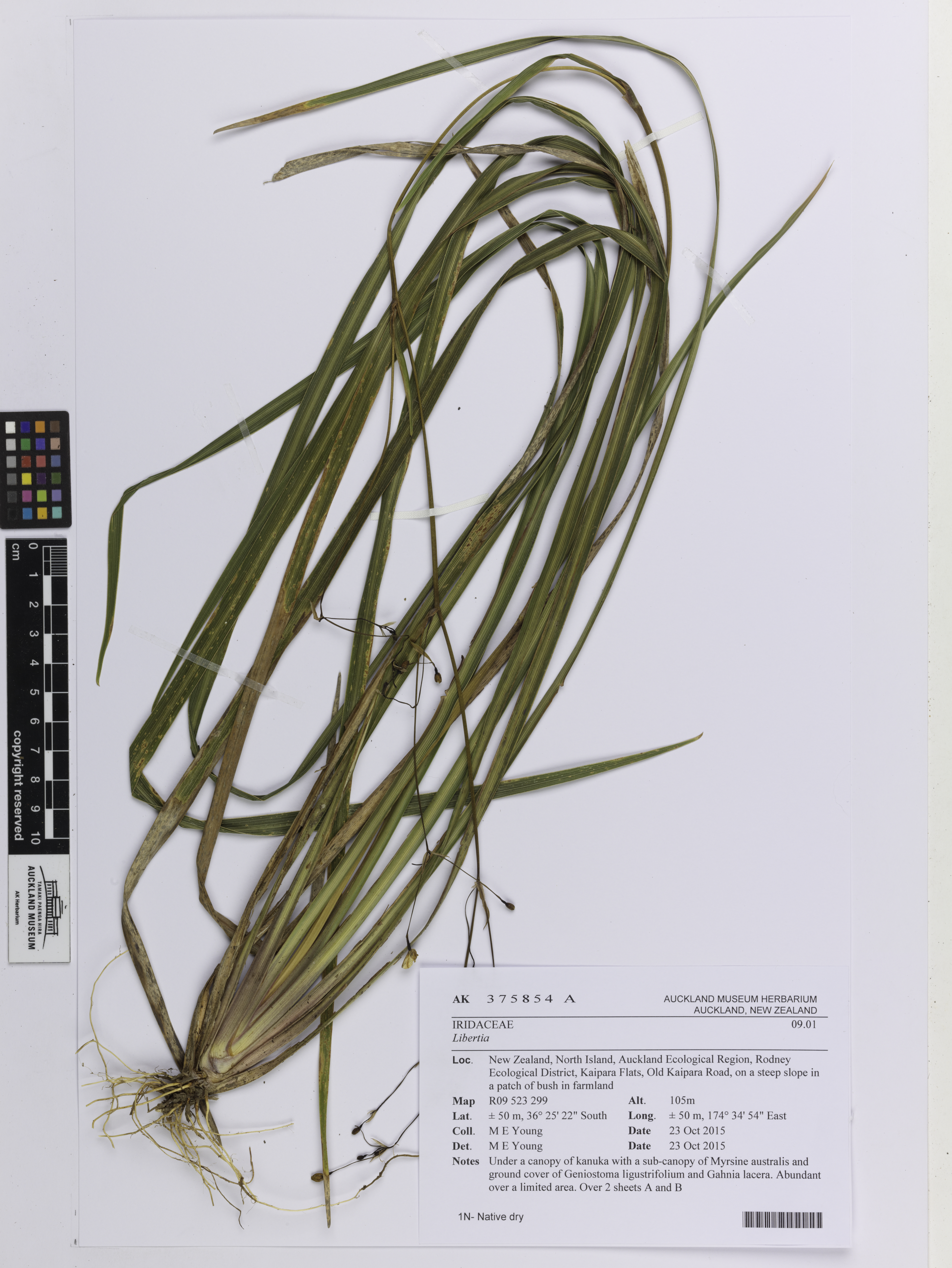
Specimen from the herbarium of the Auckland War Memorial Museum

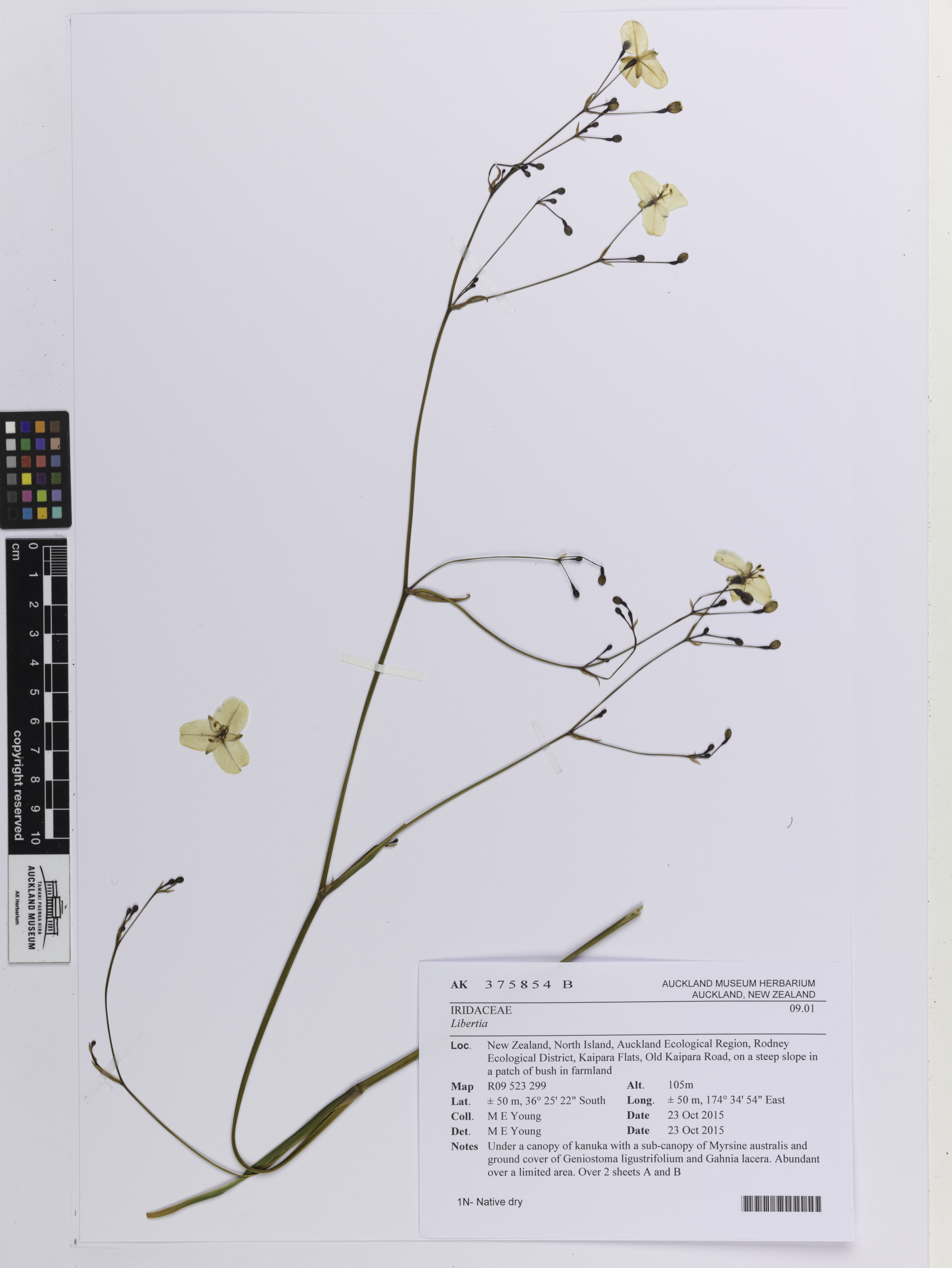
Specimen from the herbarium of the Auckland War Memorial Museum

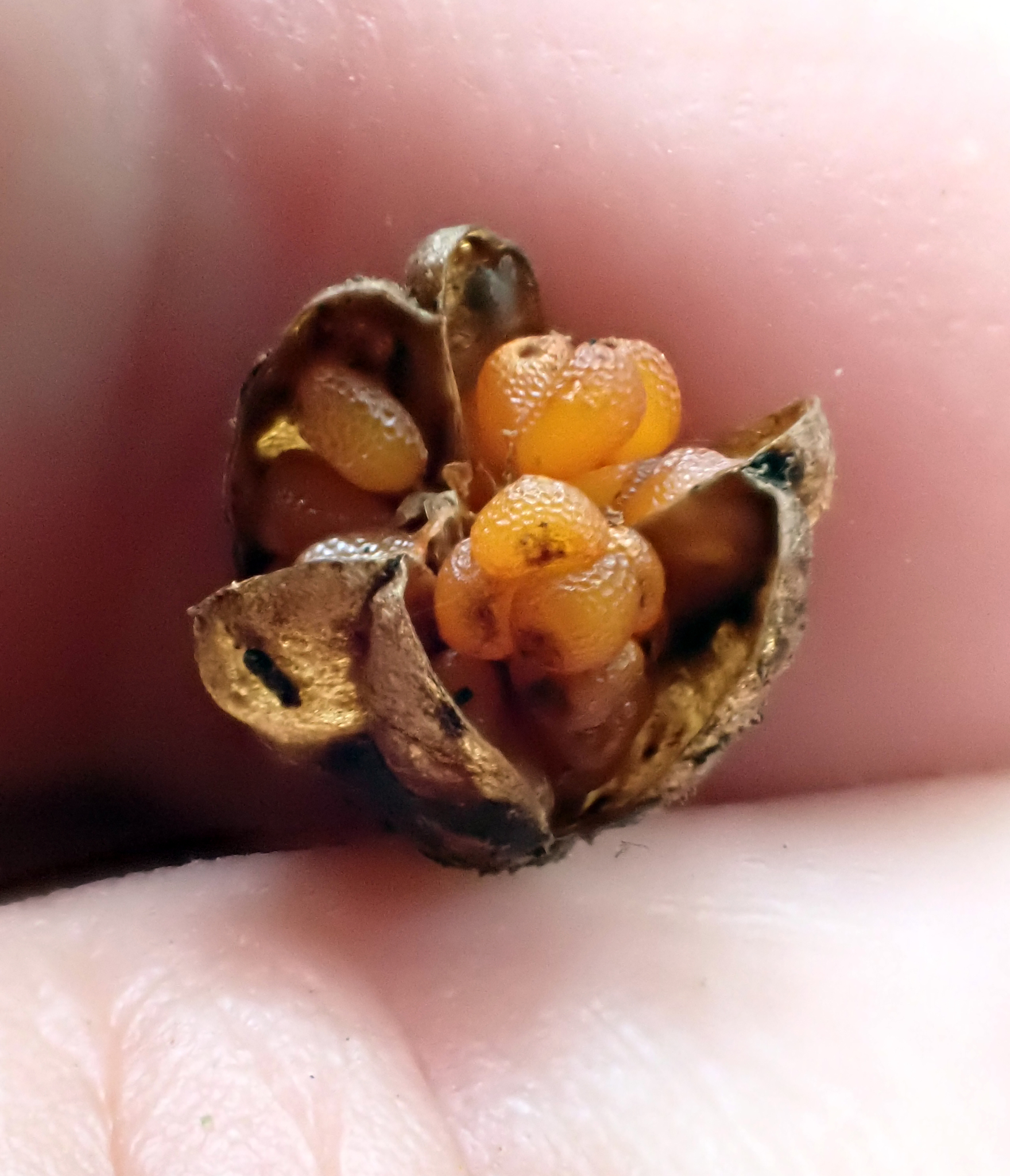
Fruit of Libertia flaccidifolia

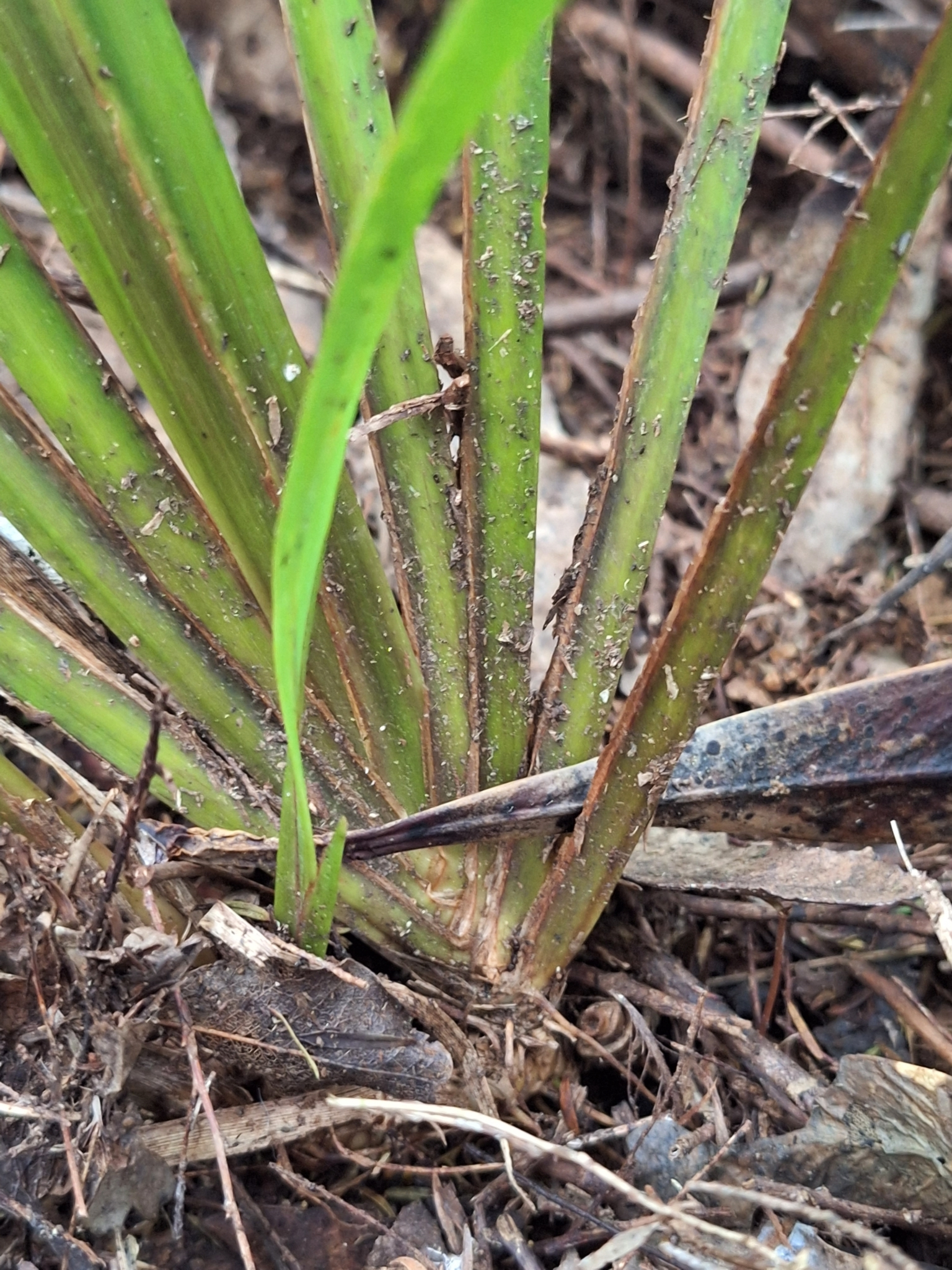
Leaves arizing from the rhyzome of Libertia flaccidifolia

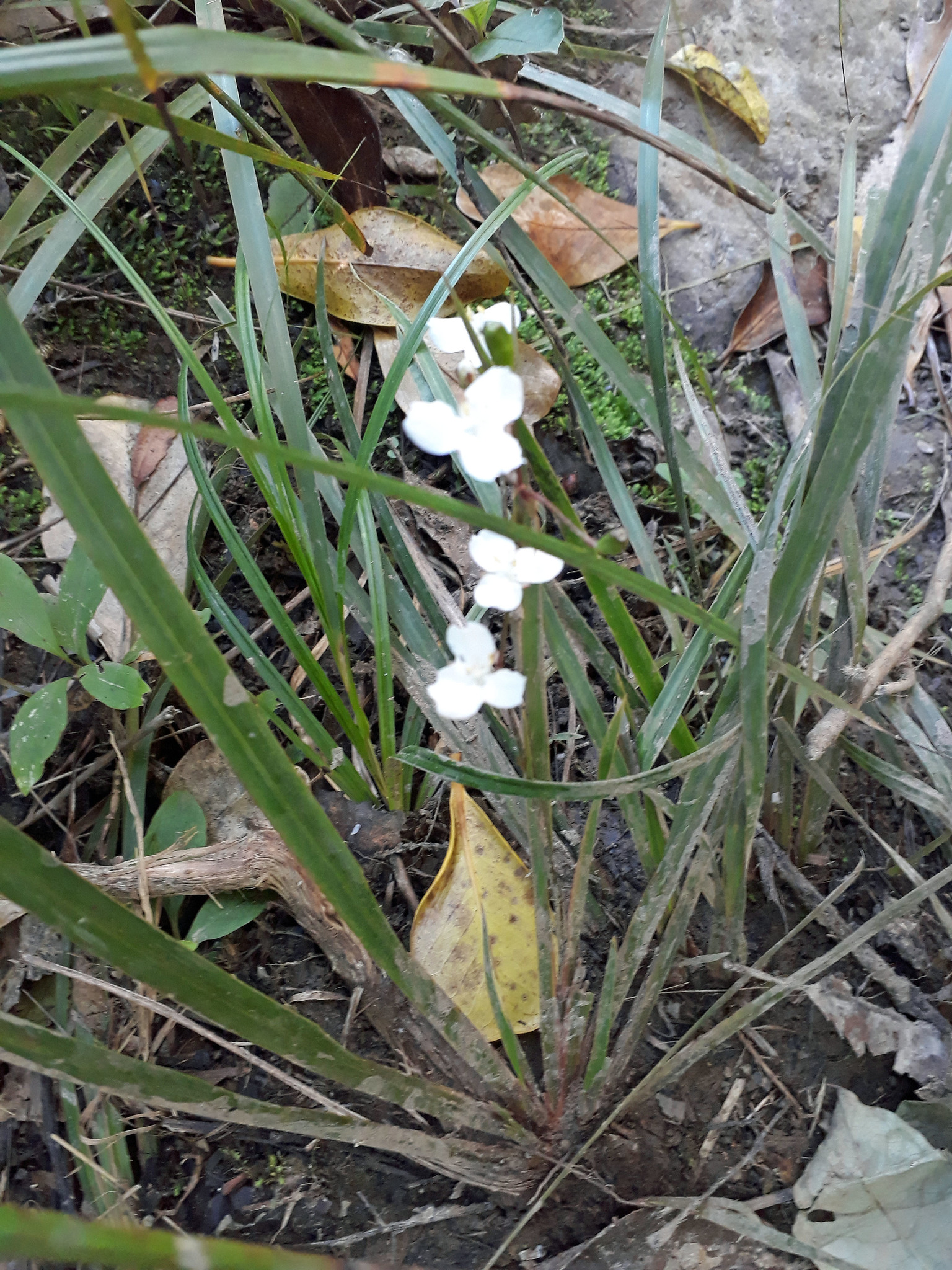
Libertia flaccidifolia in bloom
