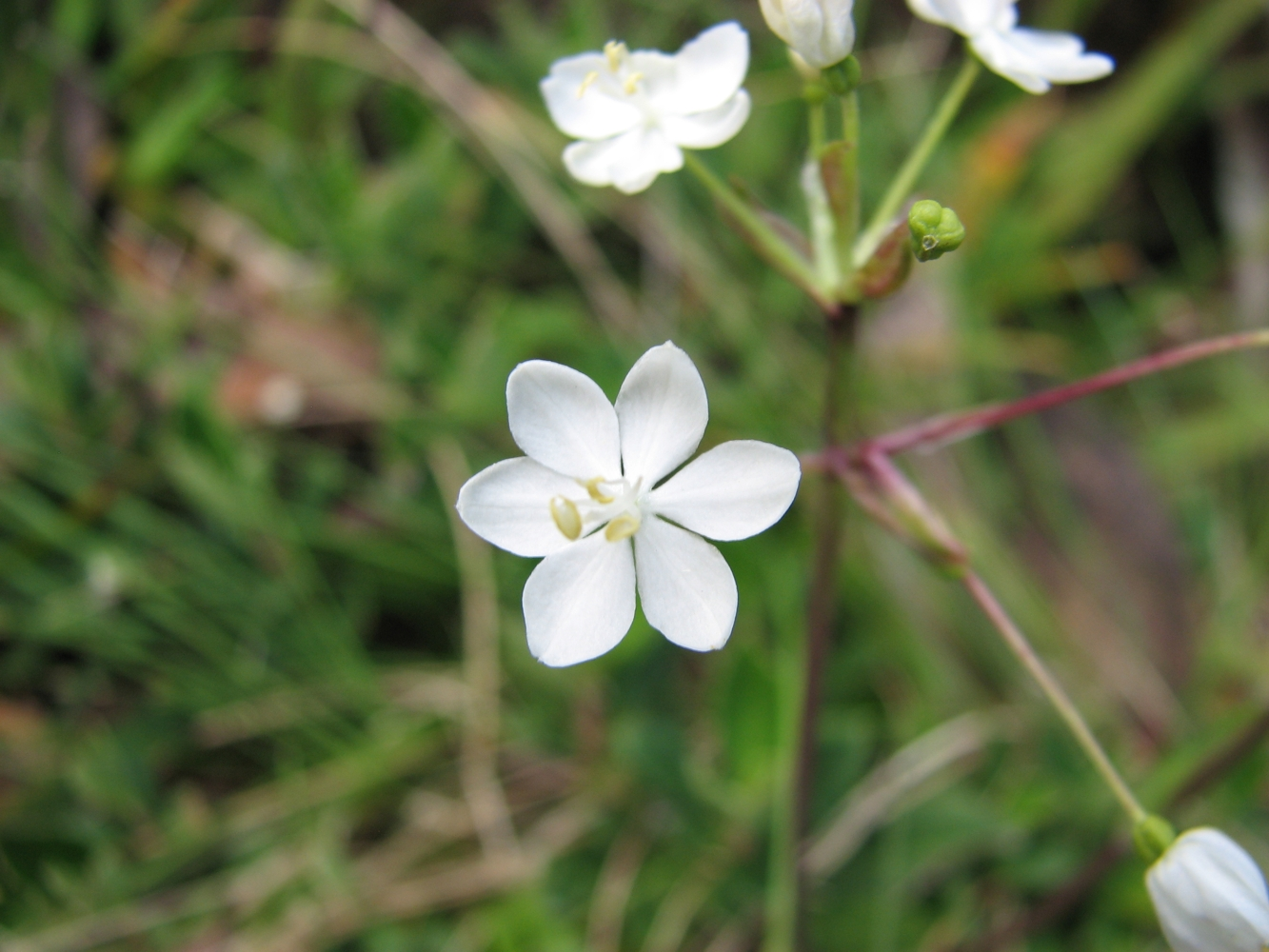
- Libertia pulchella, Mount Baw Baw, Victoria, Australia

Scientific classification
- Kingdom: Plantae
- Clade: Tracheophytes
- Clade: Angiosperms
- Clade: Monocots
- Order: Asparagales
- Family: Iridaceae
- Genus: Libertia
- Species: L. pulchella

Binomial name
- Libertia pulchella (R.Br.) Spreng.

Synonyms
- Libertia lawrencei orth. var. Hook.f.; Libertia pulchella var. laurencei (Hook.f.) Domin; Libertia laurencei Hook.f.; Nematostigma pulchellum (R.Br.) A.Dietr.; Renealmia pulchella R.Br.; Sisyrinchium pulchellum R.Br. nom. inval.; Sisyrinchium pulchellum (R.Br.) R.Br. ex F.Muell.; Tekel pulchella (R.Br.) Kuntze; Tekelia pulchella orth. var. Kuntze

= Libertia pulchella =

Species of flowering plant

Libertia pulchella, the pretty grass-flag, is a plant in the iris family (Iridaceae). It is native to Papua New Guinea, New Zealand and Australia, where it occurs in New South Wales and Victoria and Tasmania. The flowering scape rises above the linear leaves producing 3 to 6 cream-coloured flowers.
