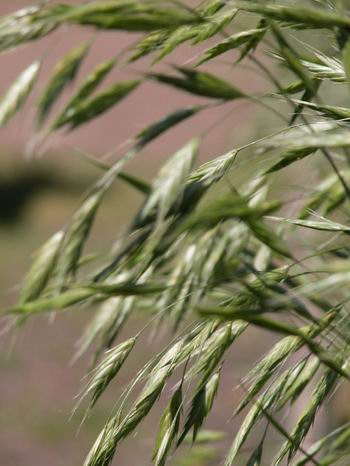
- Inflorescence

Conservation status
- Extinct in the Wild (IUCN 3.1)

Scientific classification
- Kingdom: Plantae
- Clade: Tracheophytes
- Clade: Angiosperms
- Clade: Monocots
- Clade: Commelinids
- Order: Poales
- Family: Poaceae
- Subfamily: Pooideae
- Genus: Bromus
- Species: B. bromoideus

Binomial name
- Bromus bromoideus (Lej.) Crep.

Synonyms
- Bromus arduennensis Dumort. Bromus grossus subsp. eburonensis (Nyman) Tournay

= Bromus bromoideus =

Species of grass

Bromus bromoideus, the brome of the Ardennes, is a species of grass in the genus Bromus. Genetic studies suggest that it rather should be regarded as a variant of Bromus secalinus.

It was found in the calcareous meadows of the provinces of Liège and Luxembourg in Belgium, notably around the towns of Rochefort, Beauraing and Comblain-au-Pont, where it was first discovered in 1821. It was thought to be extinct since the 1930s until preserved seeds were rediscovered in collections of the Belgian National Botanic Garden by the English botanist David Aplin and as a result of the publicity, seeds in other locations came to light in 2005.

In 2009 the National Botanic Garden of Belgium announced that some hundred thousand seeds have been germinated.

== Habitat and distribution ==
Bromus bromoideus was endemic to a limited geographical area spanning southern Belgium and northern France. Unlike many plant species, B. bromoideus had no known natural habitat outside of agricultural settings. It was exclusively found in cultivated fields, primarily those used for growing spelt (Triticum spelta), a hulled wheat variety that was once widely cultivated in the region.

The species' natural range was confined to the Meuse district, with an extent of occurrence approximately 90 km in length and 10–15 km in width. Within this limited area, the plant showed a distinct preference for specific soil conditions, growing predominantly on poor dry calcareous soils, particularly clay-limestone or clay-schistose soils located on hills and hilltops.

Historical records indicate that B. bromoideus was commonly found in spelt fields until 1882, after which its populations began to decline. This close association with spelt cultivation is believed to have been reinforced by a synchronization between the vegetative requirements of the grass and the conditions offered by spelt agriculture. The grass was frequently observed growing in the seed line of spelt crops, suggesting it was inadvertently sown alongside the cereal.

A distinctive feature of B. bromoideus' distribution pattern was its nearly exclusive association with spelt fields. With only one documented exception, the species was never observed growing in wheat or rye fields. This specificity likely relates to differences in seed characteristics between these crops; spelt has hulled grains that remain in thick glumes after threshing, producing diaspores similar in size to those of B. bromoideus, allowing the grass seeds to remain mixed with spelt during traditional harvesting and sowing processes.

At its peak distribution in the 19th century, the species was recorded in 49 locations across southeastern Belgium and one location in northern France. By the 1930s, agricultural modernization had severely reduced its range, with the last wild specimen documented in 1935.

== Taxonomy ==
Bromus bromoideus has a complex taxonomic history with its status being subject to debate among botanists. The species shows clear genetic affinities with closely related brome grasses, particularly Bromus grossus and Bromus secalinus, leading to different interpretations of its taxonomic rank. Tournay (1968) proposed that B. bromoideus should be classified as a subspecies of B. grossus rather than a distinct species. This view was partially supported by Scholz (1970), who went further and suggested that B. bromoideus represents merely a mutant form of B. grossus. In contrast, Smith (1973) argued for maintaining its species status, emphasizing that its unique marginal lemma tooth serves as a distinctive identifying characteristic that clearly separates it from other members of the genus.

Molecular studies have provided additional insights into these relationships. Research by Ainouche and Bayer (1997) using internal transcribed spacer (ITS) sequencing revealed that B. bromoideus, B. grossus, and B. secalinus share identical ITS sequences, supporting their close evolutionary relationship. These findings align with Jauzein's (1995) assessment that B. bromoideus likely originated as a variant of B. grossus through an accidental mutation.

More recent genetic analysis using AFLP (amplified fragment length polymorphism) markers has further clarified these relationships. Koch and colleagues (2016) confirmed that B. bromoideus evolved from within the B. grossus gene pool, suggesting a relatively recent divergence. Despite this close genetic relationship, experimental hybridization work by de Cugnac demonstrated that when B. bromoideus and B. grossus were crossed, they produced B. bromoideus var. villosa (characterized by pubescent spikelets), but the defining morphological characteristics of B. bromoideus remained stable through generations of cultivation.

The most likely wild relatives of the species are considered to be B. commutatus and/or B. racemosus, which occur in less artificial habitats such as fallow land and wet meadows, respectively.
