= Alexandre Louis Simon Lejeune =

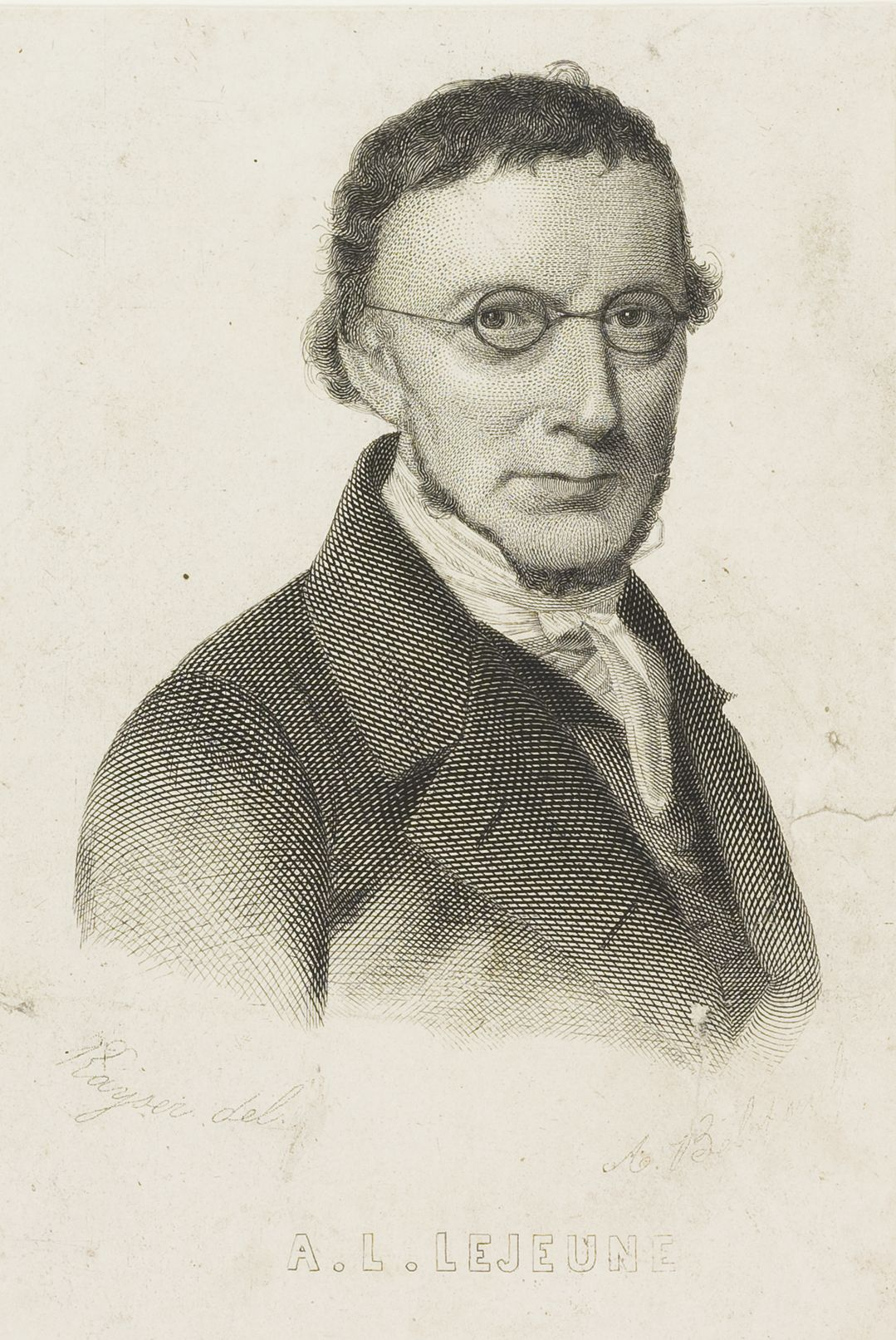
Alexandre Louis Simon Lejeune (1779–1838)

Alexandre Louis Simon Lejeune (23 December 1779 in Verviers – 28 December 1858 in Verviers) was a medical doctor and botanist.

In 1801 he entered the school of medicine in Paris, but was subsequently forced to abandon his studies due to military conscription. After finishing his military duties in late 1804, he relocated to Ensival as a physician. Three years later, he settled permanently in his hometown of Verviers.

With Richard Courtois (1806–1835), he was co-author of "Compendium florae belgicae". He was a mentor to Marie-Anne Libert, who he introduced to Augustin Pyramis de Candolle. Libert named the genus Lejeunea (family Lejeuneaceae) in Lejeune's honor in 1820.

== Botanical works ==
- Flore des environs de Spa, 1811 - Flora native to the environs of Spa.
- Revue de la flore des environs de Spa, 1824 - Review of flora native to the environs of Spa.
- De Libertia, novo graminum genere, Commentatio 1825 - On the genus Libertia.
- Compendium florae belgicae (with Richard Courtois); Leodii, Apud P. J. Collardin, 1828–1836 - Compendium of Belgian flora.
- Together with Pierre-Joseph Michel he published the exsiccata series Agrostologie Belgique, ou Herbier des graminées, des cypéracées et des oncées qui croissent spontanément dans la Belgique, ou qui y sont cultivées (1823-1825).
