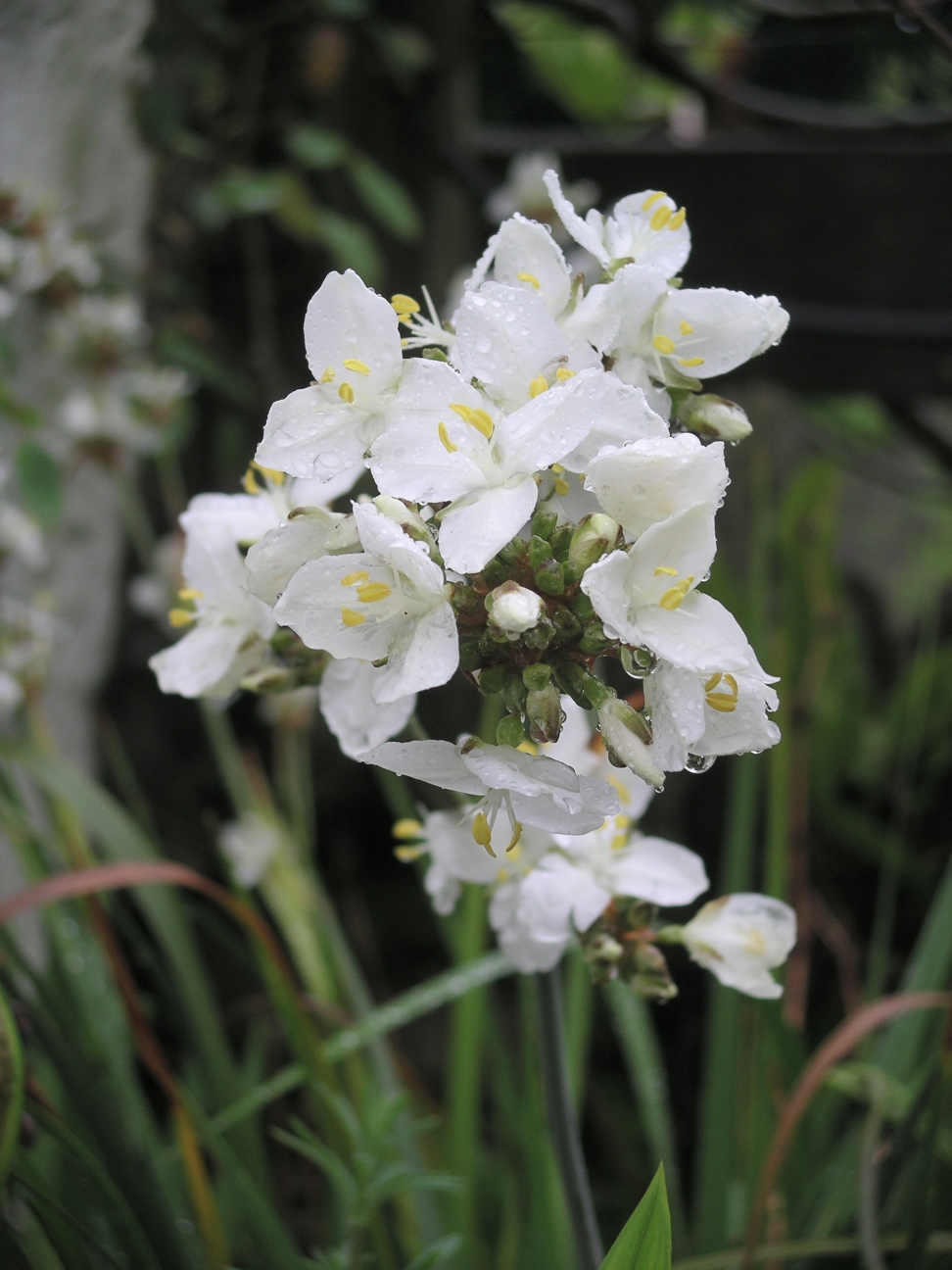
- Libertia grandiflora

Scientific classification
- Kingdom: Plantae
- Clade: Tracheophytes
- Clade: Angiosperms
- Clade: Monocots
- Order: Asparagales
- Family: Iridaceae
- Subfamily: Iridoideae
- Tribe: Sisyrinchieae
- Genus: Libertia; Spreng. 1824, conserved name not Dumort. 1822 (syn of Hosta) nor Lej. 1825 (syn of Bromus)

Type species
- Libertia ixioides (Forster f.) Spreng.

Synonyms
- Tekel Adans.; Tekelia Scop.; Renealmia R.Br. 1810 not L. 1753 nor L.f. 1782; Nematostigma A.Dietr.; Orthrosanthus Sweet; Taumastos Raf.; Choeradodia Herb.; Ezeria Raf.

= Libertia =

Genus of flowering plants

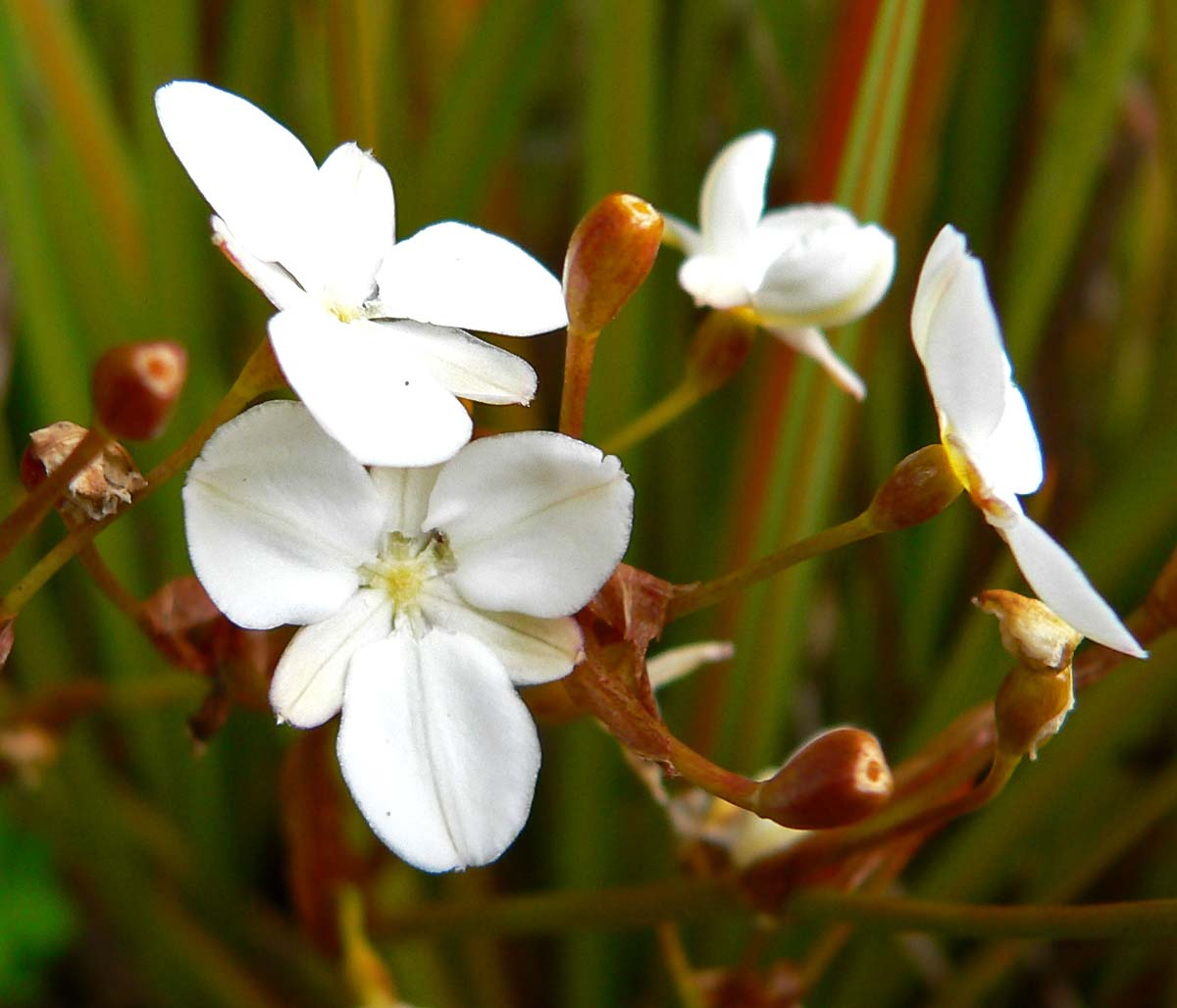
Libertia peregrinans

Libertia is a genus of monocotyledonous plants in the family Iridaceae, first described as a genus in 1824. It is native to South America, Australia, New Guinea, and New Zealand. Eight species are endemic to New Zealand.

Libertia is made up of herbaceous or evergreen perennials growing from short rhizomes, with simple, linear or narrowly lanceolate basal leaves which are often green but may be red, orange, or yellow under direct sunlight. The showy white or blue trimerous flowers are open in spring and are followed by capsules opening by three valves which contain the numerous seeds.

The genus was named after the Belgian botanist Marie-Anne Libert (1782–1865) (also referred to as Anne-Marie Libert).

The species Libertia chilensis has gained the Royal Horticultural Society's Award of Garden Merit.

Species

- Libertia chilensis (Molina) Gunckel – central + southern Chile, southern Argentina, Juan Fernández Islands
- Libertia colombiana R.C.Foster – Colombia, Ecuador, Peru, Bolivia
- Libertia cranwelliae Blanchon, B.G.Murray & Braggins – North Island of New Zealand
- Libertia edgariae Blanchon, B.G.Murray & Braggins – North Island of New Zealand
- Libertia falcata Ravenna – Los Lagos region of Chile
- Libertia flaccidifolia Blanchon & J.S.Weaver – North Island of New Zealand
- Libertia grandiflora (R.Br.) Sweet – North + South Islands of New Zealand
- Libertia insignis Ravenna – Los Lagos region of Chile
- Libertia ixioides (G.Forst.) Spreng. – North + South Islands of New Zealand
- Libertia micrantha A.Cunn. – North + South Islands of New Zealand
- Libertia mooreae Blanchon, B.G.Murray & Braggins – North + South Islands of New Zealand
- Libertia paniculata (R.Br.) Spreng. – eastern Australia – branching grass flag
- Libertia peregrinans Cockayne & Allan – North + South + Chatham Islands of New Zealand
- Libertia pulchella (R.Br.) Spreng. – New South Wales, Victoria, Tasmania, North + South Islands of New Zealand, New Guinea
- Libertia sessiliflora (Poepp.) Skottsb. – central Chile
- Libertia tricocca Phil. – central + southern Chile
- Libertia umbellata Ravenna – Los Lagos region of Chile

Selected formerly included

Numerous names have been coined using the name Libertia, referring to species that are now regarded as better suited to other genera (Bromus, Cardiocrinum, Hosta, Orthrosanthus).

- Libertia arduennensis – Bromus bromoideus
- Libertia arundinacea – Bromus bromoideus
- Libertia azurea – Orthrosanthus multiflorus
- Libertia cernua – Hosta plantaginea
- Libertia graminea – Orthrosanthus laxus var. gramineus
- Libertia heteroclita – Cardiocrinum cordatum
- Libertia laxa – Orthrosanthus laxus
- Libertia recta – Hosta ventricosa
- Libertia stricta – Orthrosanthus multiflorus

== Cytology ==
Libertia has a high rate of polyploidy, with 9/11 of assessed species confirmed as polyploid and only 3 confirmed as diploid. This is not unprecedented, with polyploidy being a common feature in the tribe Sisyrinchieae. The uniform base number of x=19 is, however, defining within the tribe. This base number is not found elsewhere in the tribe and only Diplarrhena and Solenomelus have uniform base numbers intragenerically.

All New Zealand endemic species of Libertia are diploid, hexaploid or dodecaploid, while these levels of ploidy have not been found outside New Zealand. Polyploidy is more prevalent in New Zealand species across all botanical taxa and this has been attributed as a relic of glacial refugia during glacial maximums.

Distribution	Species	Ploidy Level	Chromosomal Count	Contention
South American	L. chilensis	4x (6x)	76 (72, 114)	Due to numerous issues with this study, authors found the sample, identified as Libertia ixioides (New Zealand endemic) but collected from Chile, to have 72 chromosomes present. This was most likely a misidentification of Libertia chilensis, with a further error in counting. Samples from the Juan Fernandez Islands were found to have 114 chromosomes, in comparison to the 76 found on the mainland.
South American	L. colombiana	No data available.	No data available.	
New Zealand endemic	L. cranwelliae	12x	228	
New Zealand endemic	L. edgariae	6x	114	
South American	L. falcata	No data available.	No data available.	
New Zealand endemic	L. flaccidifolia	12x	228	
New Zealand endemic	L. grandiflora	6x	114 (228, 230)	The 228/230 chromosome specimen was likely Libertia flaccidifolia, before the 2009 naming by Blanchon and Weaver.
South American	L. insignis	No data available.	No data available.	
New Zealand endemic	L. ixioides	12x	228 (220–230, 230)	Due to the difficulty in counting chromosomes, authors found between 220 and 230 chromosomes in different counts, with 228 being the average count.
New Zealand endemic	L. micrantha	2x	38	
New Zealand endemic	L. mooreae	6x	114	
Australian	L. paniculata	4x	76	
New Zealand endemic	L. peregrinans	6x	114	
Australasia	L. pulchella	2x	38	
South American	L. sessiliflora	2x	38	
South American	L. tricocca	No data available.	No data available.	
South American	L. umbellata	No data available.	No data available.	
