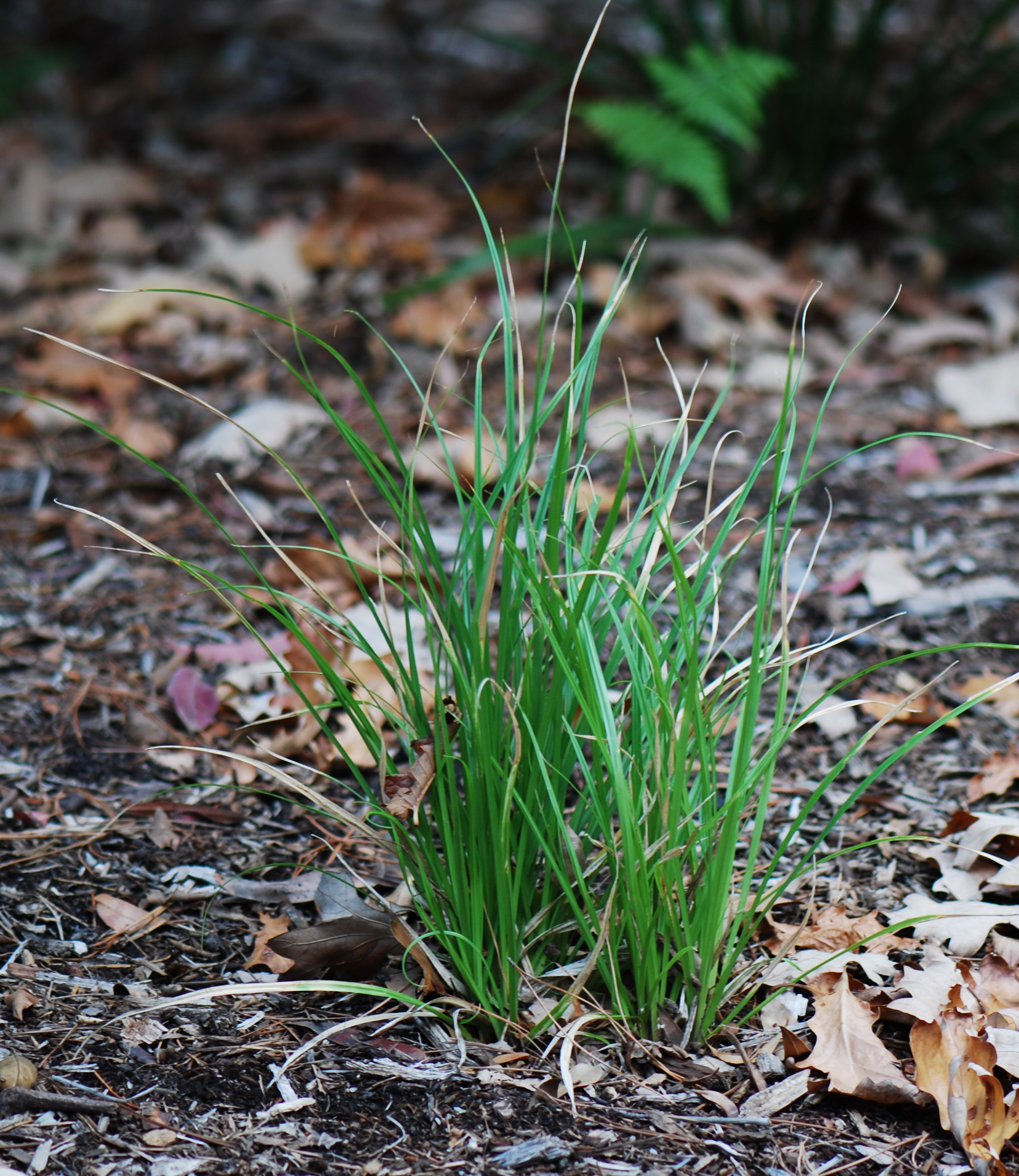

Scientific classification
- Kingdom: Plantae
- Clade: Tracheophytes
- Clade: Angiosperms
- Clade: Monocots
- Order: Asparagales
- Family: Iridaceae
- Genus: Libertia
- Species: L. paniculata

Binomial name
- Libertia paniculata (R.Br.) Spreng.

Synonyms
- Renealmia paniculata R.Br.; Nematostigma paniculatum (R.Br.) A.Dietr.; Sisyrinchium paniculatum (R.Br.) R.Br. ex F.Muell.; Tekel paniculata (R.Br.) Kuntze; Sisyrinchium paniculatum R.Br.

= Libertia paniculata =

Species of flowering plant

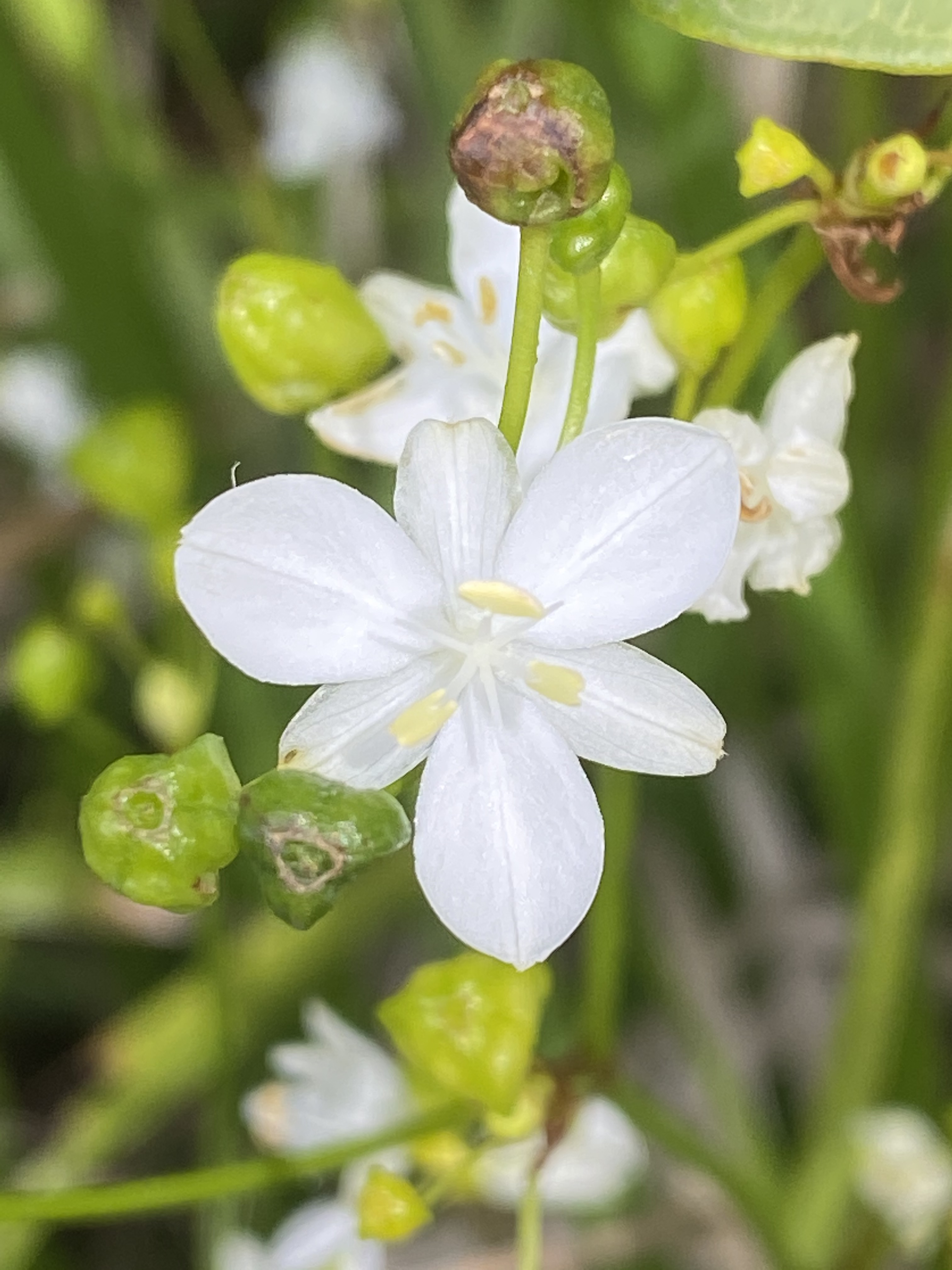
Flower

Libertia paniculata is a plant in the family Iridaceae. It is endemic to Australia, where it occurs in Queensland, New South Wales and Victoria.
