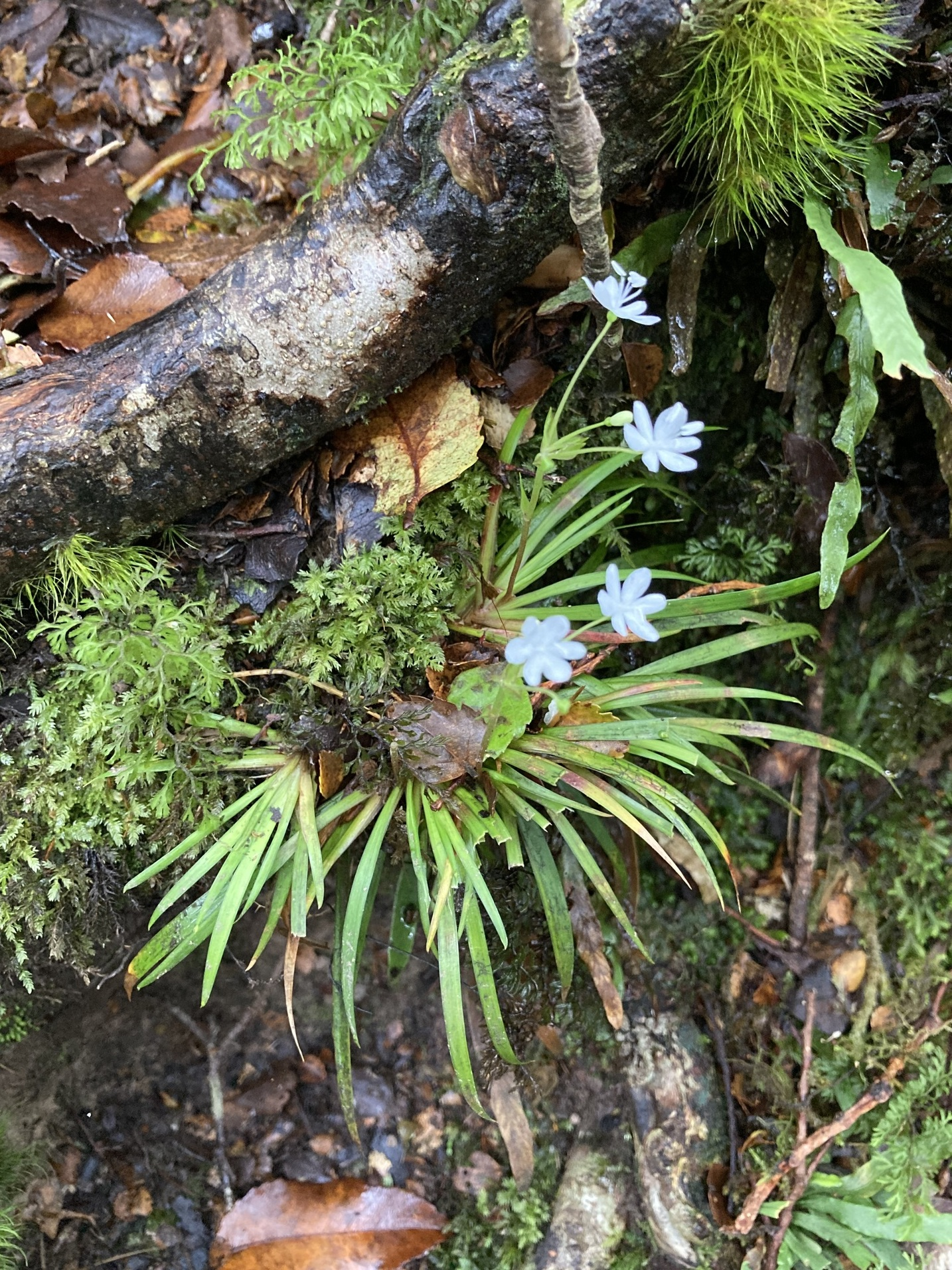
- A Libertia micrantha specimen

Conservation status
- Not Threatened (NZ TCS)

Scientific classification
- Kingdom: Plantae
- Clade: Tracheophytes
- Clade: Angiosperms
- Clade: Monocots
- Order: Asparagales
- Family: Iridaceae
- Genus: Libertia
- Species: L. micrantha

Binomial name
- Libertia micrantha A.Cunn.

= Libertia micrantha =

Species of flowering plant

Libertia micrantha, commonly known as mikoikoi and the native iris, is a species of flowering plant in the family Iridaceae. It is endemic to New Zealand; its range covers the North and South Islands. A perennial herb, L. micrantha inhabits montane forests in high rainfall areas and river banks. It was first described in 1837 by the British botanist Allan Cunningham. The specific epithet, micrantha, simply means 'tiny flower'.

== Description ==
Libertia micrantha is a species of perennial herb in the family Iridaceae and the subfamily Iridoideae. It reaches 200 millimetres (8 inches) in height. Its leaves reach 30–220 × 1–5 mm long. Its margins are often finely rough (scabrid) in texture. The inflorescences (flower clusters) are long, and the peduncles are slender. Each panicle has 1 to 8 white flowers with slender pedicels. Its bracts are 5–35 mm long.

Flowers are 5–15 mm in diameter and white in colour. Its stamens are found at the base, with anthers about 1.5 mm long. Fruits are 2–3 × 2–5 mm long, initially green then splitting open. Its seeds are yellow, 0.75–1.0 × 1.0–1.2 mm long, and rounded to egg-shaped in character.

== Taxonomy ==
The Libertia genus was first established in 1824 by the German botanist Kurt Polycarp Joachim Sprengel. L. micrantha was first described in 1837 by the British botanist Allan Cunningham. In her 1967 revision, Lucy Moore considered that there were insufficient differences between L. micrantha and L. pulchella, therefore L. micrantha was reduced to a synonym of L. pulchella. However, L. micrantha is considered to be the accepted taxnomic placement of the species after a revision of the genus was conducted in 2002. In 1952, Lucy Cranwell studied the pollination of various New Zealand plant species; in her study, she mentioned Libertia pollen provides no strong similarity with any other species.

=== Evolution ===
Goldblatt et al. (2008) hypothesised, based on DNA sequencing analysis data, that Orthrosanthus appears to be the most closely related genus to Libertia. The lineage, consisting of Libertia and Orthrosanthus, appears to have split from other groups around twenty-seven million years ago, with Libertia and Orthrosanthus (or their respective ancestors) diverging from each other in the Early Miocene, likely around twenty-two million years ago. A 1980 analysis by D. C. Mildenhall of Libertia pollen from the Mid Miocene in New Zealand also supports the estimated divergence time for the genus.

=== Etymology ===
The etymology (word origin) of L. micrantha's genus name, Libertia, is named in honour of the Belgian botanist and writer Marie-Anne Libert. The specific epithet (second part of the scientific name), micrantha, means 'tiny flower'. The species is commonly known as mikoikoi and native iris.

== Distribution ==
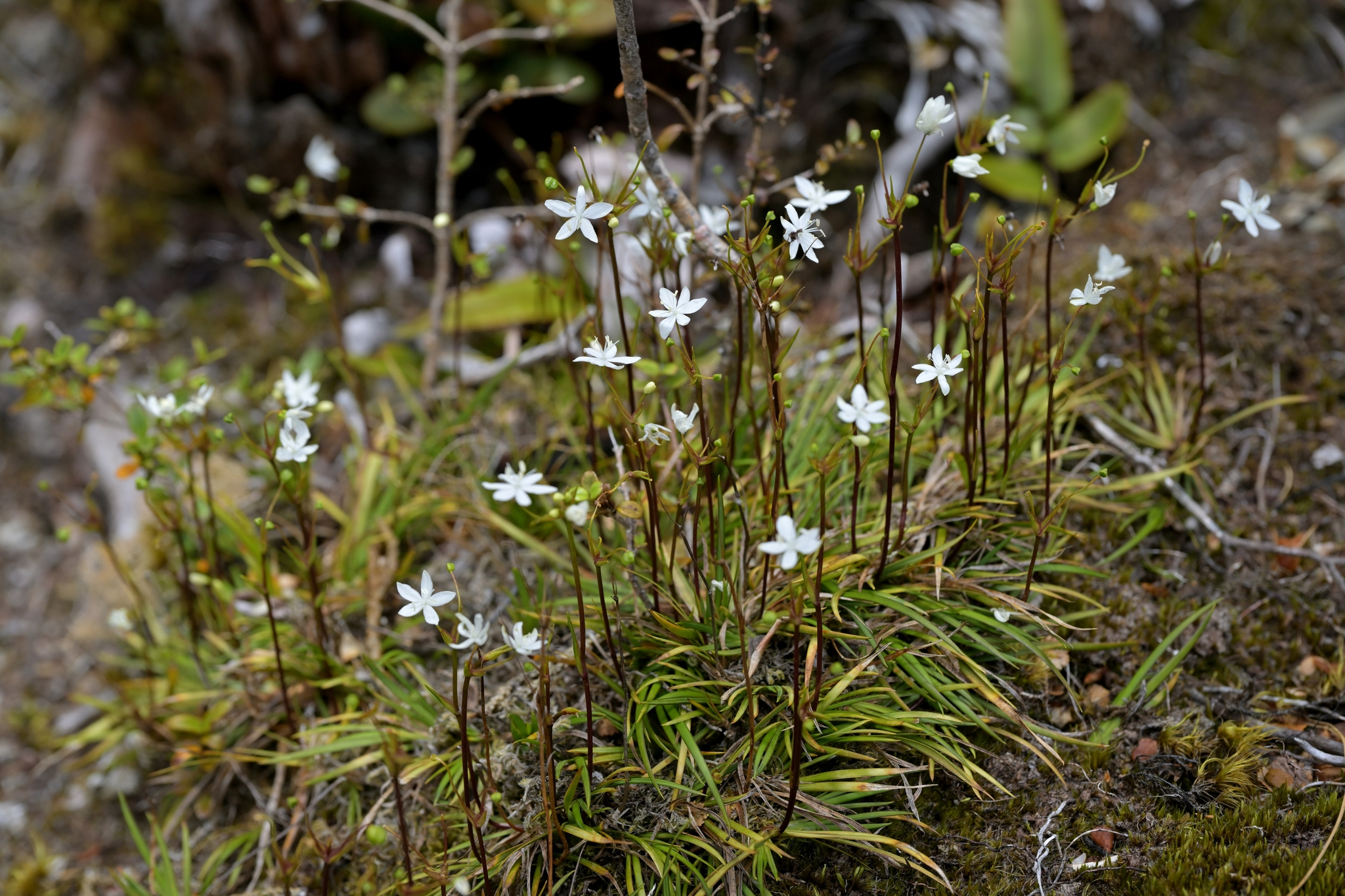
L. micrantha in its natural habitat

Libertia micrantha is endemic to New Zealand. Its range covers the North and South Islands. In the North Island, the species is widespread on mountain ranges from Mangōnui (in Northland) to Wellington. In the South Island, the species primarily occurs in the western side of the island, from Nelson and Marlborough to Fiordland. It does not naturally occur on Stewart Island, and appears to be uncommon in the eastern side of the South Island. L. micrantha's 2023 assessment in the New Zealand Threat Classification System was "Not Threatened".

=== Habitat ===
Libertia micrantha is typically found in high rainfall upland forests and near river banks, favouring montane environments and cooler places in lowland forests. It is typically found on root mounds, fallen logs, and is commonly associated with mosses and liverworts. It commonly coincides with various endemic New Zealand plants, such as Dacrydium cupressinum and Leptospermum scoparium.

== Ecology ==
Libertia species are pollinated by insects, and its seeds are likely dispersed by the wind.

== Works cited ==
Books

- Cheeseman, T. F. (1906). Manual of the New Zealand flora (1 ed.). Wellington, New Zealand: New Zealand Board of Science and Art.
- Cranwell, Lucy May (1952). New Zealand pollen studies: the monocotyledons: a comparative account. Auckland, New Zealand: Harvard University Press.
- Gledhill, David (2008). The Names of Plants. Cambridge, United Kingdom: Cambridge University Press. ISBN 978-0-521-68553-5.

Journals

- Bernardello, Gabriel; Anderson, Gregory J.; Stuessy, Tod F.; Crawford, Daniel J. (2001). "A survey of floral traits, breeding systems, floral visitors, and pollination systems of the angiosperms of the Juan Fernández Islands (Chile)". The Botanical Review. 67 (3): 255–308. doi:10.1007/BF02858097. ISSN 0006-8101.
- Blanchon, D. J.; Murray, B. G.; Braggins, J. E. (2002). "A taxonomic revision of Libertia (Iridaceae) in New Zealand". New Zealand Journal of Botany. 40 (3): 437–456. doi:10.1080/0028825X.2002.9512805. ISSN 0028-825X.
- Goldblatt, Peter; Celis, Marcela (2005). "Notes on Libertia (Iridaceae: Sisyrinchieae) in South America". Contributions to Botany. 21 (4). The Botanical Research Institute of Texas, Inc.: 2105–2112. ISSN 0036-1488. JSTOR 41968506.
- Goldblatt, Peter; Rodriguez, Aaron; Powell, M. P.; Davies, Jonathan T.; Manning, John C.; Van der Bank, M.; Savolainen, Vincent (2008). "Iridaceae 'Out of Australasia'? Phylogeny, Biogeography, and Divergence Time Based on Plastid DNA Sequences". Systematic Botany. 33 (3): 495–508. doi:10.1600/036364408785679806. ISSN 0363-6445.
- Moore, L. B. (1967). "The New Zealand species of Libertia (Iridaceae)". New Zealand Journal of Botany. 5 (2): 255–275. doi:10.1080/0028825X.1967.10428745. ISSN 0028-825X.
- Thorsen, Michael J.; Dickinson, Katharine J.M.; Seddon, Philip J. (2009). "Seed Dispersal Systems in the New Zealand Flora". Perspectives in Plant Ecology. 11 (4). Elsevier BV: 285–309. doi:10.1016/j.ppees.2009.06.001. ISSN 1433-8319.

Websites

- De Lange, Peter J.; Gosden, Jane; Courtney, Shannel; Fergus, Alexander Jon; Barkla, John W.; Beadel, S. M.; Champion, Paul D.; Hindmarsh-Walls, Rowan; Makan, Troy; Michel, Pascale (29 October 2024). "Conservation status of vascular plants in Aotearoa New Zealand, 2023" (PDF). Department of Conservation. ISSN 2324-1713. Archived (PDF) from the original on 10 February 2025.
- De Lange, Peter (2025). "Libertia micrantha". New Zealand Plant Conservation Network. Archived from the original on 9 July 2025.
