= Taurangakautuku River =

- Route of the Taurangakautuku River
- Mouth of the Taurangakautuku River Taurangakautuku River (North Island)

Location
- Country: New Zealand

Physical characteristics
- Source
  - location: Raukūmara Range
  - coordinates: 37°45′27″S 178°09′42″E
- Mouth
  - location: Awatere River
  - coordinates: 37°41′46″S 178°19′04″E

Basin features
- Progression: Taurangakautuku River → Awatere River → Kawakawa Bay → Pacific Ocean
- Tributaries
  - left: Makorokoro Stream, Mangapapa Stream, Whakahoutu Stream, Mangakopikopiko Stream
  - right: Wharewai Stream

The Taurangakautuku River is a river of the Gisborne Region of New Zealand's North Island. It flows northeast from the northern foothills of the Raukumara Range to reach the Awatere River eight kilometres southwest of Te Araroa.

== See also ==
- List of rivers of New Zealand
