= Libertia sessiliflora =

Scientific classification
- Kingdom: Plantae
- Clade: Tracheophytes
- Clade: Angiosperms
- Clade: Monocots
- Order: Asparagales
- Family: Iridaceae
- Genus: Libertia
- Species: L. sessiliflora

Binomial name
- Libertia sessiliflora (Poepp.) Skottsb.

Species of plant

Libertia sessiliflora is a species of flowering plant in the family Iridaceae. It is a perennal herb endemic to Chile, where it is distributed from the Valparaiso to the Los Lagos regions.
