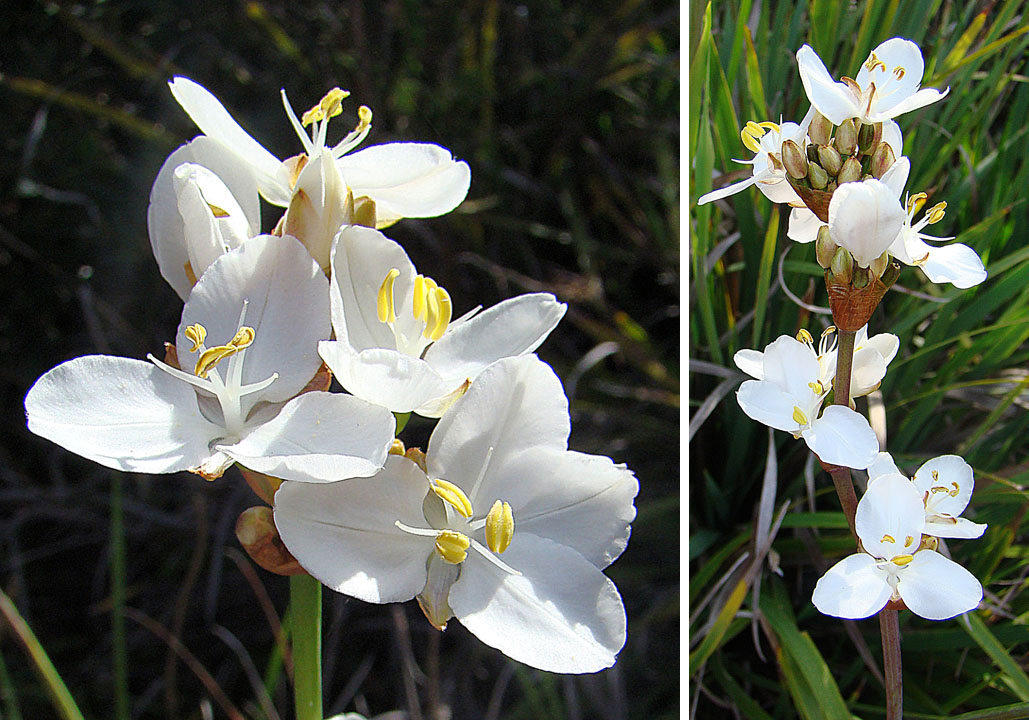

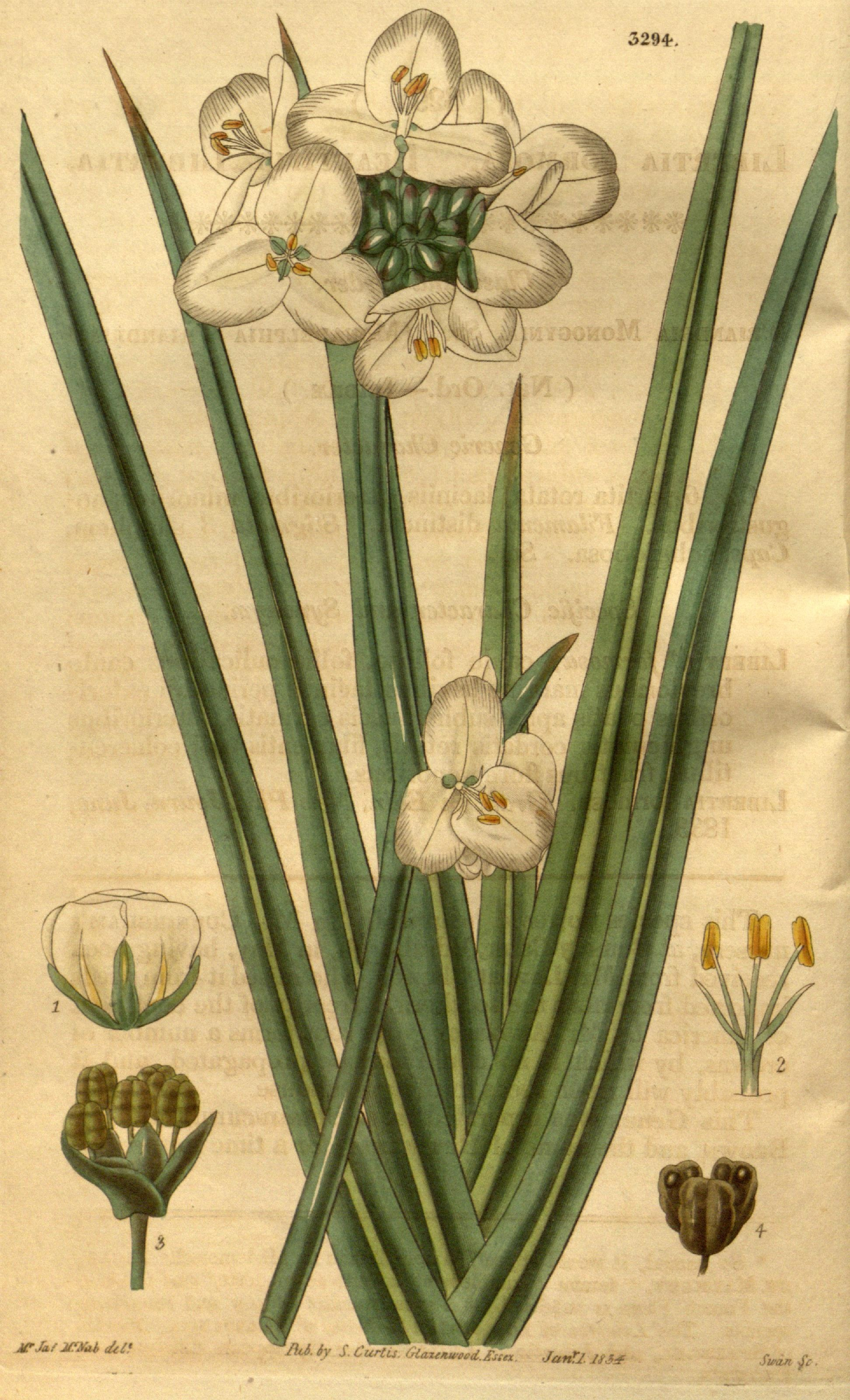
- Botanical illustration

Scientific classification
- Kingdom: Plantae
- Clade: Tracheophytes
- Clade: Angiosperms
- Clade: Monocots
- Order: Asparagales
- Family: Iridaceae
- Genus: Libertia
- Species: L. chilensis

Binomial name
- Libertia chilensis (Molina) Gunckel

Synonyms
- List: Choeradodia chilensis (Molina) Herb.; Libertia crassa Graham; Libertia elegans Poepp.; Libertia formosa Graham; Libertia formosa var. crassa (Graham) Baker; Libertia formosa var. grandiflora Johow; Libertia grandiflora Phil.; Libertia ixioides Gay; Orthrosanthus chilensis Klotzsch ex Baker; Sisyrinchium fernandezianum Steud.; Sisyrinchium formosum (Graham) F.Muell.; Strumaria chilensis Molina; Taumastos compressus Raf.; Tekel formosa (Graham) Kuntze

= Libertia chilensis =

Species of flowering plant

Libertia chilensis, synonym Libertia formosa, called the New Zealand satin flower, snowy mermaid, or Chilean-iris, is a species of flowering plant in the iris family, Iridaceae, native to the Juan Fernández Islands, central and southern Chile, and southern Argentina. It can also be found growing wild in the San Francisco Bay Area and San Bernardino County in California, where it is an introduced species. A rhizomatous evergreen perennial, it has gained the Royal Horticultural Society's Award of Garden Merit.

The Calle-Calle River in Los Ríos Region owes its name to the Mapuche word for the plant.
