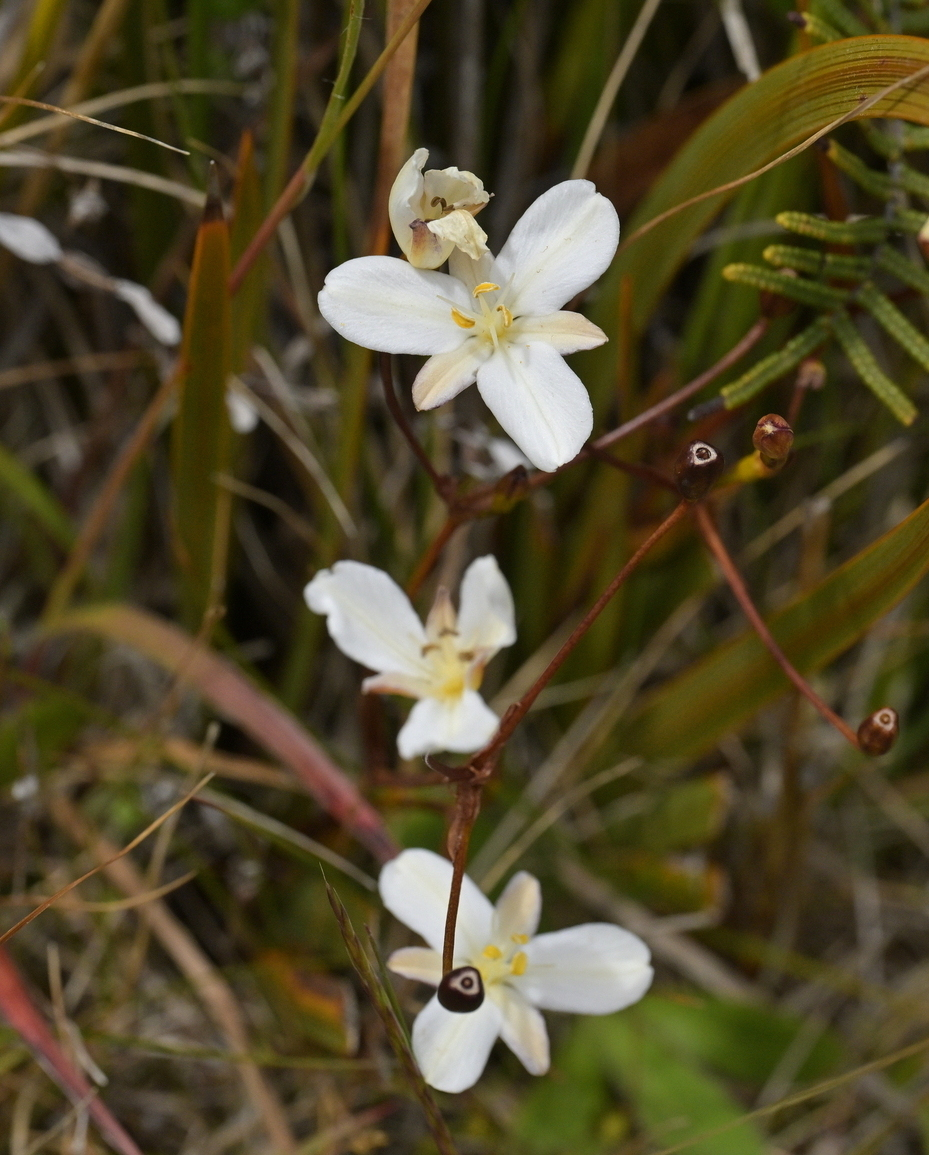
- Flowers of Libertia peregrinans

Conservation status
- Nationally Vulnerable (NZ TCS)

Scientific classification
- Kingdom: Plantae
- Clade: Tracheophytes
- Clade: Angiosperms
- Clade: Monocots
- Order: Asparagales
- Family: Iridaceae
- Genus: Libertia
- Species: L. peregrinans

Binomial name
- Libertia peregrinans Cockayne & Allan

= Libertia peregrinans =

Species of flowering plant

Libertia peregrinans, commonly known as mikoikoi and the New Zealand iris, is a species of flowering plant in the family Iridaceae. It is endemic to New Zealand; its range covers the North, South, and Stewart Islands. It also occurs on the Chatham Islands. L. peregrinans inhabits coastal to lowland areas. It typically occurs near coastal scrub, beaches, dune systems, estuaries, and river mouths. It was first described by Leonard Cockayne and Harry Allan in 1927, formerly being included in the L. ixioides taxon. Its specific epithet, peregrinans, means 'wandering'.

== Description ==
Libertia peregrinans is a species of perennial herb in the family Iridaceae and the subfamily Iridoideae. It reaches 0.3 metres (1 foot 0 inches) in height. Its leaves reach 130–700 mm × 3–9 mm long, they also can turn to a copper colour when exposed to sunlight. Its margins are often finely rough (scabrid) in texture. The inflorescences (flower clusters) have short peduncles. Its panicles are narrow and cloesly branched. Each panicle has 1 to 7 flowers with slender pedicels, which are about 10–30 mm long. Its bracts are 40–170 mm long.

Flowers are 10–30 mm in diameter, with white-coloured tepals. Its stamens are found at the base, with yellow-brown anthers which are about 3–3.5 mm long. Fruits are 6–15 × 4–10 mm long, initially green maturing to orange yellow, or black, splitting open at maturity with often widely recurved valves. Its seeds are a bright tangerine-orange colour, 1–1.5 mm long, and partially globe-shaped in character.

== Taxonomy ==
The Libertia genus was first established in 1824 by the German botanist Kurt Polycarp Joachim Sprengel. Hooker (1867) first suggested the L. peregrinans taxon as var. 'ß' of L. ixioides. L. peregrinans was first described in 1927 by Leonard Cockayne and Harry Allan. In 1952, Lucy Cranwell studied the pollination of various New Zealand plant species; in her study, she mentioned Libertia pollen provides no strong similarity with any other species.

=== Evolution ===
Goldblatt et al. (2008) hypothesised, based on DNA sequencing analysis data, that Orthrosanthus appears to be the most closely related genus to Libertia. The lineage, consisting of Libertia and Orthrosanthus, appears to have split from other groups around twenty-seven million years ago, with Libertia and Orthrosanthus (or their respective ancestors) diverging from each other in the Early Miocene, likely around twenty-two million years ago. A 1980 analysis by D. C. Mildenhall of Libertia pollen from the Mid Miocene in New Zealand also supports the estimated divergence time for the genus.

=== Etymology ===
The etymology (word origin) of L. peregrinans's genus name, Libertia, is named in honour of the Belgian botanist and writer Marie-Anne Libert. The specific epithet (second part of the scientific name), peregrinans, means 'wandering'. The species is commonly known as mikoikoi and New Zealand iris.

== Distribution ==
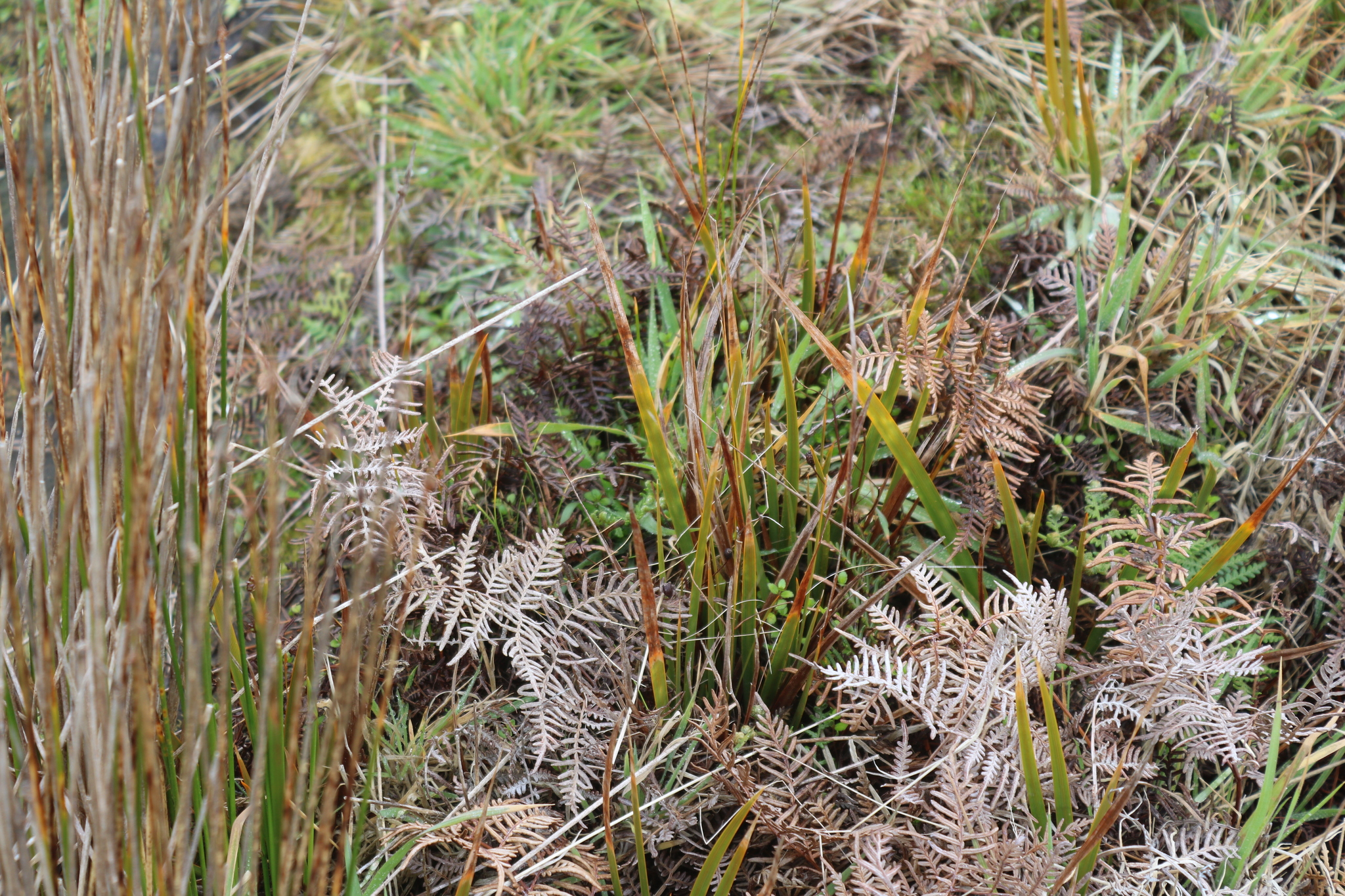
L. peregrinans in its natural habitat

Libertia peregrinans is endemic to New Zealand. Its range covers the North, South, and Stewart Islands. It also occurs on the Chatham Islands. In the North Island, its range covers the western side of the island between Kawhia Harbour and Wellington. In the South Island, L. peregrinans occurs in two main populations, one of these occurs through the coastal West Coast, Nelson, and Marlborough Regions. L. peregrinans's second main distribution area is found in the Southland and Otago Regions. Collections from North-West Nelson are hybrids with L. ixioides. Other specimens from inland areas such as Lake Te Anau, Taranaki, and near Mount Ruapehu also show some L. ixioides characteristics. L. peregrinans's 2023 assessment in the New Zealand Threat Classification System was "Threatened – Nationally Vulnerable".

=== Habitat ===
Libertia peregrinans inhabits coastal to lowland areas. It typically occurs near coastal scrub, beaches, dune systems, estuaries, and river mouths. It can also occasionally be found inland. It grows to an altitude of 915 m (3,000 ft) above sea level. L. peregrinans seems to prefer gravelly, peaty, pumiceous and sandy soils. It commonly coincides with various native New Zealand plants, such as Apodasmia similis and Gleichenia dicarpa.

== Ecology ==
Libertia species are pollinated by insects.

== Works cited ==
Books

- Cranwell, Lucy May (1952). New Zealand pollen studies: the monocotyledons: a comparative account. Auckland, New Zealand: Harvard University Press.
- Duggan, Jim (2004). Plants in the Getty's Central Garden. Los Angeles, United States: Getty Publications. ISBN 978-0-89236-714-6.
- Gledhill, David (2008). The Names of Plants. Cambridge, United Kingdom: Cambridge University Press. ISBN 978-0-521-68553-5.
- Hooker, Joseph Dalton (1867). Handbook of the New Zealand Flora [...]. London, United Kingdom.

Journals

- Bernardello, Gabriel; Anderson, Gregory J.; Stuessy, Tod F.; Crawford, Daniel J. (2001). "A survey of floral traits, breeding systems, floral visitors, and pollination systems of the angiosperms of the Juan Fernández Islands (Chile)". The Botanical Review. 67 (3): 255–308. doi:10.1007/BF02858097. ISSN 0006-8101.
- Blanchon, D. J.; Murray, B. G.; Braggins, J. E. (2002). "A taxonomic revision of Libertia (Iridaceae) in New Zealand". New Zealand Journal of Botany. 40 (3): 437–456. doi:10.1080/0028825X.2002.9512805. ISSN 0028-825X.
- Cockayne, Leonard; Allan, Harry (1927). "Transactions and Proceedings of the Royal Society of New Zealand". Royal Society of New Zealand. 57. Archived from the original on 13 May 2024.
- Goldblatt, Peter; Celis, Marcela (2005). "Notes on Libertia (Iridaceae: Sisyrinchieae) in South America". Contributions to Botany. 21 (4). The Botanical Research Institute of Texas, Inc.: 2105–2112. ISSN 0036-1488. JSTOR 41968506.
- Goldblatt, Peter; Rodriguez, Aaron; Powell, M. P.; Davies, Jonathan T.; Manning, John C.; Van der Bank, M.; Savolainen, Vincent (2008). "Iridaceae 'Out of Australasia'? Phylogeny, Biogeography, and Divergence Time Based on Plastid DNA Sequences". Systematic Botany. 33 (3): 495–508. doi:10.1600/036364408785679806. ISSN 0363-6445.
- Moore, L. B. (1967). "The New Zealand species of Libertia (Iridaceae)". New Zealand Journal of Botany. 5 (2): 255–275. doi:10.1080/0028825X.1967.10428745. ISSN 0028-825X.

Miscellaneous

- De Lange, Peter J.; Gosden, Jane; Courtney, Shannel; Fergus, Alexander Jon; Barkla, John W.; Beadel, S. M.; Champion, Paul D.; Hindmarsh-Walls, Rowan; Makan, Troy; Michel, Pascale (29 October 2024). "Conservation status of vascular plants in Aotearoa New Zealand, 2023" (PDF). Department of Conservation. ISSN 2324-1713. Archived (PDF) from the original on 10 February 2025.
- Daly, Gerry (5 June 2024). "Gardening with Gerry: Lovely Libertia Leads the Way". Irish Farmers Journal. Archived from the original on 15 July 2025.
- De Lange, Peter (2025). "Libertia peregrinans". New Zealand Plant Conservation Network. Archived from the original on 4 August 2025.
