= Kōpuapounamu River =

- Route of the Kōpuapounamu River
- Mouth of the Kōpuapounamu River Kōpuapounamu River (North Island)

Location
- Country: New Zealand

Physical characteristics
- Source
  - location: Raukūmara Range
  - coordinates: 37°45′30″S 178°07′17″E
- Mouth
  - location: Awatere River
  - coordinates: 37°41′43″S 178°19′04″E

Basin features
- Progression: Kōpuapounamu River → Awatere River → Kawakawa Bay → Pacific Ocean
- Tributaries
  - left: Pōhue Stream, Mākākāriki Stream, Te Whairepo Stream, Kakiotemoa Stream, Te Puia Stream
  - right: Matawera Stream, Waihora Stream, Mangakiokio Stream, Matawera Stream

The Kōpuapounamu River is a river of the northeast of New Zealand's North Island. It flows east from the eastern end of the Raukūmara Range, reaching the Awatere River 6 kilometres (4 mi) south of Te Araroa.

== See also ==
- List of rivers of New Zealand
