= Awatere River (Gisborne) =

River in Gisborne District, New Zealand

- Route of the Awatere River
- Mouth of the Awatere River Awatere River (Gisborne) (North Island)
- Etymology: "Swift river" in Māori

Location
- Country: New Zealand
- Island: North Island
- Region: Gisborne

Physical characteristics
- Source: Confluence of the Taurangakautuku River and the Kōpuapounamu River
  - location: Near Whakaangiangi
  - coordinates: 37°41′44″S 178°19′09″E
- Mouth: Kawakawa Bay
  - location: Te Araroa
  - coordinates: 37°37′54″S 178°22′39″E

Basin features
- Progression: Awatere River → Kawakawa Bay → Pacific Ocean
- Tributaries
  - left: Mangaowira Stream
  - right: Kaipō Stream, Tangikaroro Stream, Tokatawhitiwhiti Stream, Mangatakawa Stream, Mangaotihe Stream, Ōtāwhau Stream
- Bridges: Awatere River Bridge (1647), Awatere Bridge

The Awatere River is a river in the Gisborne region of the North island of New Zealand. The Awatere is formed by the confluence of the Kopuapounamu River and the Taurangakautuku River and enters the Pacific Ocean just east of Te Araroa.

The New Zealand Ministry for Culture and Heritage gives a translation of "swift river" for Awatere.

State Highway 35 runs down the valley of the Awatere for much of the river's length.

== See also ==
- List of rivers of New Zealand
