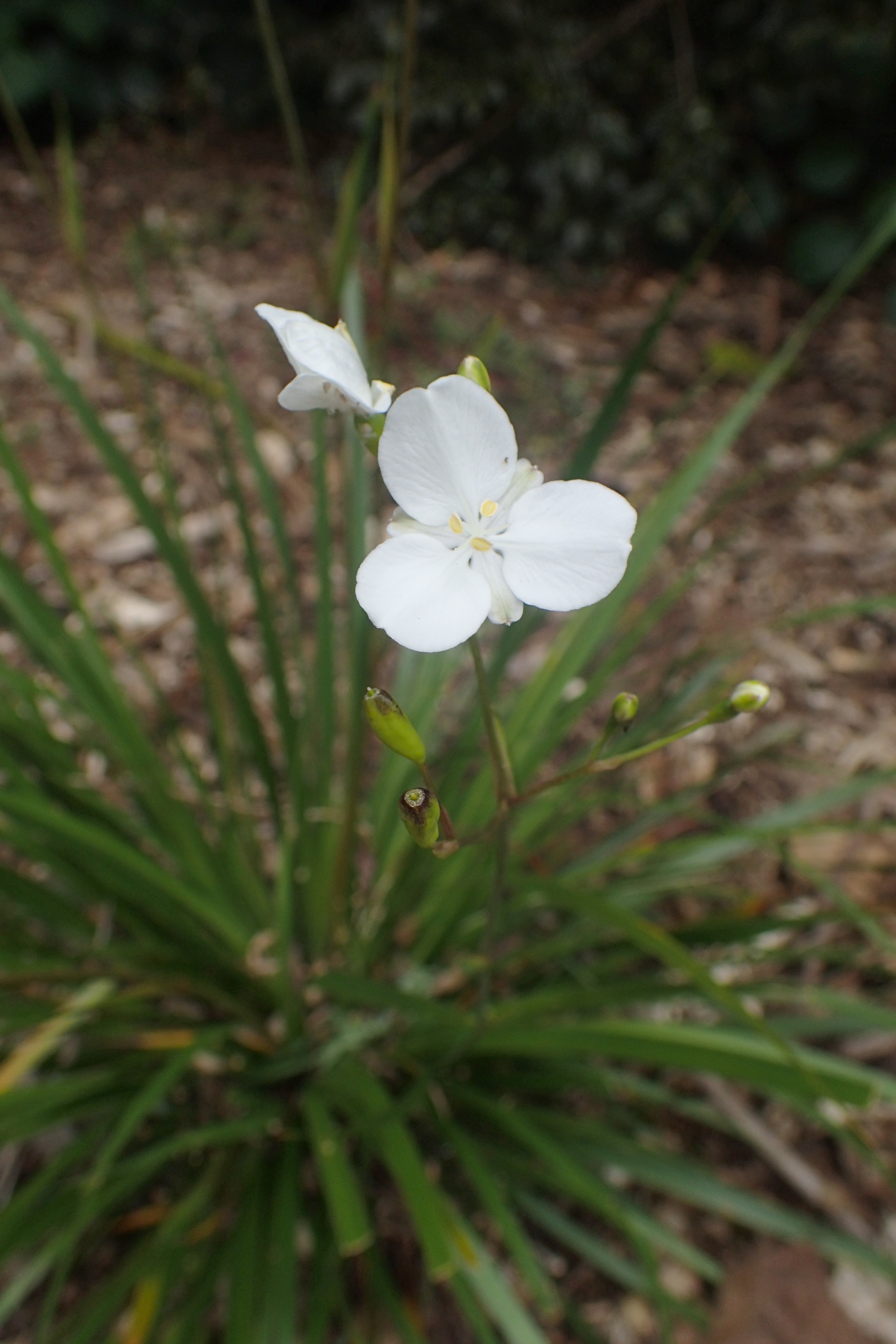
- Libertia mooreae at the Auckland Botanic Gardens

Scientific classification
- Kingdom: Plantae
- Clade: Tracheophytes
- Clade: Angiosperms
- Clade: Monocots
- Order: Asparagales
- Family: Iridaceae
- Genus: Libertia
- Species: L. mooreae

Binomial name
- Libertia mooreae Blanchon, B.G.Murray & Braggins, 2002

= Libertia mooreae =

Species of plant

Libertia mooreae is a species of flowering plant in the family Iridaceae. The plant was first described by Dan Blanchon, Brian Grant Murray and John E. Braggins in 2002, and is native to New Zealand.

== Etymology ==
The species was named after New Zealand botanist Lucy Moore.

== Taxonomy ==
The specimens of the plant were previously identified as Libertia grandiflora. Leaf structure (equally spaced veins) and its smaller plant size were used to distinguish the species morphologically.

== Description ==
Libertia mooreae consists of leafy fans with white flowers. Plants differ morphologically between areas, with specimens found in the Marlborough District being smaller and more grass-like, while plants in the Aorere River area are much larger.

== Distribution and habitat ==
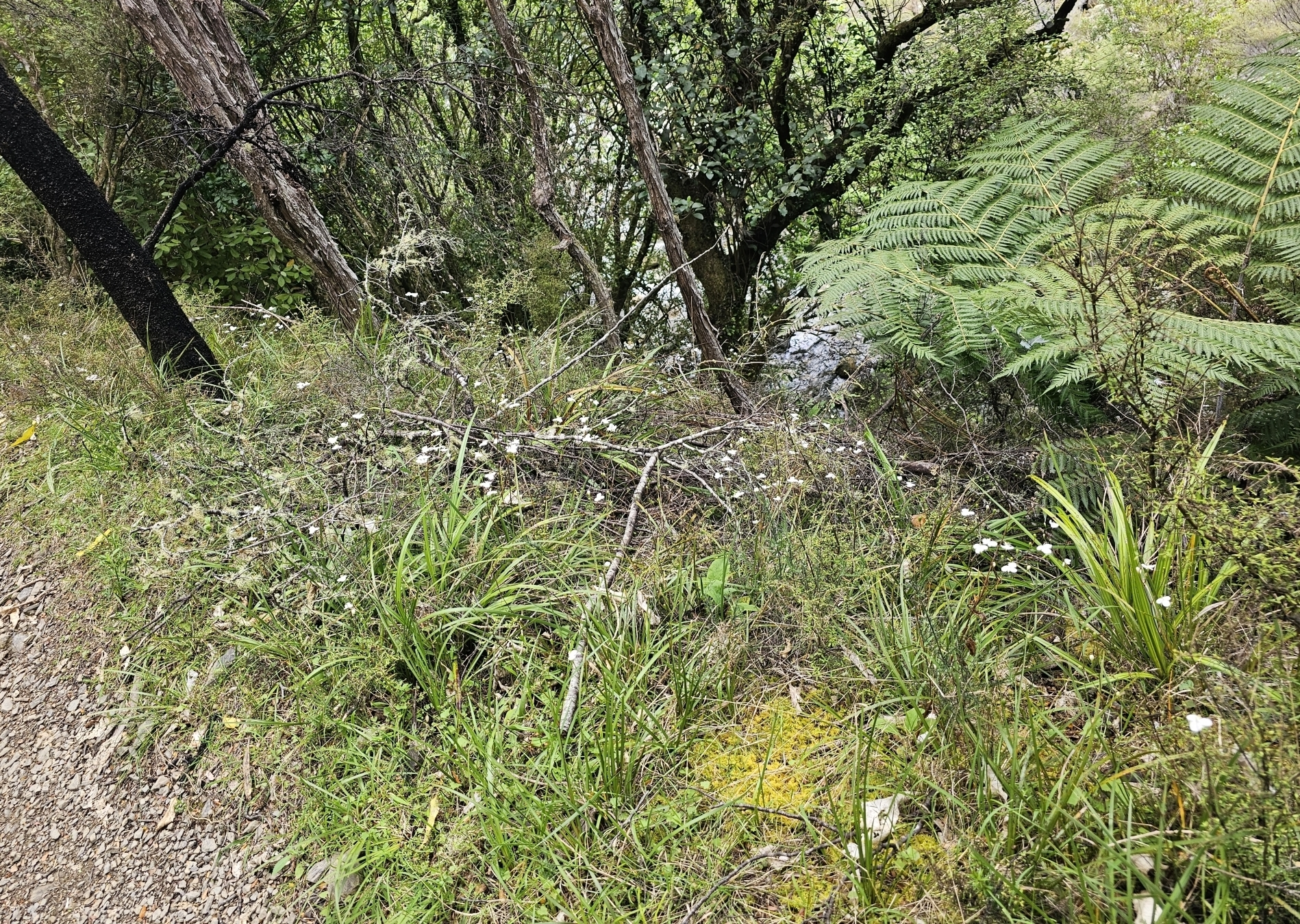
Libertia mooreae growing beside the Dun Mountain Trail in Nelson

Libertia mooreae is endemic to New Zealand, known to occur in the northern South Island in the Tasman District and Marlborough District, and the southern North Island, as far north as the Manawatū Gorge. Plants have commonly been found in Nothofagus and Podocarpus forest edges, among mānuka scrub, and has also been found in ridges, cliffs, rocky river banks.
