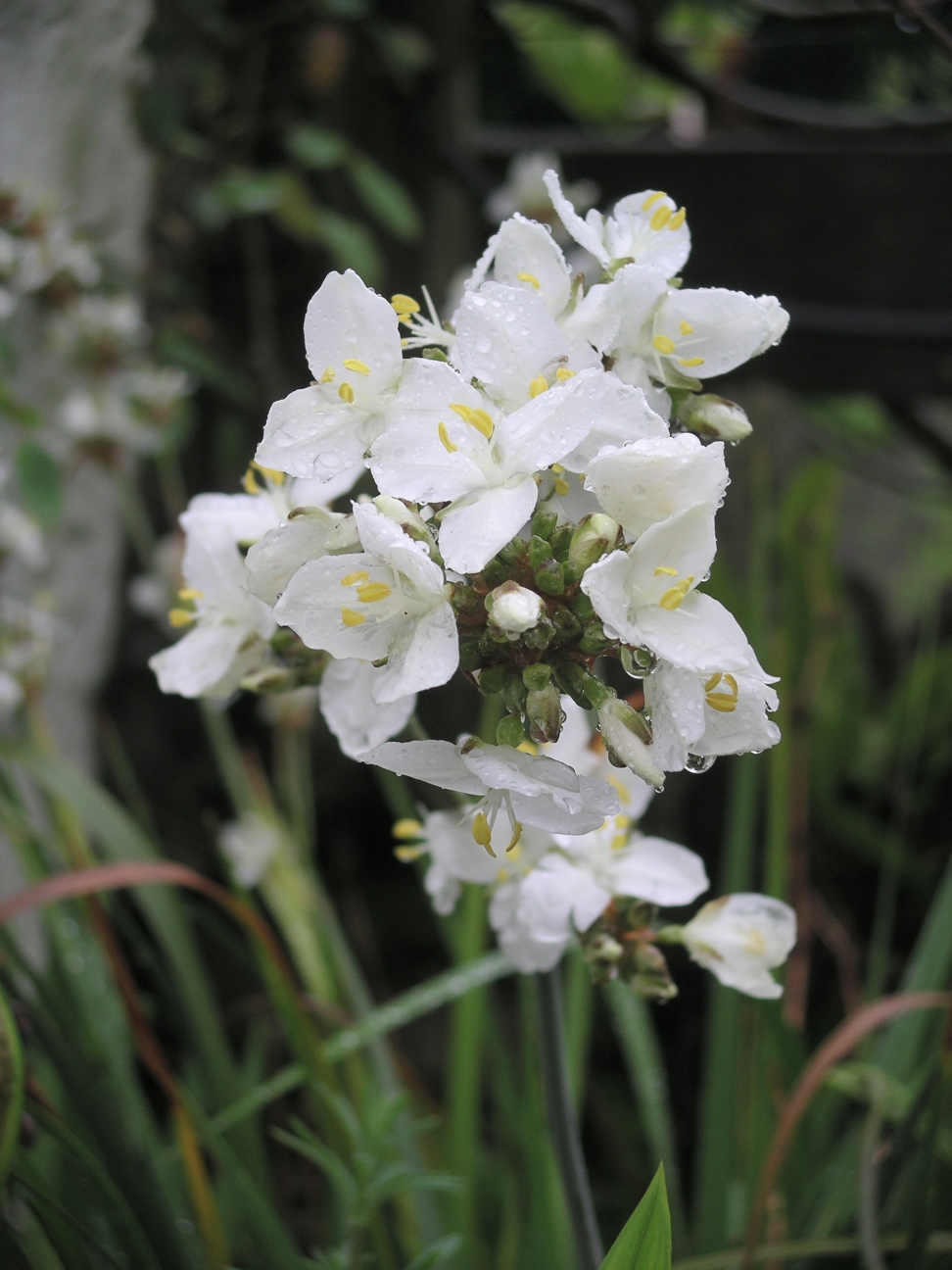
- Flowers of Libertia grandifolia

Conservation status
- Not Threatened (NZ TCS)

Scientific classification
- Kingdom: Plantae
- Clade: Tracheophytes
- Clade: Angiosperms
- Clade: Monocots
- Order: Asparagales
- Family: Iridaceae
- Genus: Libertia
- Species: L. grandiflora

Binomial name
- Libertia grandiflora (R.Br.) Sweet

Synonyms
- Renealmia grandiflora R.Br.; Tekel grandiflora Kuntze

= Libertia grandiflora =

Species of flowering plant

Libertia grandiflora, commonly known as mikoikoi and the New Zealand iris, is a species of flowering plant in the family Iridaceae. It is endemic to New Zealand; its range covers the North Island. Although specimens from the South Island were previously classified under L. grandiflora, they have since been reassigned to a newly established taxon. L. grandiflora is commonly found in lowland to montane areas with partial shade; it inhabits bluffs, cliffs, ridgelines, slopes, and the banks or terraces of streams. A perennial herb, it reaches 900 mm in height with leaves reaching 1400 mm in length. The species was first described by the botanist Robert Sweet in 1830. It gets its specific epithet, grandiflora, meaning 'large flowered'.

== Description ==
Libertia grandiflora is a species of perennial herb in the family Iridaceae and the subfamily Iridoideae. It reaches 0.6–0.9 metres (2 feet 0 inches – 2 feet 11 inches) in height. Its leaves are long and narrow, about 100–1400 mm × 2–12 mm long, its margins are often finely rough (scabrid) in texture. The inflorescences (flower clusters) are tall and rise above the foliage, with long peduncles. Its panicles are broad and openly branched. Each panicle has 1 to 6 flowers with slender pedicels, which are about 10–50 mm long. Its bracts are 40–130 mm long.

Flowers are 10–30 mm wide, with white-coloured tepals. Its stamens are found at the base, with yellow anthers which are about 3 mm long. Fruits are found in yellow-coloured, pear-shaped seed capsules, which are 6–14 × 4–8 mm long, initially green maturing to black, splitting open at maturity with often widely recurved valves. Its seeds are a bright tangerine-orange colour, 1–2 mm long, and rounded or angular in character.

== Taxonomy ==
The Libertia genus was first established in 1824 by the German botanist Kurt Polycarp Joachim Sprengel. L. grandiflora was first described in 1830 by the British botanist Robert Sweet. The original description is under Renealmia paniculata, where it refers to unpublished notes or a specimen collected by Daniel Solander and Joseph Banks. However, there are no New Zealand specimens of Libertia from the first voyage of James Cook, except L. pulchella, were found at the British Museum. The species was described as Tekelia grandiflora by the German botanist Otto Kuntze in 1891. The New Zealand botanist William Colenso described the species as Libertia orbicularis in 1883, what he thought to be a new species is now recognised as being L. grandiflora and hence is a heterotypic synonym of the species described earlier in 1830. In 1952, Lucy Cranwell studied the pollination of various New Zealand plant species; in her study, she mentioned Libertia pollen provides no strong similarity with any other species.

=== Evolution ===
Goldblatt et al. (2008) hypothesised, based on DNA sequencing analysis data, that Orthrosanthus appears to be the most closely related genus to Libertia. The lineage, consisting of Libertia and Orthrosanthus, appears to have split from other groups around twenty-seven million years ago, with Libertia and Orthrosanthus (or their respective ancestors) diverging from each other in the Early Miocene, likely around twenty-two million years ago. A 1980 analysis by D. C. Mildenhall of Libertia pollen from the Mid Miocene in New Zealand also supports the estimated divergence time for the genus.

=== Etymology ===
The etymology (word origin) of L. grandiflora's genus name, Libertia, is named in honour of the Belgian botanist and writer Marie-Anne Libert. The specific epithet (second part of the scientific name), grandiflora, derives from Latin, meaning 'large flowered'. The species is commonly known as mikoikoi and New Zealand iris.

== Distribution ==
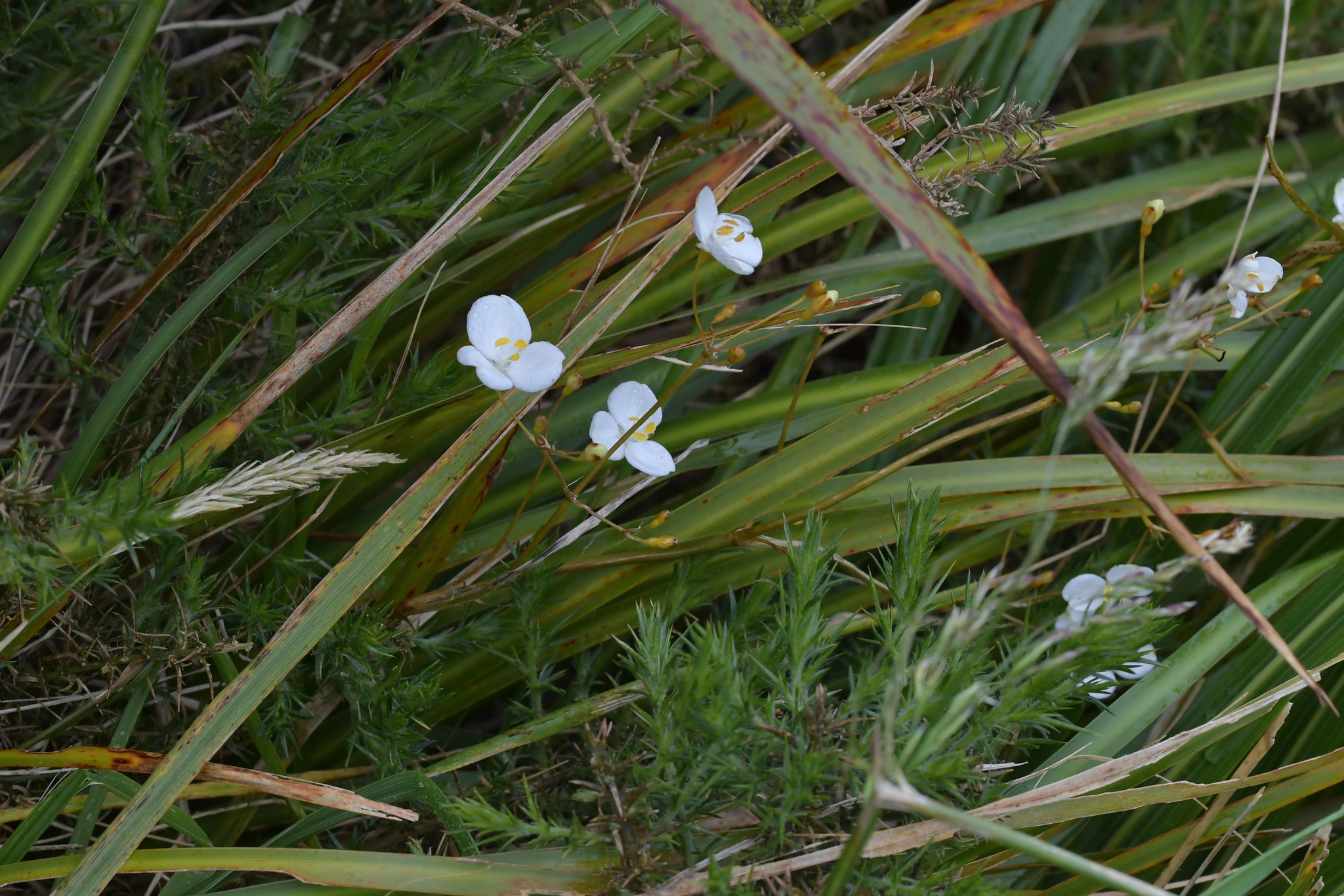
L. grandiflora in its natural habitat

L. grandiflora is endemic to New Zealand. Its range covers the North Island, where it is widespread from North Cape to Wellington, although the plant appears to be absent on the Volcanic Plateau. In the South Island, according to Moore (1967), the plant is not known to grow south of the Nelson and Marlborough Regions. Blanchon et al. (2002) described the South Island species as Libertia mooreae, as such, researchers claim that there are taxonomically no true L. grandiflora specimens in the South Island. L. grandiflora's 2023 assessment in the New Zealand Threat Classification System was "Not Threatened".

=== Habitat ===
L. grandiflora inhabits lowland to montane forests; it typically occurs in open lowland forest fragments on steep slopes, ridgelines, bluffs, cliffs, and the banks or terraces of rivers and streams. It is also occasionally found on dry sunny banks. L. grandiflora prefers sites with partial shade. It commonly coincides with various endemic New Zealand plants, such as Kunzea ericoides and Podocarpus totara.

== Ecology ==
Libertia species are pollinated by insects, although L. grandiflora is capable of self-pollination. Its seeds are likely dispersed by the wind.

== Works cited ==
Books

- Cheeseman, T. F. (1906). Manual of the New Zealand flora (1 ed.). Wellington, New Zealand: New Zealand Board of Science and Art.
- Cranwell, Lucy May (1952). New Zealand pollen studies: the monocotyledons: a comparative account. Auckland, New Zealand: Harvard University Press.
- Crowe, Andrew (2009). Which Native Forest Plant?. Auckland, New Zealand: Penguin Books. ISBN 978-0-14-300901-6.
- Gledhill, David (2008). The Names of Plants. Cambridge, United Kingdom: Cambridge University Press. ISBN 978-0-521-68553-5.
- Kuntze, Otto (1891). Revisio Generum Plantarum [Revision of Plant Genera] (in Latin). Leipzig, Germany: A. Felix [etc.] doi:10.5962/bhl.title.327.
- Laing, R. M.; Blackwell, E. W. (1906). Plants of New Zealand. Christchurch, New Zealand: Whitcombe and Tombs.
- Sweet, Robert (1830). Sweet's Hortus Britannicus [...]. London, United Kingdom: J. Ridgway. doi:10.5962/bhl.title.86996.

Journals

- Bernardello, Gabriel; Anderson, Gregory J.; Stuessy, Tod F.; Crawford, Daniel J. (2001). "A survey of floral traits, breeding systems, floral visitors, and pollination systems of the angiosperms of the Juan Fernández Islands (Chile)". The Botanical Review. 67 (3): 255–308. doi:10.1007/BF02858097. ISSN 0006-8101.
- Blanchon, D. J.; Murray, B. G.; Braggins, J. E. (2002). "A taxonomic revision of Libertia (Iridaceae) in New Zealand". New Zealand Journal of Botany. 40 (3): 437–456. doi:10.1080/0028825X.2002.9512805. ISSN 0028-825X.
- Colenso, William (1883). "Transactions and Proceedings of the Royal Society of New Zealand". Royal Society of New Zealand. 15. Archived from the original on 23 June 2025.
- Connor, H. E. (1985). "Biosystematics of Higher Plants in New Zealand 1965–1984". New Zealand Journal of Botany. 23 (4): 613–643. doi:10.1080/0028825X.1985.10434233. ISSN 0028-825X.
- Goldblatt, Peter; Celis, Marcela (2005). "Notes on Libertia (Iridaceae: Sisyrinchieae) in South America". Contributions to Botany. 21 (4). The Botanical Research Institute of Texas, Inc.: 2105–2112. ISSN 0036-1488. JSTOR 41968506.
- Goldblatt, Peter; Rodriguez, Aaron; Powell, M. P.; Davies, Jonathan T.; Manning, John C.; Van der Bank, M.; Savolainen, Vincent (2008). "Iridaceae 'Out of Australasia'? Phylogeny, Biogeography, and Divergence Time Based on Plastid DNA Sequences". Systematic Botany. 33 (3): 495–508. doi:10.1600/036364408785679806. ISSN 0363-6445.
- Moore, L. B. (1967). "The New Zealand species of Libertia (Iridaceae)". New Zealand Journal of Botany. 5 (2): 255–275. doi:10.1080/0028825X.1967.10428745. ISSN 0028-825X.
- Thorsen, Michael J.; Dickinson, Katharine J.M.; Seddon, Philip J. (2009). "Seed Dispersal Systems in the New Zealand Flora". Perspectives in Plant Ecology. 11 (4). Elsevier BV: 285–309. doi:10.1016/j.ppees.2009.06.001. ISSN 1433-8319.

Miscellaneous

- De Lange, Peter J.; Gosden, Jane; Courtney, Shannel; Fergus, Alexander Jon; Barkla, John W.; Beadel, S. M.; Champion, Paul D.; Hindmarsh-Walls, Rowan; Makan, Troy; Michel, Pascale (29 October 2024). "Conservation status of vascular plants in Aotearoa New Zealand, 2023" (PDF). Department of Conservation. ISSN 2324-1713. Archived (PDF) from the original on 10 February 2025.
- Daly, Gerry (5 June 2024). "Gardening with Gerry: Lovely Libertia Leads the Way". Irish Farmers Journal. Archived from the original on 15 July 2025.
- De Lange, Peter (2025). "Libertia grandiflora". New Zealand Plant Conservation Network. Archived from the original on 20 April 2025.
