= John E. Braggins =

New Zealand bryologist (1944–2025)

John Edward Braggins
- Born: 9 August 1944; Wellington, New Zealand
- Died: 1 October 2025 (aged 81)
- Scientific career
- Fields: Biology; bryology
- Institutions: University of Auckland
- Thesis: Studies on the New Zealand, and some related, species of Pteris L. (1975)

John E. Braggins (9 August 1944 – 1 October 2025) was a New Zealand botanist and bryologist, known for his research into ferns and liverworts. Braggins lectured at the University of Auckland from 1969 until 2000, during which time he supervised and mentored a significant number of New Zealand botanists. During Braggins' career, he took part in the identification of 12 species and one suborder, many of which are endemic New Zealand liverworts.

== Life and career ==
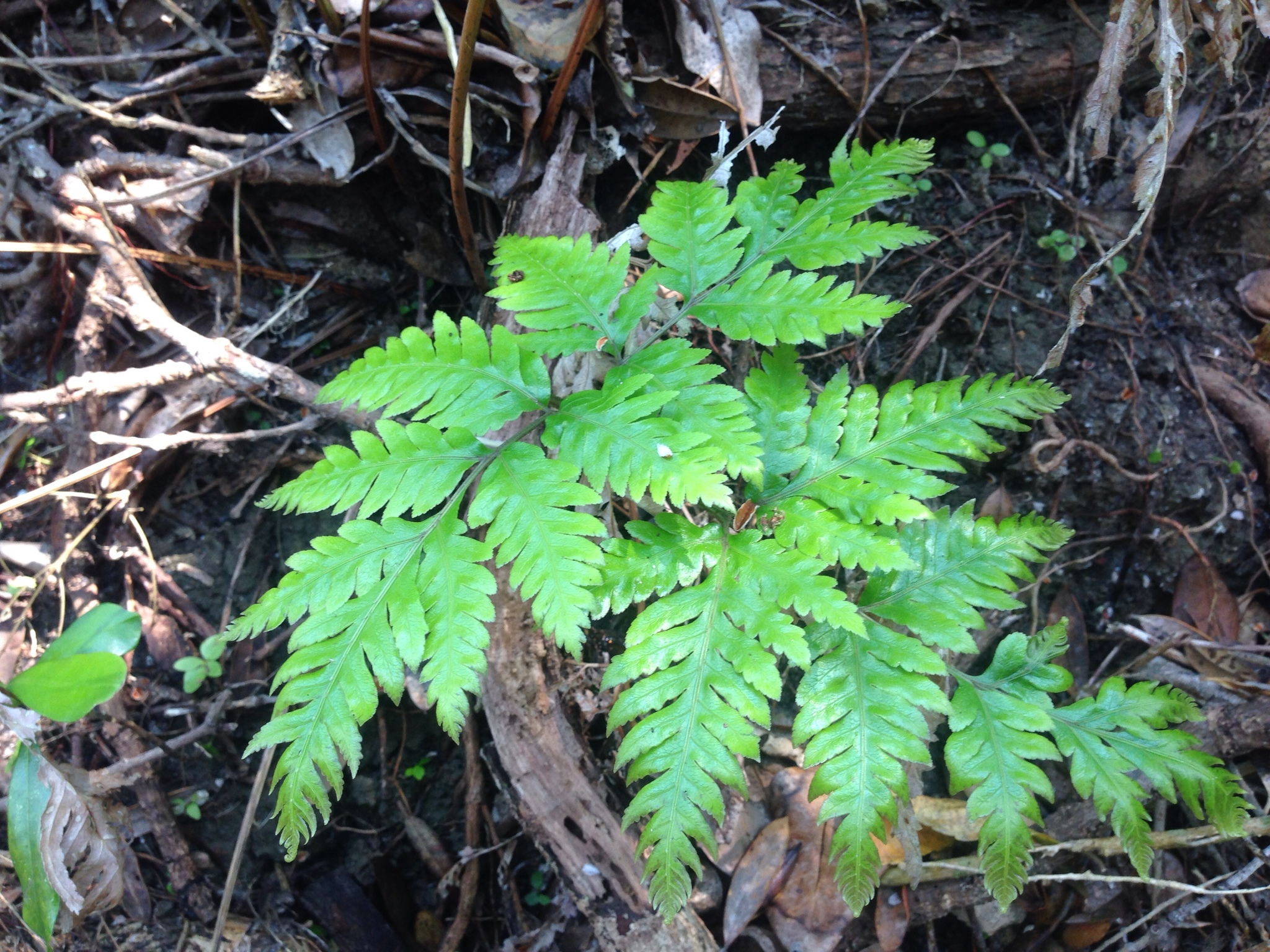
Braggins' 1975 PhD focused on the fern genus Pteris, in which he recognised Pteris carsei (pictured) was distinct from Pteris comans. This was formally described 45 years later in 2020.

Braggins was born in Wellington on 9 August 1944. He was adopted by Edward George Braggins and Sarah Braggins, who moved to Dannevirke, where he spent much of his childhood. For his first year of high school, the family moved back to Wellington, where Braggins attended Rongotai College.

He developed an interest in ferns as a child, in part due to his parents buying Braggins a copy of Herbert Boucher Dobbie's New Zealand Ferns. His parents allowed him to build ferneries at the family's homes in Dannevirke and Wellington.

Braggins attended the Victoria University of Wellington, attaining a Bachelor of Science in 1966, followed by a Master of Science in 1969, during which he studied the fern genus Botrychium. At university, Braggins was an active part of the Victoria University biological society, and attended field trips organised by the Wellington Botanical Society.

In 1969, Braggins moved to Auckland, where he became a lecturer in botany at the University of Auckland and worked on a PhD on Pteris ferns, being awarded the doctorate in 1975. Braggins became a senior lecturer in the biology department, and was a supervisor and lecturer for biologists such as Elizabeth Brown, Peter de Lange, Matt Renner, Matt von Konrat, Dan Blanchon and Mark F. Large, many of whom were inspired to become bryologists by Braggins. Braggins collaborated with Large to produce Spore Atlas of New Zealand Ferns and Fern Allies (1991). The pair continued collaborating on fern-related studies, and in 2004 produced the book Tree Ferns, the first major work focusing entirely on the taxonomy and horticulture of tree ferns.

Braggins developed an interest for hornworts and liverworts during his university studies, which led to him making major contributions to the knowledge of New Zealand endemic liverworts, including making descriptions for nine liverwort species, and contributing to Engel & Glenny's Flora of the Liverworts and Hornworts of New Zealand. Over time, Braggins became known as one of the leading experts in hepaticology (the study of liverworts) in New Zealand. At the University of Auckland, Braggins worked on the identification of Riccardia furtiva in 1989 and Zoopsis nitida in 1997.

Braggins lectured at the University of Auckland until 2000, when he was made to retire due to a department restructure. This led Braggins to becoming an honorary research associate of Auckland War Memorial Museum, where he donated many of his type specimens, and working as a freelance botanical consultant. Braggins worked on identifying the Libertia species L. cranwelliae and L. mooreae (named after Lucy Cranwell and Lucy Moore respectively) in 2002, and helped in the identification of five species of Frullania liverworts between 2003 and 2011. Further collaborative work by Braggins helped in the identification of the liverworts Lophocolea mediinfrons and Schizophyllopsis papillosa in 2013, and in 2015, the suborder Myliineae, which Braggins had identified in 2005 with J. J. Engel, was formally described.

In 2020, Braggins collaborated on a paper which established Pteris carsei as a distinct species separate from Pteris comans; something that Braggins had originally recognised in his 1975 PhD. Braggins died on 1 October 2025, at the age of 81.

The standard author abbreviation Braggins is used to indicate this person as the author when citing a botanical name.

== Legacy ==
In 1999, Braggins received the Borg-Warner Robert O. Bass Visiting Scientist award by the Field Museum of Natural History in Chicago. Braggins received the Allan Mere Award, the premier award given by the New Zealand Botanical Society, in 2013. In 2024, Braggins became an Associate Emeritus of Auckland War Memorial Museum, in recognition for his contributions to plant taxonomy, education and dedication to botany.

Two species have been named after Braggins: the monotypic liverwort Bragginsella anomala in 1997, and the liverwort Lepidozia bragginsiana in 2014. The taxon authors of Lepidozia bragginsiana chose to recognise Braggins due to his role in organising liverwort collecting expeditions and for mentoring younger bryologists.

== Taxa identified by Braggins ==
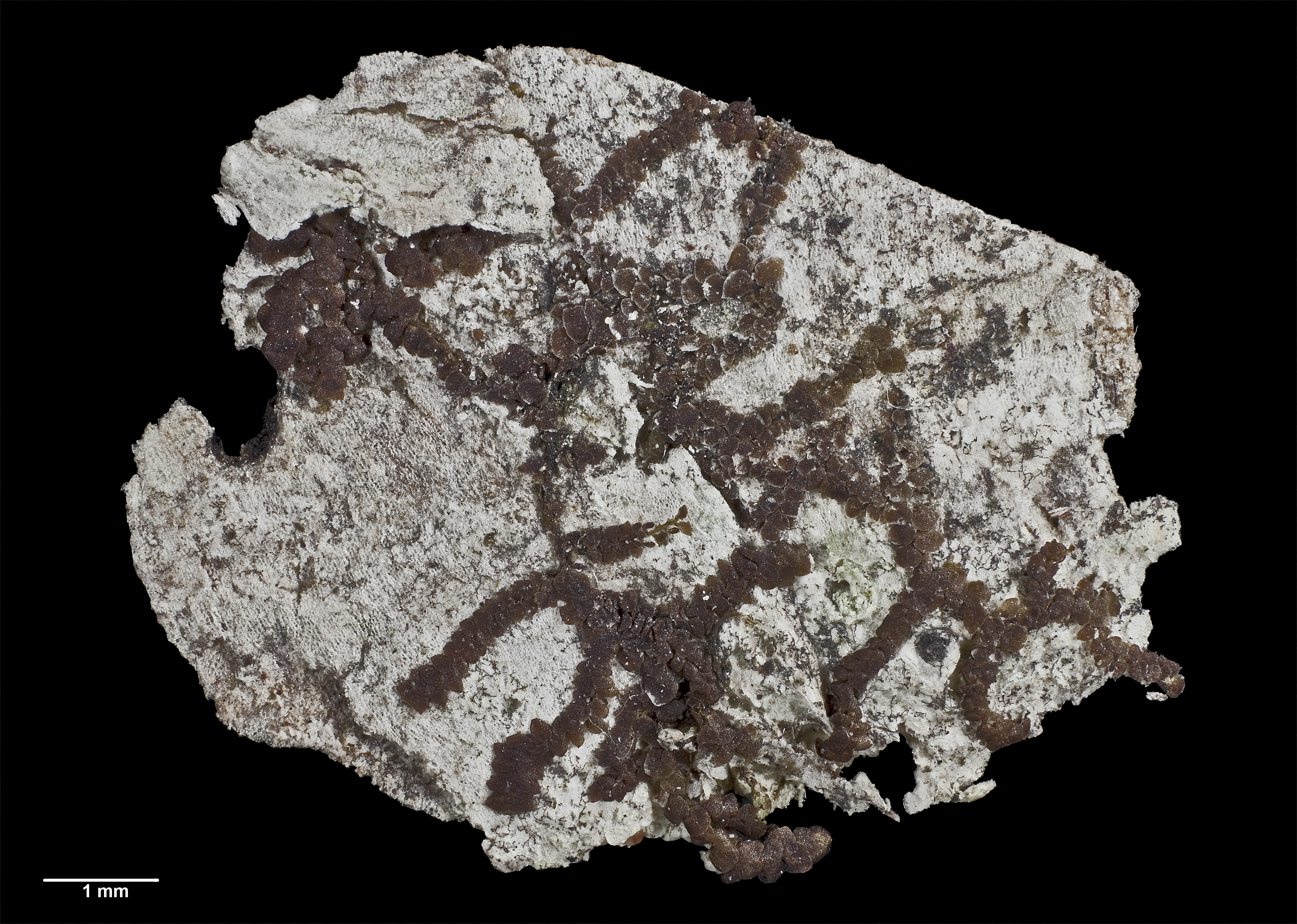
Frullania wairua, a species identified by Matt von Konrat and Braggins in 2005

- Frullania colliculosa von Konrat, Braggins, Hentschel & Heinrichs, 2010
- Frullania hattorii von Konrat & Braggins, 2003
- Frullania hodgsoniae von Konrat, Braggins, Hentschel & Heinrichs, 2010
- Frullania truncatistyla von Konrat, Hentschel, Heinrichs & Braggins, 2011
- Frullania wairua von Konrat & Braggins, 2005
- Libertia cranwelliae Blanchon, Murray & Braggins, 2002
- Libertia edgariae Blanchon, Murray & Braggins, 2002
- Libertia mooreae Blanchon, Murray & Braggins, 2002
- Lophocolea mediinfrons (J.J.Engel & Braggins) L.Söderstr., 2013
- Myliineae J. J. Engel & Braggins ex Crand.-Stotl., Váňa, Stotler & J.J. Engel, 2015
- Pteris carsei Brownsey & Braggins, 2020
- Ramalina erumpens D.Blanchon, J.Braggins & A.Stewart, 1996
- Ramalina erumpens var. norstictica D.Blanchon, J.Braggins & A.Stewart, 1996
- Ramalina inflexa D.Blanchon, J.Braggins & A.Stewart, 1996
- Ramalina riparia D.Blanchon, J.Braggins & A.Stewart, 1996
- Riccardia furtiva Brown & Braggins, 1989
- Schizophyllopsis papillosa (J.J.Engel & Braggins) Váňa & L.Söderstr., 2013
- Zoopsis nitida Glenny, Braggins & Schust, 1997

== Selected bibliography ==
- Blanchon, Daniel J.; Braggins, John E.; Stewart, Alison (26 February 1996). "The lichen genus Ramalina in New Zealand". The Journal of the Hattori Botanical Laboratory. 79 (0): 43–98. doi:10.18968/JHBL.79.0_43. ISSN 0073-0912. Wikidata Q111484771.
- Braggins, J. E. (1996), Report of the conservation status of Norfolk Island ferns, Auckland: Auckland UniServices, OCLC 897015506, Wikidata Q127067745
- Ogden, John; Braggins, John; Stretton, Kim; Anderson, Sandra (1997). "Plant species richness under Pinus radiata stands on the central North Island volcanic plateau, New Zealand". New Zealand Journal of Ecology. 21 (1): 17–29. ISSN 0110-6465. JSTOR 24054521. Wikidata Q126934640.
- Tomlinson, P. Barry; Braggins, John E.; Rattenbury, Jack A. (1 February 1997). "Contrasted pollen capture mechanisms in Phyllocladaceae and certain Podocarpaceae (Coniferales)". American Journal of Botany. 84 (2): 214–223. doi:10.2307/2446083. ISSN 0002-9122. JSTOR 2446083. PMID 21712201. Wikidata Q84463468.
- Salter, Joshua; Murray, Brian G.; Braggins, John E (1 February 2002). "Wettable and unsinkable: the hydrodynamics of saccate pollen grains in relation to the pollination mechanism in the two New Zealand species of Prumnopitys Phil. (Podocarpaceae)". Annals of Botany. 89 (2): 133–144. doi:10.1093/AOB/MCF019. ISSN 0305-7364. PMC 4233786. PMID 12099344. Wikidata Q28652112.
- Toyota, Masao; Shimamura, Takuji; Ishii, Hikari; Renner, Matt; Braggins, John; Asakawa, Yoshinori (1 October 2002). "New bibenzyl cannabinoid from the New Zealand liverwort Radula marginata". Chemical and Pharmaceutical Bulletin. 50 (10): 1390–1392. doi:10.1248/CPB.50.1390. ISSN 0009-2363. PMID 12372871. Wikidata Q44174412.
- Asakawa, Yoshinori; Toyota, Masao; von Konrat, Matt; Braggins, John E. (February 2003). "Volatile components of selected species of the liverwort genera Frullania and Schusterella (Frullaniaceae) from New Zealand, Australia and South America: a chemosystematic approach". Phytochemistry. 62 (3): 439–452. doi:10.1016/S0031-9422(02)00542-3. ISSN 0031-9422. PMID 12620357. Wikidata Q43553540.
- Nagashima, Fumihiro; Kasai, Wakana; Kondoh, Masuo; Fujii, Makiko; Watanabe, Yoshiteru; Braggins, John Edward; Asakawa, Yoshinori (1 October 2003). "New ent-kaurene-type diterpenoids possessing cytotoxicity from the New Zealand liverwort Jungermannia species". Chemical and Pharmaceutical Bulletin. 51 (10): 1189–1192. doi:10.1248/CPB.51.1189. ISSN 0009-2363. PMID 14519928. Wikidata Q40629930.
- Large, Mark F.; Braggins, John E. (1 May 2004). Tree Ferns. Oregon: Timber Press. ISBN 0-88192-630-2. Wikidata Q126935644.
- Pócs, Tamás; Sass-Gyarmati, Andrea; Naikatini, Alifereti; Tuiwawa, Marika; Braggins, John; Pócs, Sarolta; von Konrat, Matt (2011). "New liverwort (Marchantiophyta) records for the Fiji Islands". Telopea. 13 (3): 455–494. ISSN 0312-9764. Wikidata Q126934652.
- Braggins, John; Renner, Matt; Lange, Peter de (25 August 2014). "Additions to the liverwort flora of the Kermadec Islands, New Zealand Botanical Region". Telopea. 17: 183–194. doi:10.7751/TELOPEA20147709. ISSN 0312-9764. Wikidata Q54746351.
