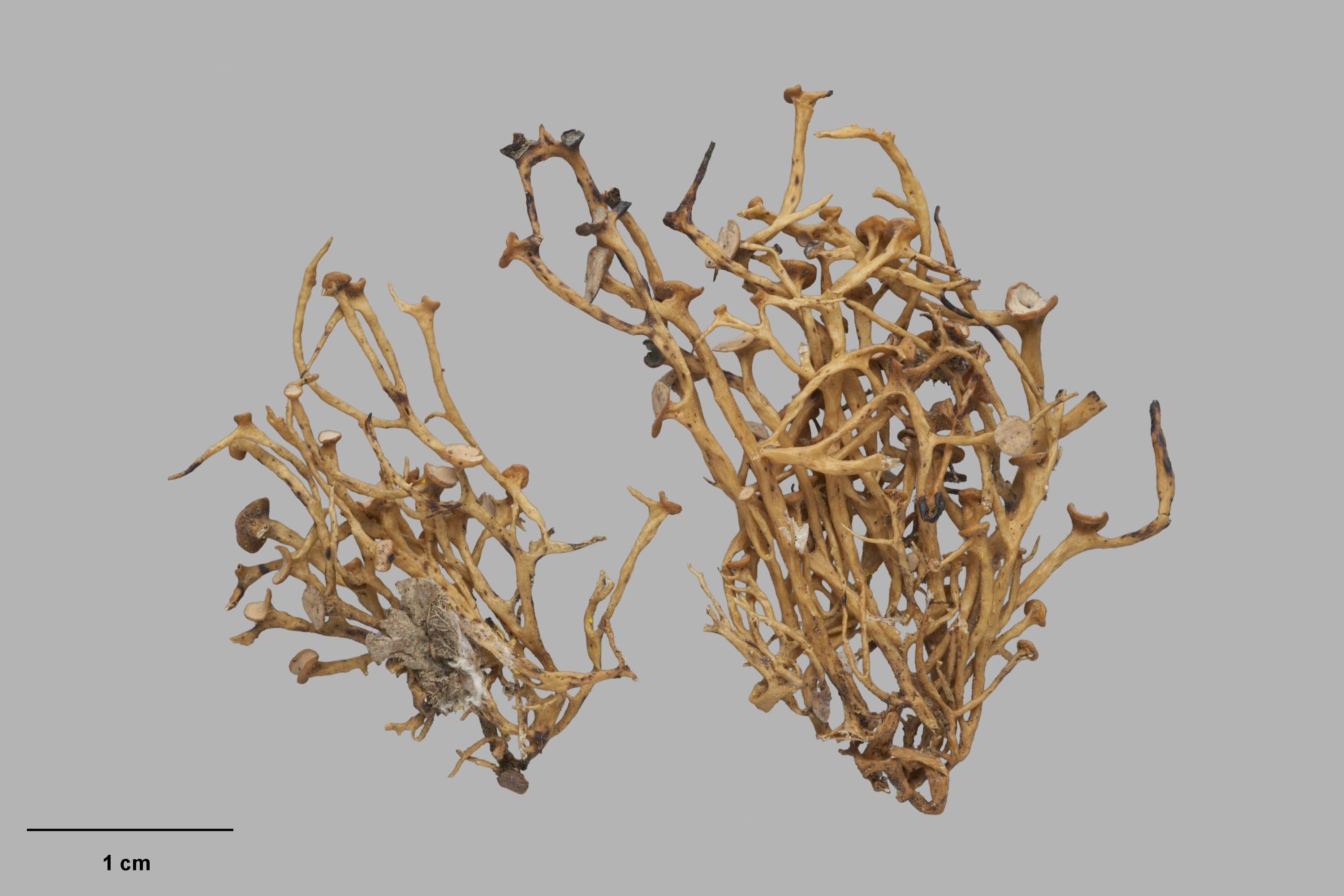
- Type specimen from Te Papa

Conservation status
- Naturally Uncommon (NZ TCS)

Scientific classification
- Kingdom: Fungi
- Division: Ascomycota
- Class: Lecanoromycetes
- Order: Lecanorales
- Family: Ramalinaceae
- Genus: Ramalina
- Species: R. riparia

Binomial name
- Ramalina riparia D.Blanchon, J.Braggins & A.Stewart

= Ramalina riparia =

Species of lichen-forming fungus

Ramalina riparia is a species of corticolous lichen (bark-dwelling) in the family Ramalinaceae. The species was described in 1996 by Dan Blanchon, John E. Braggins and Alison Stewart. It is found in the South Island of New Zealand.

== Description ==
Ramalina riparia is yellow green in colour, and has erect dense branches typically measuring between 1–3 cm (0.39–1.18 in) in height, with a width of up to 2 mm (0.079 in). The species is dichotomous, inflated, perforate, and has attenuate apices.

== Taxonomy ==
The species was first described in 1996 by Dan Blanchon, John E. Braggins and Alison Stewart. The species epithet "riparia" refers to the species often being found on the banks of streams or rivers.

== Distribution and habitat ==
The species is endemic to New Zealand, found in the South Island of New Zealand primarily in eastern Southland and the southern Otago Region, especially at the mouths of the Taieri River and Akatore River.

== Ecology ==
The species is corticolous, typically found in native forest remnants on river banks and forest margins, on the bark and twigs of trees such as Melicope simplex, Myrsine divaricata and species of Carmichaelia.

== See also ==
- List of Ramalina species
