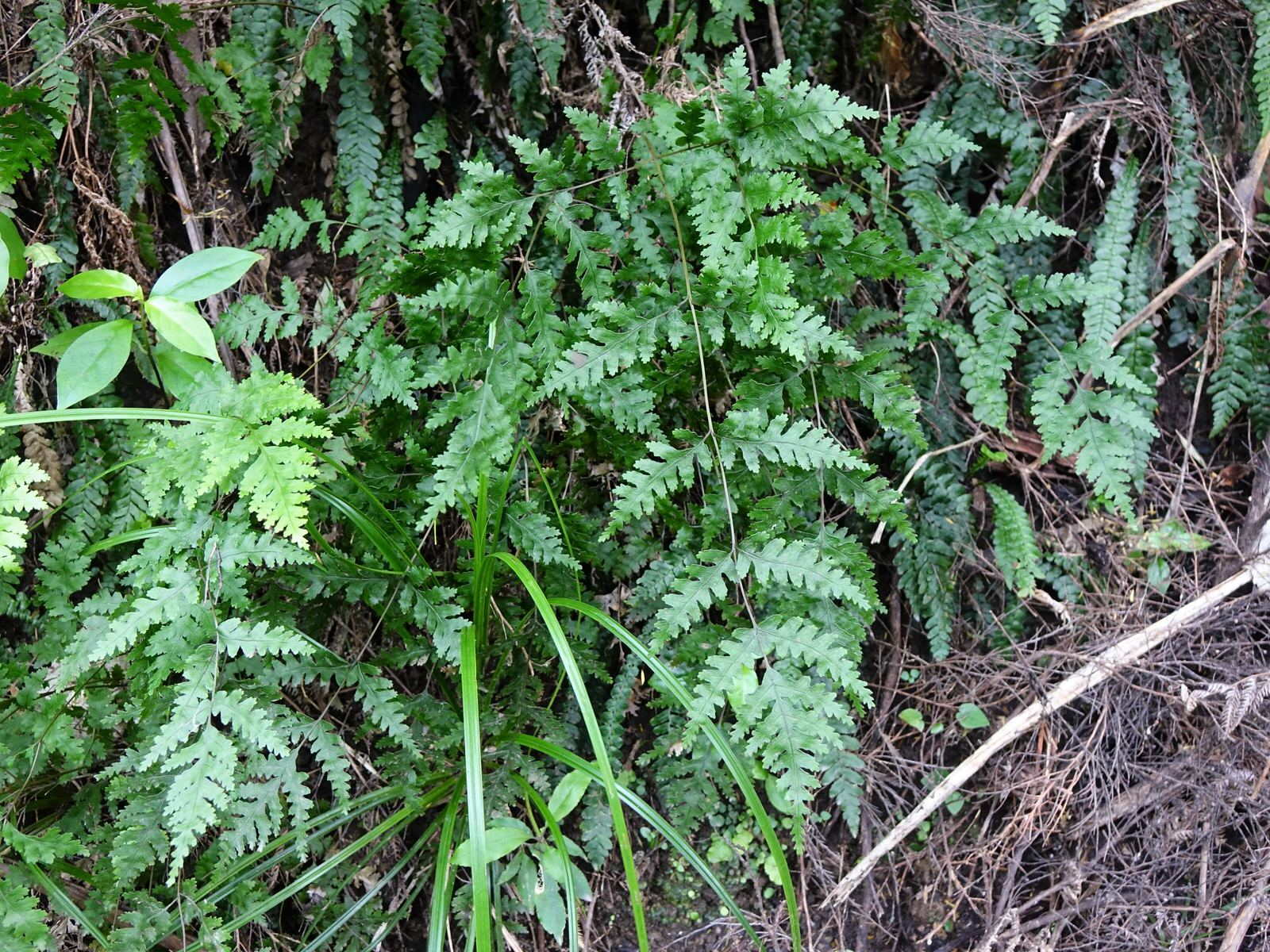
- Pteris carsei in the Waitākere Ranges

Scientific classification
- Kingdom: Plantae
- Clade: Tracheophytes
- Division: Polypodiophyta
- Class: Polypodiopsida
- Order: Polypodiales
- Family: Pteridaceae
- Genus: Pteris
- Species: P. carsei

Binomial name
- Pteris carsei Brownsey & Braggins, 2020

= Pteris carsei =

Species of plant

Pteris carsei is a species of fern native to New Zealand, including the Kermadec Islands. Originally considered a subtype of Pteris comans, the species was first formally described by Patrick Brownsey and John E. Braggins in 2020.

== Etymology ==
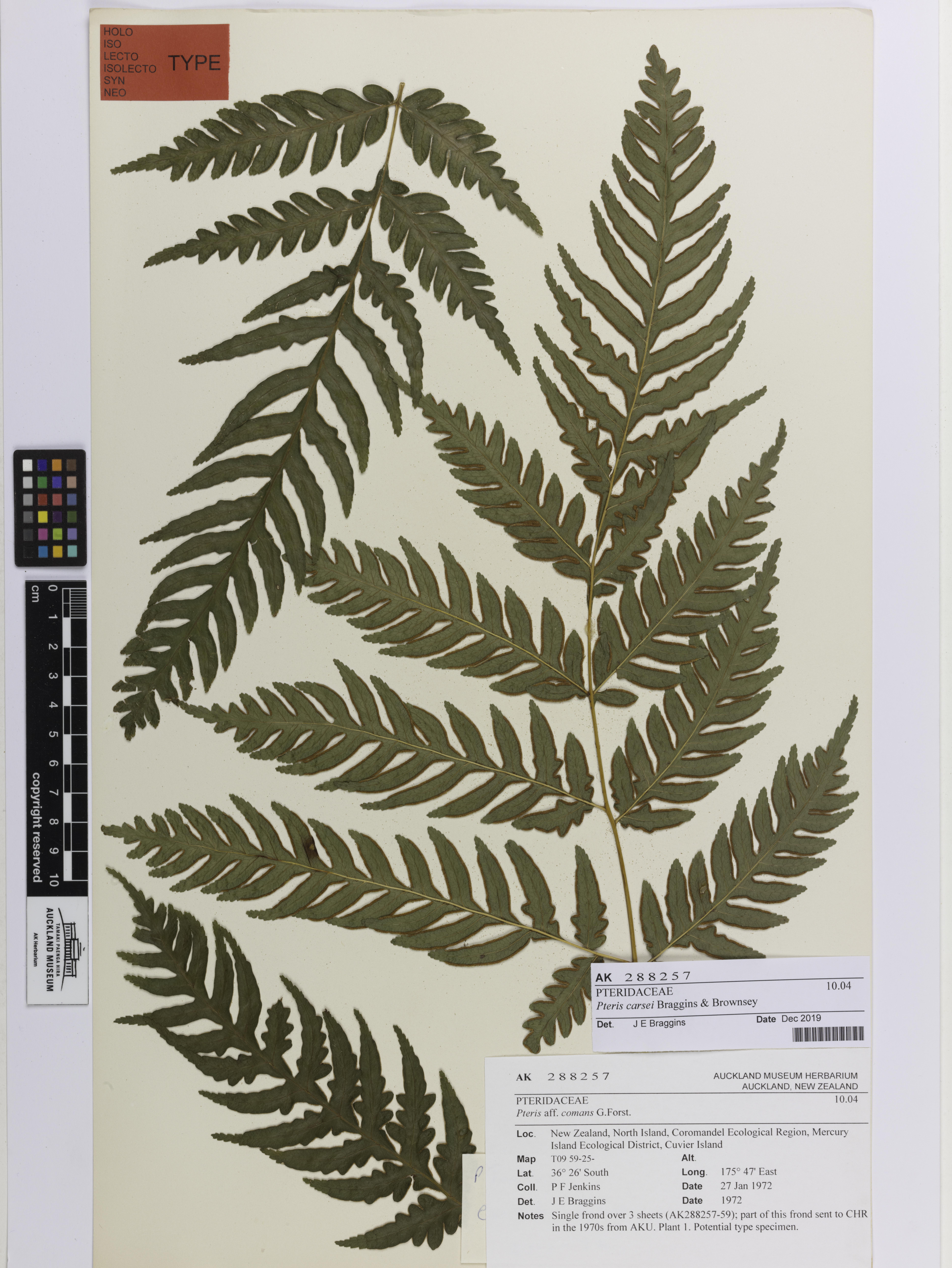
Holotype of Pteris carsei from the Auckland War Memorial Museum herbarium

The species was named after New Zealand teacher and amateur botanist Harry Carse.

== Taxonomy ==
Pteris carsei was first suggested to be a separate species from Pteris comans in John E. Braggins' 1975 thesis Studies on the New Zealand, and some related, species of Pteris L.. Specimens of P. carsei had been collected as early as 1832. In 2017, genetic differences were discovered between Australian specimens of P. comans and P. carsei, which prompted a review of Australasian Pteris species. Pteris carsei forms a clade with Pteris saxatilis, Pteris macilenta and more distantly Pteris epaleata.

== Description ==
Pteris carsei is a medium-large fern, with fronds extending as far as 150 cm (59 in) away from the rhizome. It can often be identified by its erect rhizome and laminae pattern.

== Distribution and habitat ==
Pteris carsei is endemic to New Zealand, occurring in the Three Kings Islands, coastal habitats on the North Island north of Mokau and the Coromandel Peninsula, and offshore islands north of the Coromandel Peninsula, as well as in the Kermadec Islands. It is found in open cliff, beachside and hillside areas, or in forest underneath Kunzea species (such as kanuka). The species is significantly more common on offshore islands than on the mainland of the North Island.
