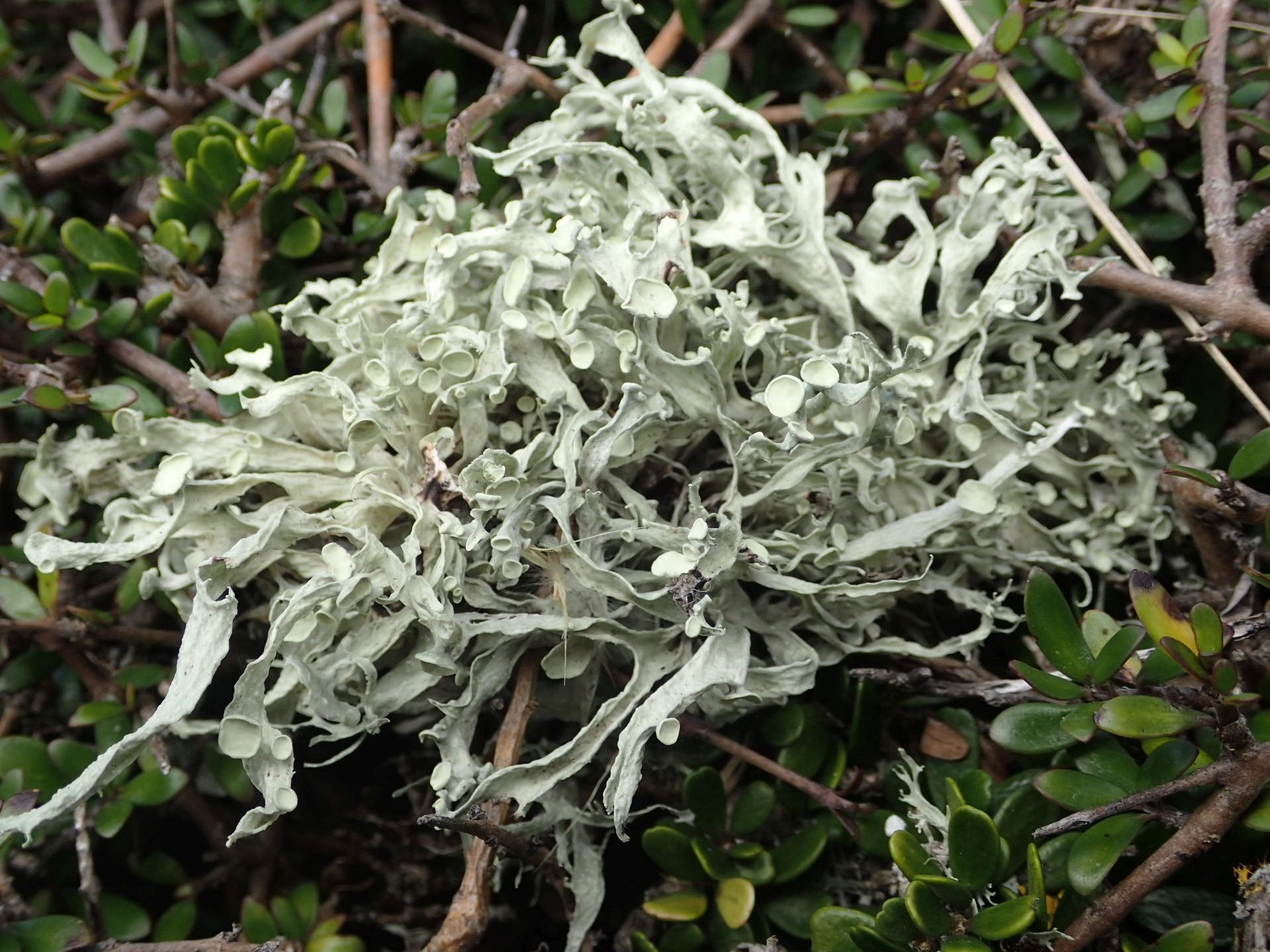

Conservation status
- Not Threatened (NZ TCS)

Scientific classification
- Kingdom: Fungi
- Division: Ascomycota
- Class: Lecanoromycetes
- Order: Lecanorales
- Family: Ramalinaceae
- Genus: Ramalina
- Species: R. inflexa

Binomial name
- Ramalina inflexa D.Blanchon, J.Braggins & A.Stewart

= Ramalina inflexa =

Species of lichen-forming fungus

Ramalina inflexa is a species of corticolous lichen (bark-dwelling) in the family Ramalinaceae. The species was described in 1996 by Dan Blanchon, John E. Braggins and Alison Stewart. It is found in the South Island of New Zealand.

== Description ==
Ramalina inflexa is pale green to yellow green in colour, and has erect branches typically measuring between 3–8.5 cm (1.2–3.3 in) in length, with a width of between 1–7 mm (0.039–0.276 in). The species is deeply canaliculate, has pointed apices, and usnic acid can be detected on specimens. It can be distinguished from Ramalina ovalis due to its canaliculate branches, dichotomous branching, and spurred apothecia (both marginal and subterminal).

== Taxonomy ==
The species was first described in 1996 by Dan Blanchon, John E. Braggins and Alison Stewart.

== Distribution and habitat ==
The species is endemic to New Zealand, found in the South Island of New Zealand between North Canterbury and Otago Region, in coastal areas up to 400 m (1,300 ft) above sea level.

== Ecology ==
The species is primarily corticolous, but can grow on rocks. The lichen primarily grows on introduced, exotic species including Salix × fragilis and Fraxinus excelsior, in areas of developed farmland, and can also grow on native species such as Coprosma areolata, Coprosma crassifolia and Sophora microphylla.

== Gallery ==
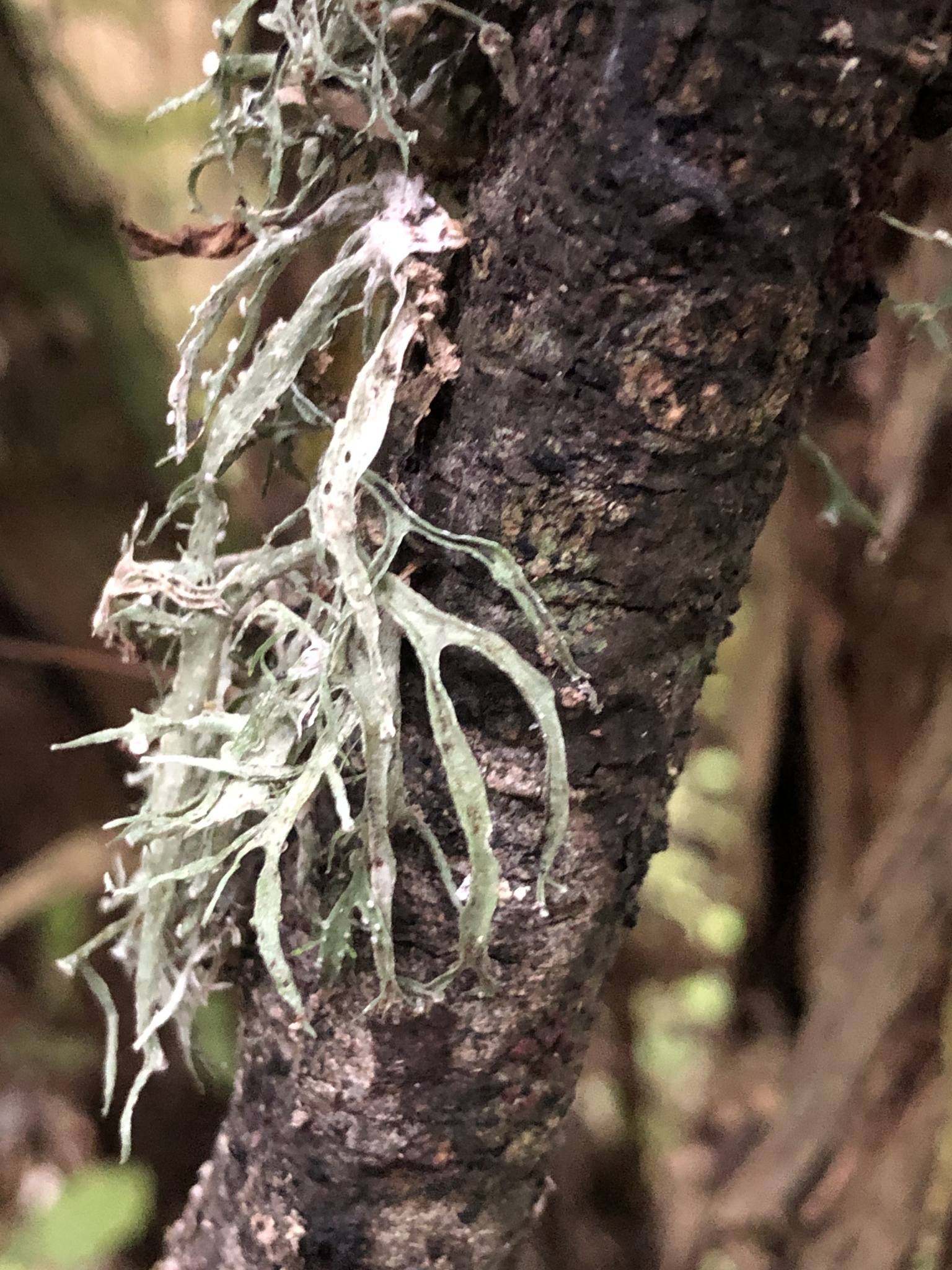

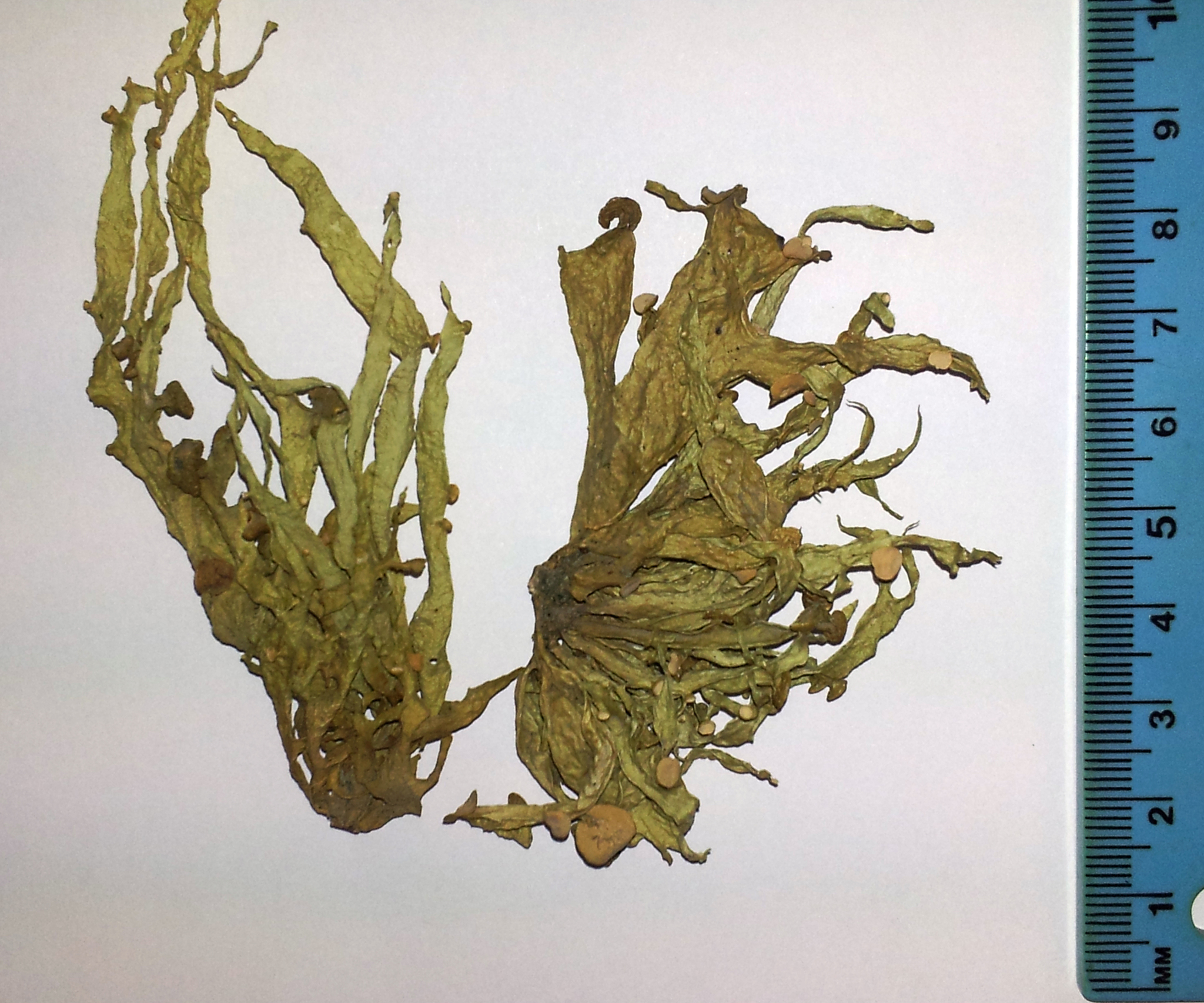

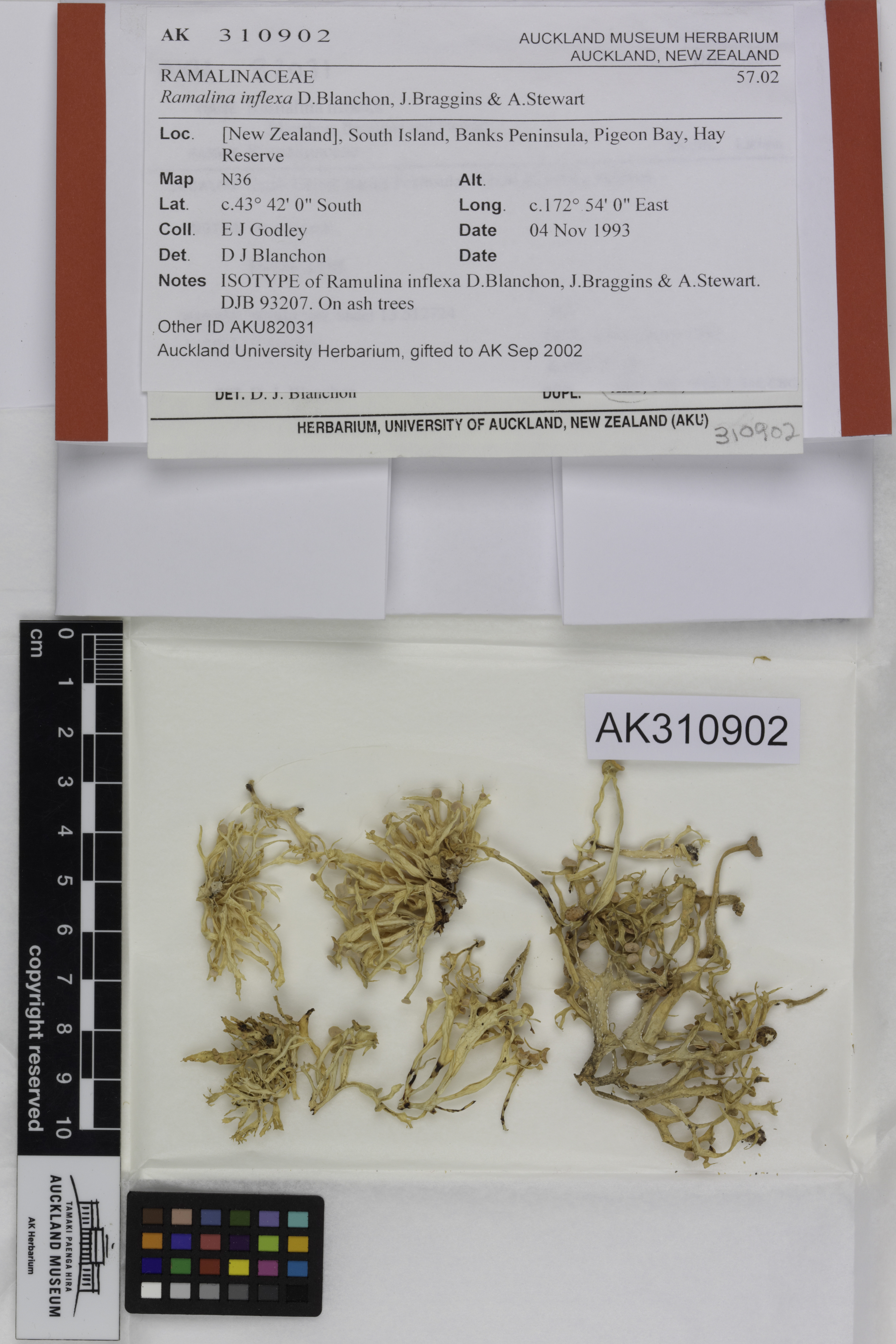

== See also ==
- List of Ramalina species
