= Beatrix Dobie =

New Zealand painter (1887–1944)

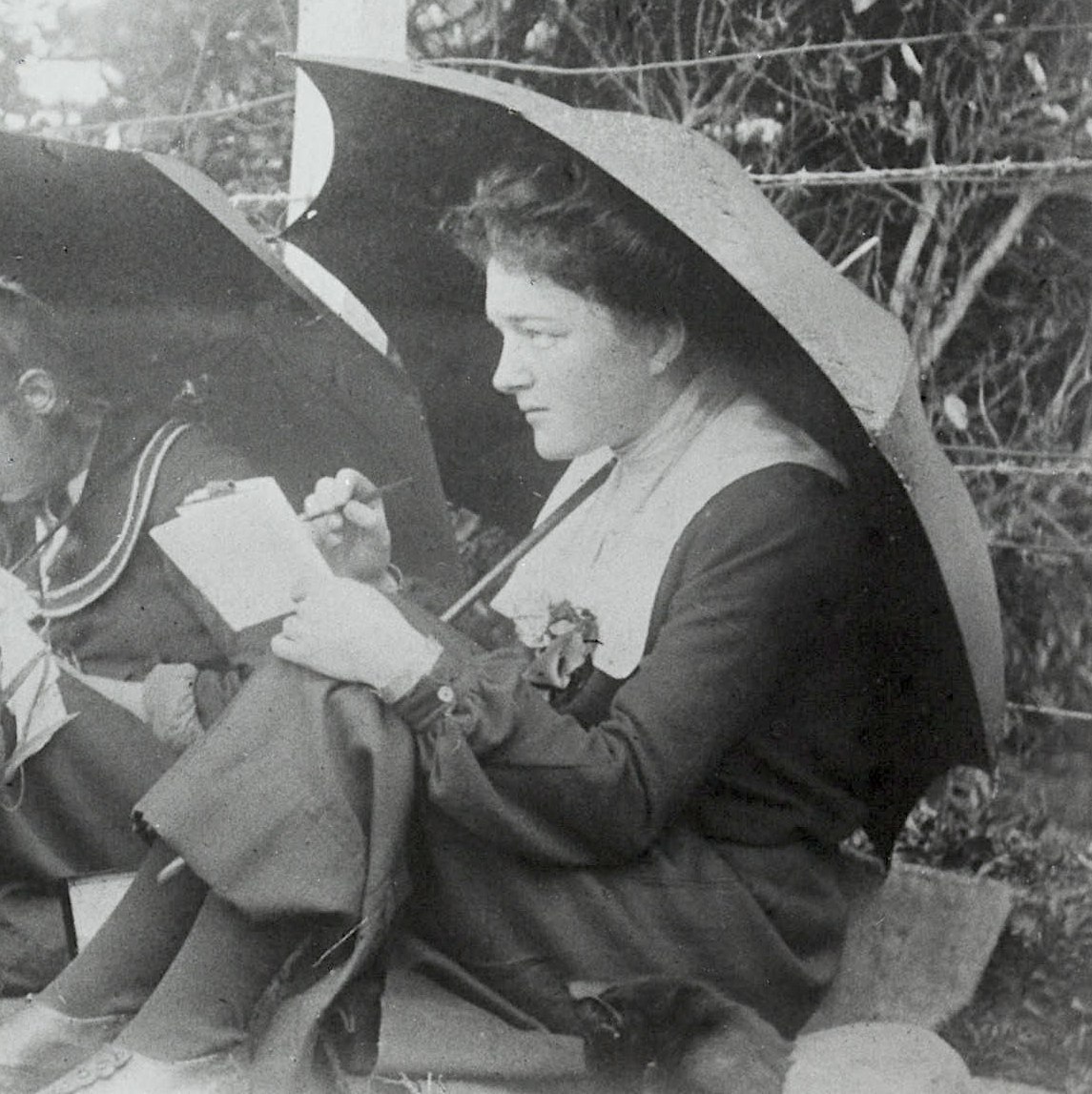
Beatrix Dobbie (later Dobie) with Muriel Wyman, Māngere, New Zealand, c. 1905.

Beatrix Charlotte Dobie (1887–1944) was a New Zealand landscape artist, most known for her illustrations in the work of conservationist Herbert Guthrie-Smith.

Dobie was born in Whangārei, New Zealand, in 1887. Her father was Herbert Boucher Dobbie, New Zealand amateur botanist and photographer, and her aunt was Mary Dobie. In 1911 she moved to London to study at the Slade School of Art, under Henry Tonks.

During the World War I she volunteered with her sister, Agatha, to become British Red Cross Voluntary Aid Detachment nurses. and was stationed in Malta and worked at a canteen near the No. 3 New Zealand General Hospital near Codford, England.

After the war she returned to live in New Zealand, exhibiting her work at the Canterbury Society of Arts Gallery. During this period she met Herbert Guthrie-Smith and formed the connection that would lead to her providing the illustrations for his book Tutira: the story of a New Zealand sheep station.

Valley of the Maungahinahina, a line drawing from 1921 edition of Tutira

In 1926 she toured Africa where she met her future husband, Rene Vernon, an engineer in the French Army. They settled in Tunisia where Dobie continued to paint. She sent her artwork to be exhibited in the Empire Exhibition in 1937.

She died in Tunisia in 1944. Her death was reported in New Zealand in the Auckland Star and Evening Post. The Post described her as a 'notable New Zealand artist' who had held 'an unusual and varied career.' She is known for her post-impressionist paintings of New Zealand landscapes and specifically, horses. Some of her work is held by the Auckland Art Gallery.
