= Alison Stewart (disambiguation) =

Alison Stewart is an American journalist.

Alison Stewart may also refer to:

- Alison Stewart (As the World Turns), a fictional character in an American soap opera
- Alison Stewart (biologist) (born 1957), New Zealand academic and plant pathologist
- Alison Hewson, née Stewart, Irish activist and businesswoman
