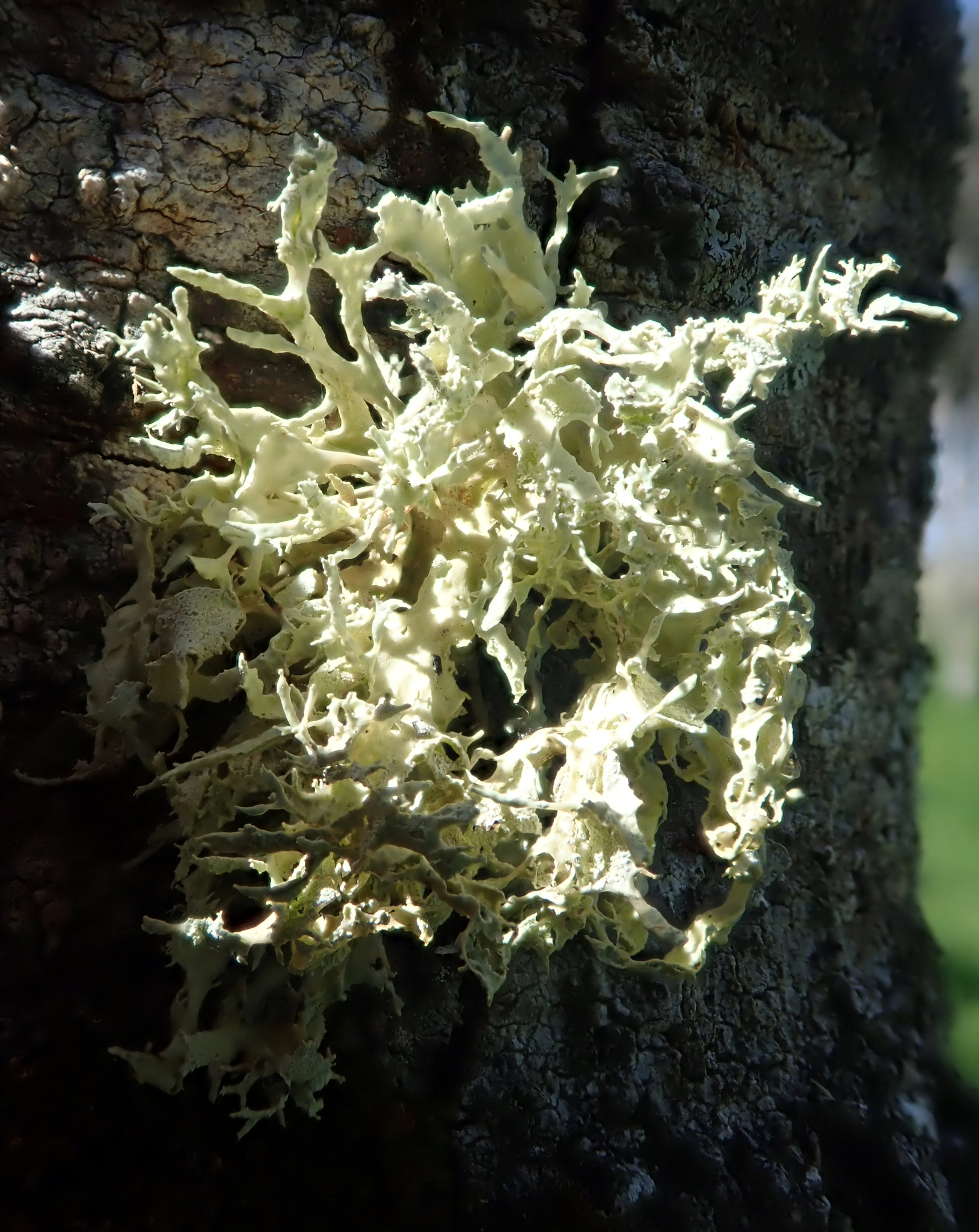

Conservation status
- Naturally Uncommon (NZ TCS)

Scientific classification
- Kingdom: Fungi
- Division: Ascomycota
- Class: Lecanoromycetes
- Order: Lecanorales
- Family: Ramalinaceae
- Genus: Ramalina
- Species: R. erumpens

Binomial name
- Ramalina erumpens D.Blanchon, J.Braggins & A.Stewart

= Ramalina erumpens =

Species of lichen-forming fungus

Ramalina erumpens is a species of corticolous lichen (bark-dwelling) in the family Ramalinaceae. Originally thought to be specimens of Ramalina pacifica, the species was identified as being distinct in 1996 by Dan Blanchon, John E. Braggins and Alison Stewart. It is found in New Zealand, and on Tasmania and Macquarie Island in Australia.

== Description ==
Ramalina erumpens is yellow-green in colour, and has erect flat branches typically measuring between 1–4.5 cm (0.39–1.77 in) in length, with a width of between 0.5–2 mm (0.020–0.079 in). The species had forked apices and marginal soralia, which are rimmed, round to ellipsoid, and produce fibrils.

== Taxonomy ==
The species was first described in 1996 by Dan Blanchon, John E. Braggins and Alison Stewart, noticing morphological differences in South Island specimens labelled as Ramalina pacifica. The species epithet erumpens is Latin for "breaking through". Two subspecies are known, Ramalina erumpens var. erumpens and Ramalina erumpens var. norstictica. The latter was identified as a subset type specimens of the lichen tested positive for norstictic acid and salazinic acid.

== Distribution and habitat ==
The species is found in the South Island of New Zealand, between Banks Peninsula and western Southland, typically in native forest remnants in coastal areas up to 400 m (1,300 ft) above sea level. In 2002, the species was found on Bird Island in the Foveaux Strait. Var. norstictica is found on the Otago Peninsula, where var. erumpens can also be found. In Australia, the species has been found on Tasmania and Macquarie Island.

== Ecology ==
The species is corticolous, found primarily on the bark of Dacrycarpus dacrydioides, but can also be found on other trees and shrubs.

== See also ==
- List of Ramalina species
