= Cyclone Bola =

Category 4 South Pacific cyclone in 1988

Severe Tropical Cyclone Bola
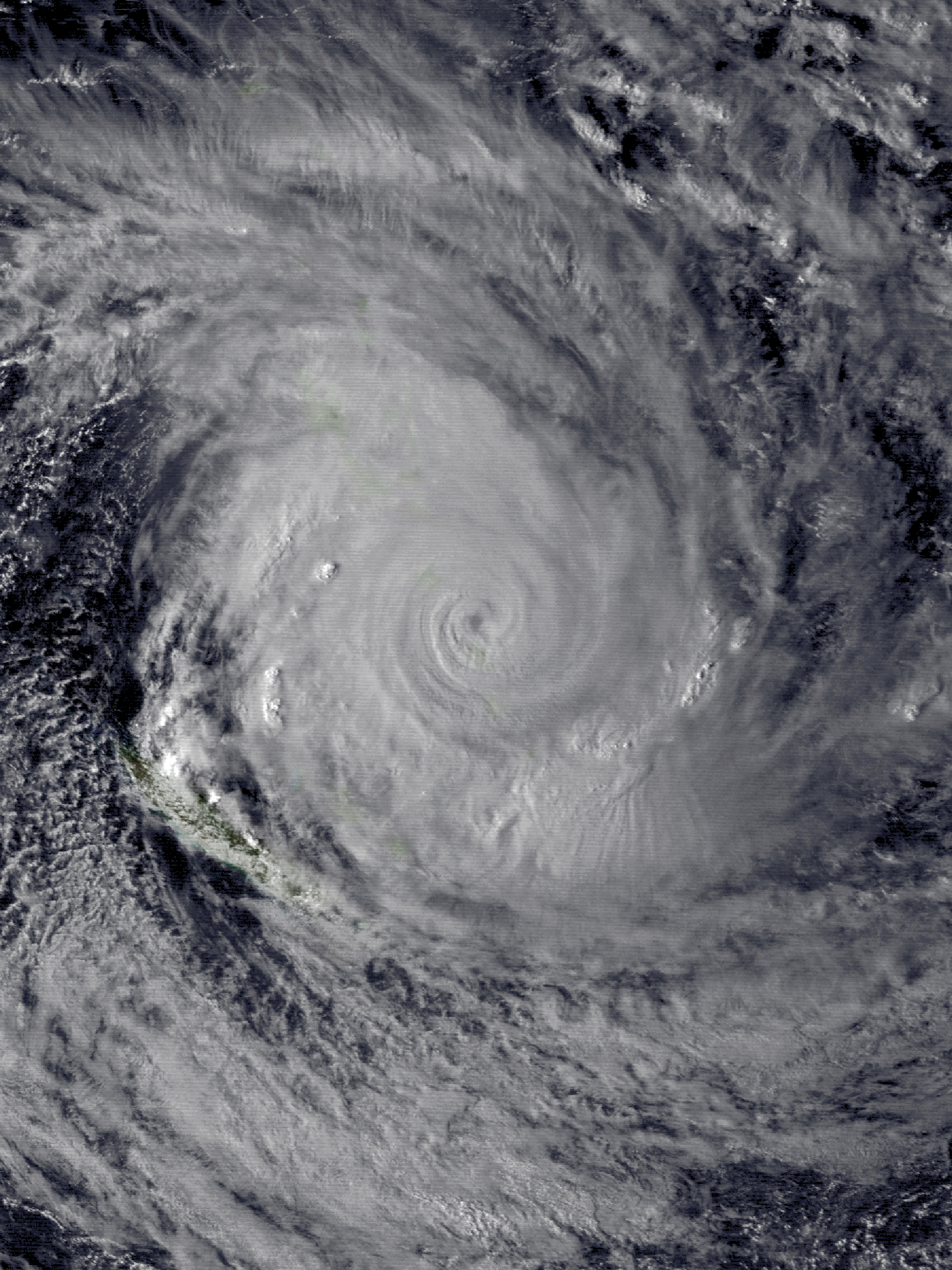
- Bola near peak intensity on 1 March

Meteorological history
- Formed: 23 February 1988
- Extratropical: 4 March 1988
- Dissipated: 12 March 1988

Category 4 severe tropical cyclone
- 10-minute sustained (MetService)
- Highest winds: 165 km/h (105 mph)
- Lowest pressure: 940 hPa (mbar); 27.76 inHg

Category 3-equivalent tropical cyclone
- 1-minute sustained (SSHWS/JTWC)
- Highest winds: 195 km/h (120 mph)
- Lowest pressure: 935 hPa (mbar); 27.61 inHg

Overall effects
- Fatalities: 15
- Damage: $82 million (1988 USD)
- Areas affected: Fiji, Vanuatu, New Zealand
- IBTrACS
- Part of the 1987–88 South Pacific cyclone season

Severe Tropical Cyclone Bola was one of the costliest cyclones in the history of New Zealand, causing severe damage as an extratropical cyclone when it passed near the country in March 1988. It formed on 24 February to the north of Fiji, and tracking generally southwestward it reached hurricane-force winds near Vanuatu on 28 February. The next day it generated peak wind velocities of 195 km/h (120 mph), though it quickly weakened as it accelerated southward. On 4 March, Bola transitioned into an extratropical storm, passing to the north of the North Island of New Zealand on 8 March. It weakened further and was absorbed by a stationary trough near the South Island on 12 March.

The cyclone first affected Fiji, where it produced gale-force winds and strong waves. In Vanuatu, Bola dropped heavy rainfall, which destroyed two bridges and caused severe damage to islands in the group. Bola caused severe damage to the North Island of New Zealand, where heavy rainfall peaked at 917 mm (36.1 in) in the Gisborne Region. Damage totaled over $82 million (1988 USD). Seven people were killed due to flooding, and hundreds were evacuated when a swollen river threatened Wairoa. In Whangaruru Harbour, Northland, an elderly male suffered a heart attack and died during the peak of the storm while attempting to tie down a neighbour's empty water tank.

== Meteorological history ==
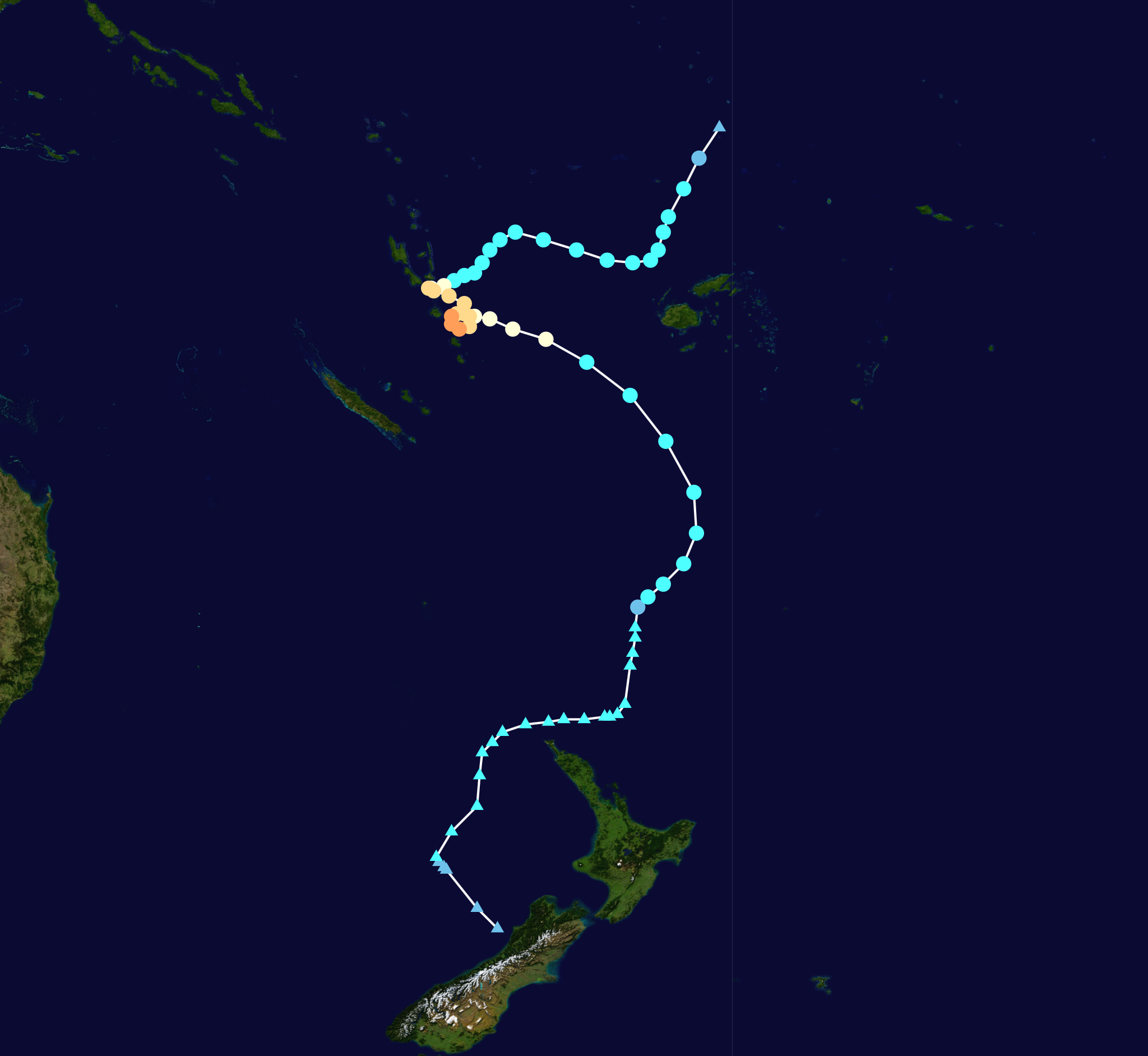
Map plotting the storm's track and intensity, according to the Saffir–Simpson scale Map key Saffir–Simpson scale Tropical depression (≤38 mph, ≤62 km/h) Tropical storm (39–73 mph, 63–118 km/h) Category 1 (74–95 mph, 119–153 km/h) Category 2 (96–110 mph, 154–177 km/h) Category 3 (111–129 mph, 178–208 km/h) Category 4 (130–156 mph, 209–251 km/h) Category 5 (≥157 mph, ≥252 km/h) Unknown Storm type Tropical cyclone Subtropical cyclone Extratropical cyclone, remnant low, tropical disturbance, or monsoon depression

The system that would become Severe Tropical Cyclone Bola was first noted on 23 February by the Fiji Meteorological Service (FMS) as a shallow depression that had developed within the South Pacific Convergence Zone just to the south of Tuvalu. During that day, the system moved south-westwards towards Fiji before the United States Joint Typhoon Warning Center (JTWC) initiated advisories on the depression and classified it as Tropical Cyclone 13P on 24 February. Over the next two days, the system gradually intensified as it continued to move south-westwards before the FMS reported that it had developed into a tropical cyclone and named it Bola at 05:00 UTC (17:00 FST) on 26 February. At this stage, the newly named system was located about 555 km (345 mi) to the northeast of Port Vila, Vanuatu and had entered a region of light and variable winds, which, along with an area of high pressure in the Tasman Sea, caused Bola to move west-northwestwards.

However, as Bola moved further southwards it on 27 February, which By this time Bola had become a category 2 tropical cyclone on the Australian scale, with wind speeds of between 95–110 km/h (60–70 mph) occurring near the centre. By 28 February, the system became a Category 3 severe tropical cyclone on the Australian scale, as it performed a small clockwise loop, between the Shepherd Islands and Efate. After completing its first cyclonic loop on 29 February, Bola started to move south-eastwards, before it performed a second cyclonic loop during the next day.

As it completed its second cyclonic loop on 2 March, the FMS reported that the system had peaked with 10-minute sustained wind speeds of 165 km/h (105 mph), which made it a Category 4 severe tropical cyclone on the Australian scale. The United States Joint Typhoon Warning Center also reported that the system had peaked with 1-minute sustained wind speeds of 195 km/h (120 mph), which made it equivalent to a category 3 hurricane on the Saffir-Simpson hurricane wind scale.

After reaching peak intensity, Cyclone Bola quickly weakened as it accelerated southeastward toward a frontal trough. On 3 March, its winds dropped below hurricane-force, and it gradually lost its tropical characteristics. The structure became asymmetric, with a large band of clouds extending well south of the circulation. By 4 March, Bola had completed the transition into an extratropical cyclone. It then turned south and began to affect the North Island of New Zealand on 6 March. A building ridge of high pressure to its south caused the extratropical remnants of Bola to slow and turn to the west on 7 March. The next day, the storm passed about 110 km (68 mi) north of the North Island. Around the same time, the storm began slowly filling, meaning the low pressure area associated with Bola was losing its identity. It turned southward on 9 March, and on 12 March was absorbed by a stationary trough in the Westerlies near the western coast of the South Island.

== Impact ==
=== Vanuatu ===
Cyclone Bola remained near Vanuatu for about a week, during which it reached its peak intensity while executing a cyclonic loop. The most affected locations were Epi island, the Shepherd Islands, and the islands in Malampa Province, and throughout the country the cyclone affected more than 15,000 people and 3,000 houses. In a five-day period the cyclone dropped about 450 mm (18 in) of rainfall. Two bridges on Malakula were destroyed, and several other bridges were flooded or damaged. The passage of the cyclone also left several buildings, roads, and crop fields damaged.

=== Fiji ===
Fiji was first affected by Bola on 25 February, while the system was within its developing stages. The system subsequently affected the island nation for a second time between 3 and 4 March. As it impacted the island nation for a second time, gale-force winds of up to 81 km/h (50 mph) and waves of up to 5 m (16 ft) were observed. Only very minor damage to sugarcane, pawpaws and other crops was reported, while the Fijian Government decided not to assess the damage caused by Bola. An open punt went missing between Kadavu and Vateule on 3 March, with six fishermen on board. All six fishermen were subsequently presumed dead after repeated air searches had failed to find them.

=== New Zealand ===
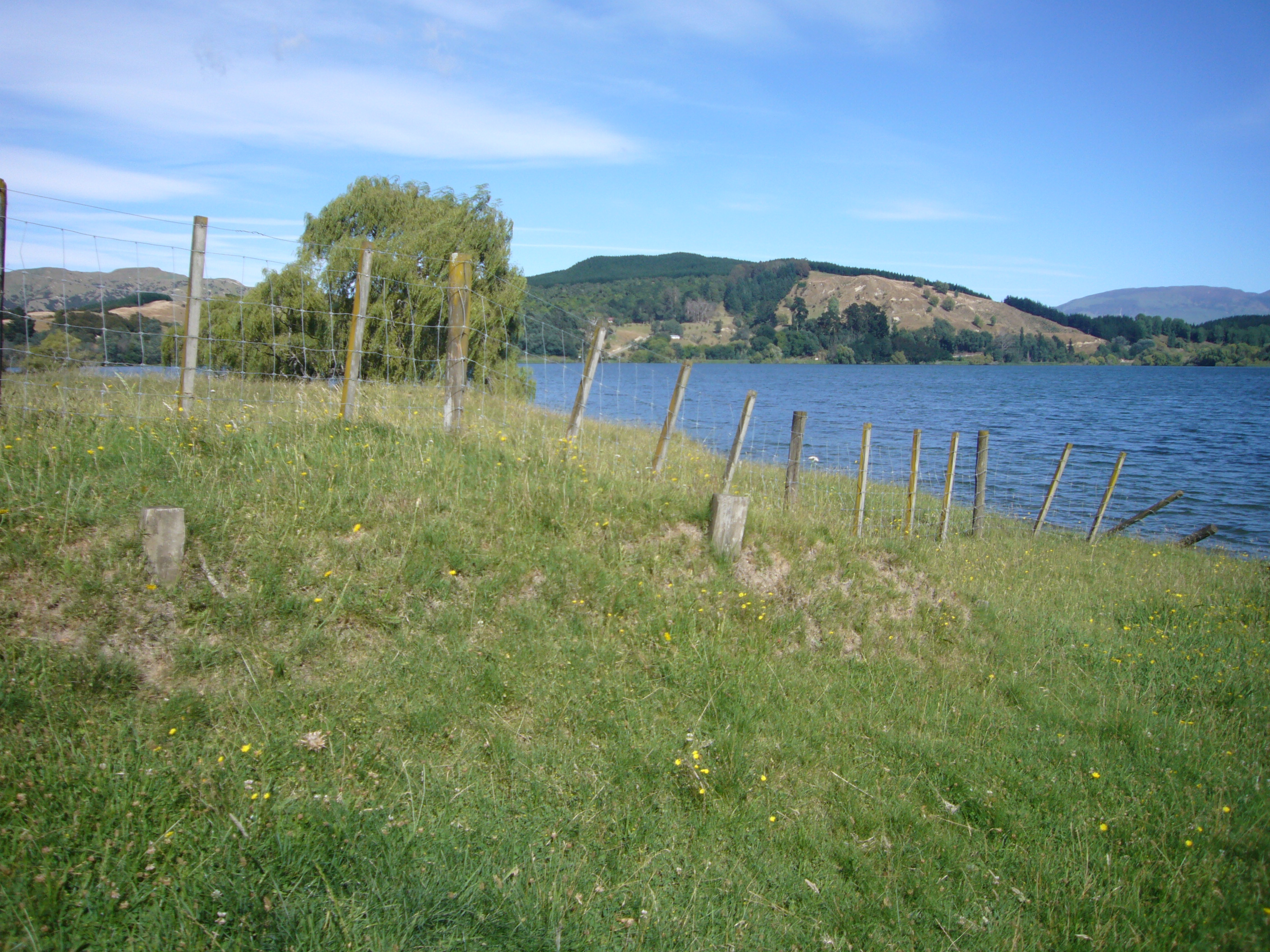
Fence posts buried alongside Lake Tūtira due to erosion caused by Cyclone Bola

Cyclone Bola created some of the largest rainfall totals for a single storm in the history of New Zealand, with some locations receiving more than half of their annual rainfall totals from the storm. While the cyclone passed north of the island, a strong easterly flow over the North Island contained the interaction between moist air from Bola and drier air from the ridge to its southeast. In the Gisborne region, the flow resulted in the heaviest rainfall totals, when the water ascended over the region's western mountainous areas and condensed into steam. One station recorded 419 mm (16.5 in) in a 24‑hour period. The maximum rainfall total attributed to the storm was 917 mm (36.1 in), reported at a station near Tolaga Bay. Heavy rainfall totals of up to and over 300 mm (12 in) were observed in the regions of Auckland and Northland. The cyclone is the largest to be recorded in 93 years of rainfall records. As such, it had a large and lasting effect on the rivers of the area when it deposited a large amount of sediment, as recorded in the sedimentary record of Lake Tūtira. Shortly prior to losing its identity, the remnants of Bola also dropped 100–200 mm (3.9–7.9 in) of precipitation on the South Island of New Zealand.

Storm damage was heaviest in Gisborne, where rain destroyed or damaged several roads and bridges. Three days of continuous rainfall led to mudslides, flooding, and erosion. Seven people drowned in the flooding. In Te Karaka in Gisborne, a flooded river forced 500 residents to evacuate. A total of 1,765 farmers were affected by the flooding, accounting for about 3,600 hectares (8,900 acres) of damaged crop fields and about $90 million in crop damage (1988 NZD$, 82 million 1988 USD). Water supplies were disrupted in two cities due to flooding. Rainfall in Northland Region caused flooding and outages to telephone and power. Additionally, beginning on about 6 March, the cyclone began affecting the North Island with strong easterly winds of over hurricane force, caused by the interaction between the extratropical remnants of Bola and a ridge of high pressure to its south. The winds damaged a few homes, including some in which the roofs were damaged or destroyed. In addition, the strong winds downed several trees, and at the same time, erosion and landslides left hillsides bare without grass or trees.

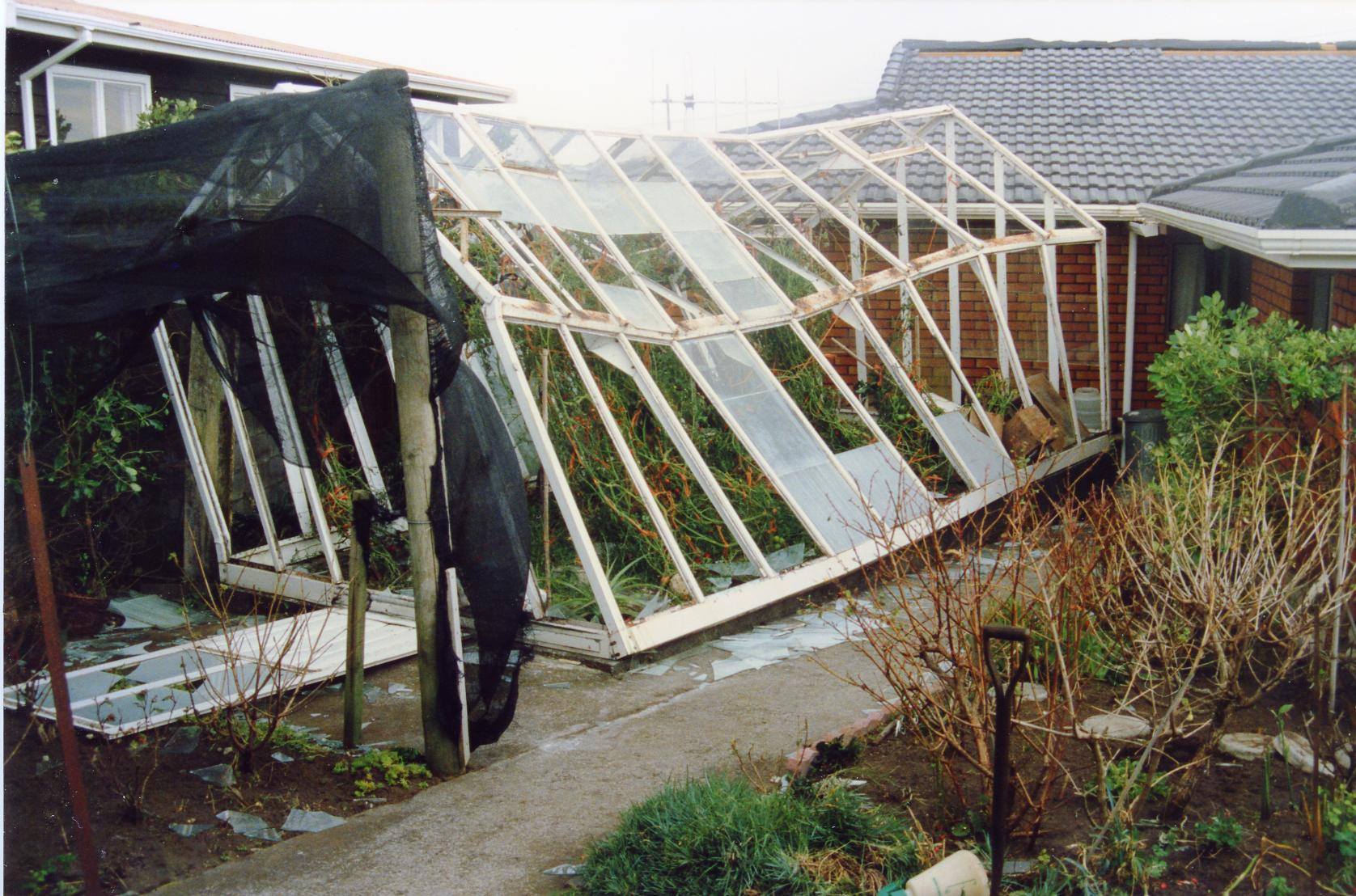
Wind damage to a greenhouse in New Plymouth

Crop and stock losses were high and among the thousands of people who fled three people died when their car was washed away by floodwaters. The government responded with Michael Bassett, the Minister of Civil Defence, flying to Gisborne on 8 March in an air force plane (the airport was closed to normal passenger flights). There he met with Colin Moyle, the Minister of Agriculture, to organise restoring water and food supplies to the area. On 11 March, Prime Minister David Lange flew in an air force helicopter to areas north of Gisborne to accompany a mission to drop supplies to stranded people. At the final destination Lange famously was met by a farmers wife wearing a pink nightgown and gumboots who burst into tears of relief when presented with an aid package by Lange. After regular warm summer weather resumed, with fresh running water connection still not fully reestablished, a health scare developed. Lange insisted on having a member of his personal staff in Gisborne, which inadvertently cut across lines of command established by Ed Latter, the Director of Civil Defence, causing confusion. After the dissipation of the cyclone a rebuilding effort was begun in Gisborne which benefitted the town. Agriculture losses amounted to $90 million and the government's repair bill was more than $111 million. Many farms in Taranaki converted from horticulture to dairy farming.

The Royal New Zealand Navy Frigate HMNZS Waikato sailed from Newcastle Australia to Auckland NZ when all merchant shipping had been stopped and encountered Cyclone Bola in the Tasman Sea. Waikato was a day late reaching Auckland and suffered some heavy damage, with crew members still often talking about the passage back to New Zealand, likening it to being tossed about like a cork in the heavy seas.

== Aftermath ==
In Vanuatu, cyclone victims received food and emergency aid following the storm. Australian patrol boat HMAS Cessnock provided manpower assistance to 11 islands in the country. Reconstruction costs in Vanuatu totalled about $5 million (1988 USD), which was about 10 percent of the country's national budget.

After the passage of the storm, four towns in New Zealand declared states of emergency. The New Zealand government provided about $80 million (1988 NZD) to the east coast region of the North Island for assisting in cyclone damage. $8 million was used to create an East Coast Forestry Conservation Scheme, which was set to protect forests and prevent erosion. A study was taken five years after the storm, consisting of a group of 112 people who were evacuated or received monetary assistance in response to the cyclone; the study showed 12% of the respondents as experiencing Posttraumatic stress disorder, of which they reported a general lack of assistance and public support.

The name Bola was later retired, meaning it will not be used again within the same basin.

== See also ==
- Cyclone Donna (2017)
- Cyclone Gabrielle (2023) – the costliest tropical cyclone on record in the South Pacific basin, which also severely affected New Zealand like Bola
