= Biological and Pharmaceutical Bulletin =

- Discipline: Pharmaceutical science; Health sciences
- Language: English
- Edited by: Atsushi Matsuzawa

Publication details
- Former name(s): Biological & Pharmaceutical Bulletin (1993-2011)
- History: 1993-present
- Publisher: Pharmaceutical Society of Japan (Japan)
- Frequency: Monthly
- Open access: Yes
- Impact factor: 1.7 (2023)

Standard abbreviations
- ISO 4: Biol. Pharm. Bull.

Indexing
- CODEN: BPBLEO
- ISSN: 0918-6158 (print); 1347-5215 (web)
- OCLC no.: 27784830

Links
- Journal homepage

Biological and Pharmaceutical Bulletin (BPB) is a monthly peer-reviewed medical journal published by the Pharmaceutical Society of Japan. The journal was established in 1993 as the successor to The Journal of Pharmacobio-Dynamics (established in 1978). In 2012, the society re-organized its journals, and most material published in the Journal of Health Science now started to be published in Biological and Pharmaceutical Bulletin and with some being published in its sister publication Chemical and Pharmaceutical Bulletin. The editor in chief is Atsushi Matsuzawa (Graduate School of Pharmaceutical Sciences, Tohoku University).

== Abstracting and indexing ==
Biological and Pharmaceutical Bulletin is abstracted and indexed in the following databases:

- Biosis
- Chemical Abstracts Core
- Chimica
- MEDLINE
- Veterinary Science Database
- Science Citation Index Expanded
- Scopus
