= Journal of Health Science =

- Discipline: Health science
- Language: English, Japanese

Publication details
- Former name(s): Eisei Kagaku; Kōshū Eisei Nenpō
- History: 1956–2011
- Publisher: Pharmaceutical Society of Japan
- Frequency: Bimonthly

Standard abbreviations
- ISO 4: J. Health Sci.

Indexing
- Journal of Health Science
- CODEN: JHSCFD
- ISSN: 1344-9702 (print); 1347-5207 (web)
- LCCN: 00-243019
- Eisei Kagaku
- CODEN: JJTHEC
- ISSN: 0013-273X

Links
- Journal homepage

Journal of Health Science was a Japanese peer-reviewed medical journal of health science. It was originally established as Eisei Kagaku in 1956 (itself a continuation of the earlier Kōshū Eisei Nenpō), but renamed itself to its final title in 1999. Publication continued until 2011. In 2012, the society re-organized its journals, and most material started to be published in the sister publication Biological and Pharmaceutical Bulletin, with some being published in Chemical and Pharmaceutical Bulletin.

The journal is indexed in Agricultural & Environmental Science Database, Aquatic Sciences and Fisheries Abstracts (ASFA), and Pollution Abstracts. It was covered in Scopus from 1999 to 2011, as was its predecessor from 1958 to 1999, skipping 1962.
