= Lake Tūtira =

Body of Water in New Zealand

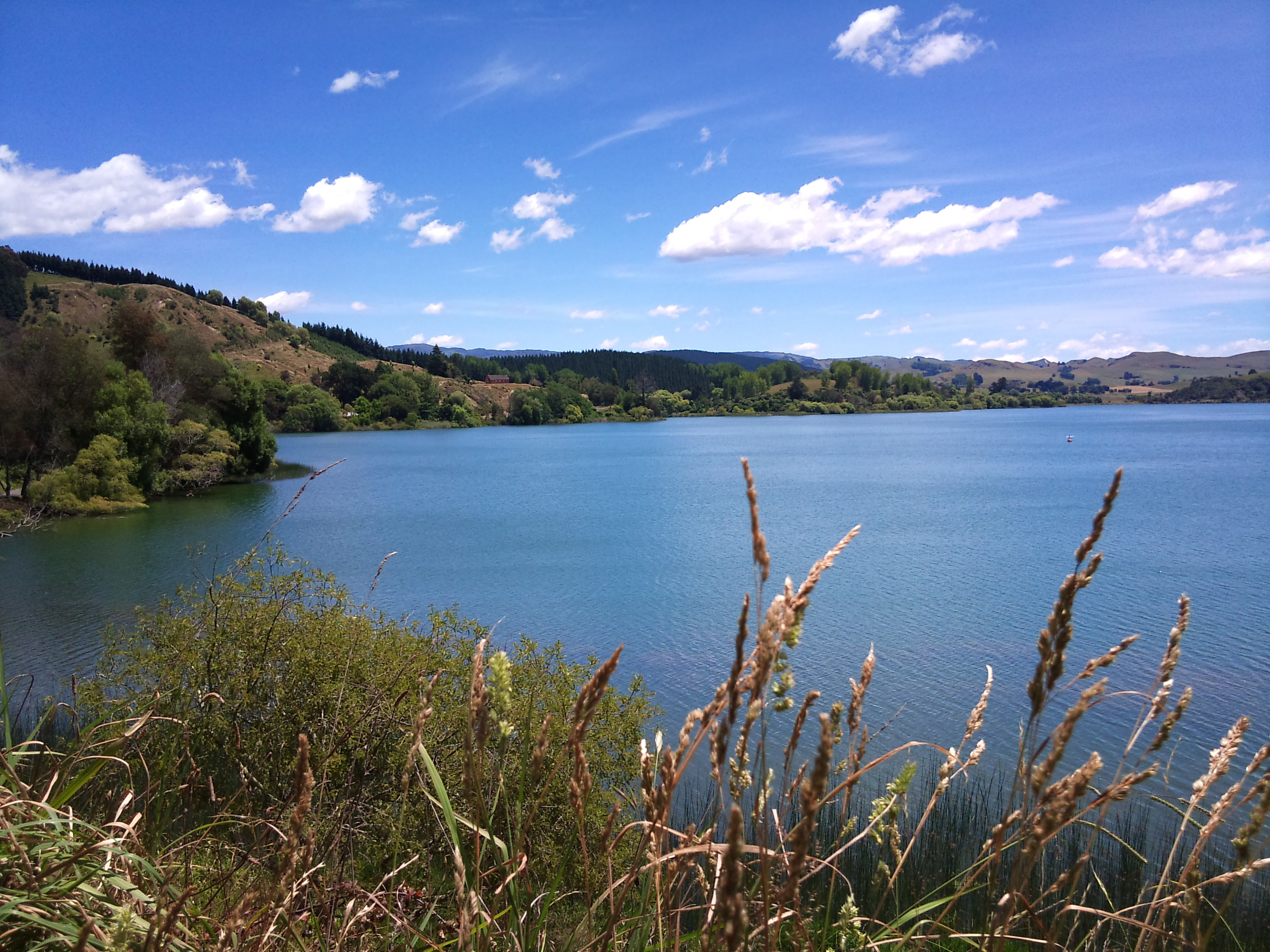
- Lake Tutira in 2009
- Interactive map of Lake Tūtira
- Location: Hawke's Bay, North Island
- Coordinates: 39.222°S 176.893°E
- Type: mesotrophic
- Catchment area: 27 km^{2} (10 sq mi)
- Basin countries: New Zealand
- Surface area: 1.74 km^{2} (0.67 sq mi)
- Average depth: 20.8 m (68 ft)
- Max. depth: 42 m (138 ft)
- Residence time: 2 years
- Surface elevation: 150 m (490 ft)
- Islands: 1

Lake Tūtira is a body of water in north-eastern Hawke's Bay in New Zealand, formed by damming of Papakiri Stream by two landslides from a limestone capped cliff on the east.

Much of the area was surveyed by Herbert Guthrie-Smith, who farmed 60,000 acres (240 km²) surrounding the lake. Guthrie-Smith, a naturalist, published the popular Tutira: the story of a New Zealand sheep station in 1921. Today, a camp is run at the site of his homestead.

A small settlement, Tutira, is located near the lake, on State Highway 2 30 kilometres north of Whirinaki.

The lake has an artificial island, Tauranga-Koau, which is located off the east shore of the lake. Tauranga-Koau contained an island pā, which was the site of an attack by Te Urewera, who utilised mōkihi (rafts) to attack the Ngāti Tatara inhabitants. After the attack, Ngāti Tatara was known as Ngāti Kurumōkihi, which translates to 'Those attacked by rafts.'

Sedimentary cores from the lake were used to demonstrate that the landslides mobilising sediments for transport into the lake occur in frequency and magnitude according to a power law.

Trout fishing is permitted as a stream flows into its northern reaches. For centuries Māori seasonally lived by Lake Tūtira and it is possible to see the remains of six pa sites. The Tutira Walkway, ascends to the Table Mountain trig station for views over Hawke's Bay and takes about five hours to complete.

Land Air Water Aotearoa describes the water quality as "poor", specifically showing eutrophic lake conditions. The lake suffers from periodic algal blooms.

In 2023, the lake was in a poor condition and not safe for swimming as a result of algal blooms caused by high temperatures, runoff from farms, and nutrient-rich inflows during heavy rains.

== Geological history ==
The lake contains a high-resolution record of the sedimentation since its formation about 6,500 years ago. It has a small catchment area, whose dominant erosion mechanism is landsliding; as a result of this, infrequent, large storms account for the bulk of the sedimentary depositional volume; Cyclone Bola is a particularly important recent example.
