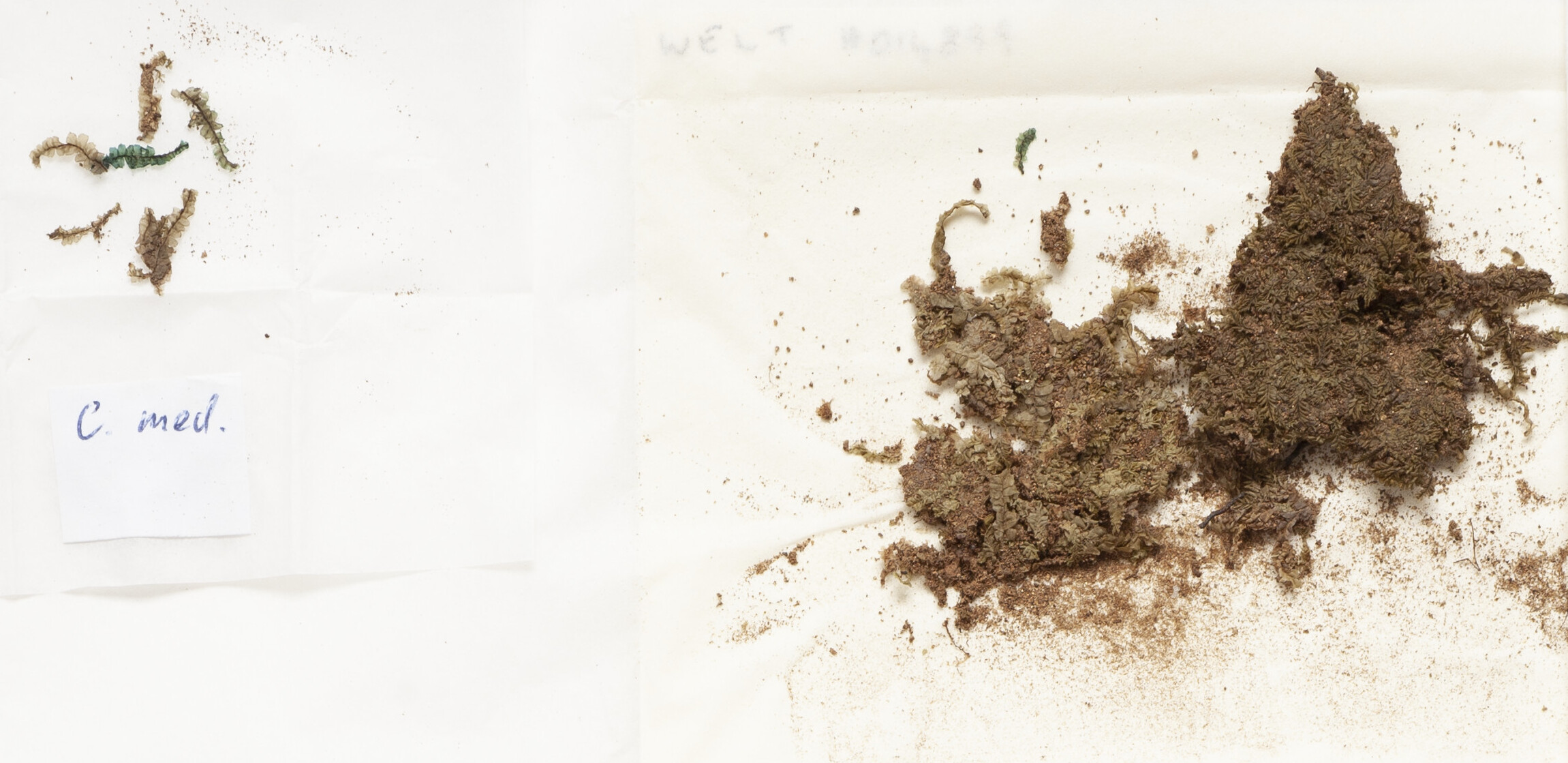
- Type specimen of Chiloscyphus mediinfrons from the collections of Te Papa

Scientific classification
- Kingdom: Plantae
- Division: Marchantiophyta
- Class: Jungermanniopsida
- Order: Lepidoziales
- Family: Lophocoleaceae
- Genus: Lophocolea
- Species: L. mediinfrons

Binomial name
- Lophocolea mediinfrons (J.J.Engel & Braggins) L.Söderstr.

Synonyms
- Chiloscyphus mediinfrons

= Lophocolea mediinfrons =

Species of liverwort

Lophocolea mediinfrons is a species of liverwort in the family Lophocoleaceae. The plant was first described by John J. Engel and John E. Braggins in 2010 as Chiloscyphus mediinfrons, and has only been found on Ulva Island in New Zealand.

== Taxonomy ==
The species was first identified by J.J. Engel and John E. Braggins in 2010 as Chiloscyphus mediinfrons. In 2013, the genus Lophocolea was revived as being separate from the wider Chiloscyphus, and the species was recombined as Lophocolea mediinfrons.

== Description ==
Lophocolea mediinfrons has a soft, spongy and waxy appearance, ranging from pale green to pale brown in colour. Distinctive features of the species include variable leaf apices, and a leaf-free stem cell gutter.

== Distribution and habitat ==
Lophocolea mediinfrons has only been identified as occurring at Flagstaff Point at the northeastern end of Ulva Island, near Stewart Island in New Zealand. The plants formed a forest floor mat underneath a southern rātā and kāmahi-dominated forest, and were found alongside the liverwort species Zoopsis argentea.
