= Herbert Guthrie-Smith =

New Zealand farmer, author and conservationist (1862–1940)

Herbert Guthrie-Smith FRSNZ
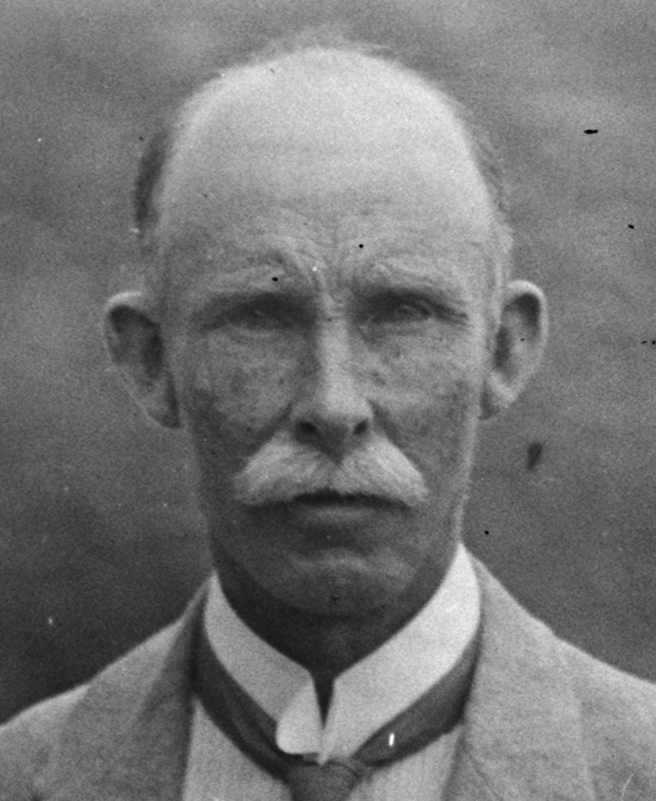
- Guthrie-Smith c. 1912
- Born: William Herbert Smith; 13 March 1862; Helensburgh, Scotland
- Died: 4 July 1940 (aged 78); Tutira, New Zealand
- Occupations: New Zealand farmer, author and conservationist
- Notable work: Tutira: The Story of a New Zealand Sheep Station
- Spouse: Georgina Meta Dennistoun Brown (married 1901)
- Awards: Fellow of the Royal Society of New Zealand (FRSNZ)

William Herbert Guthrie-Smith FRSNZ (13 March 1862 – 4 July 1940) was a New Zealand farmer, author, botanical collector and conservationist.

== Life ==
William Herbert Smith was born in Helensburgh, Scotland in 1862. His father was an insurance broker.

In 1880 he emigrated to New Zealand. In September 1882 he leased Tutira, a sheep station in central Hawke's Bay, which was his home for the rest of his life. In 1901 Guthrie-Smith married Georgina Meta Dennistoun Brown in Scotland. Their daughter, Barbara, was born in 1903.

After the First World War he met Beatrix Dobie who was exhibiting her work at the Canterbury Society of Arts Gallery. They formed the connection that would lead to her providing the illustrations for his book Tutira: The Story of a New Zealand Sheep Station.

His books and photography, especially Tutira: The Story of a New Zealand Sheep Station, graphically document the impacts of human activity on New Zealand's unique environment.

Tutira: The Story of a New Zealand Sheep Station' was published in 1921 (and reprinted in 1926 with a new preface, map and index). It documented the impact of humans on New Zealand's environment in an easy reading, non-scientific yet accurate manner. It is an internationally acclaimed classic of ecological writing and was New Zealand's first significant environmentalist publication. In 2003 Michael King wrote:

“Our first ecological book, and still our best example of this genre. The transformation of New Zealand from bushlands to grasslands farming is anatomised in this close examination of the effects of plant and animal introductions on one piece of Hawke’s Bay.”

Before his death in 1940 he revised and added to Tutira. The revised edition was published in 1953.

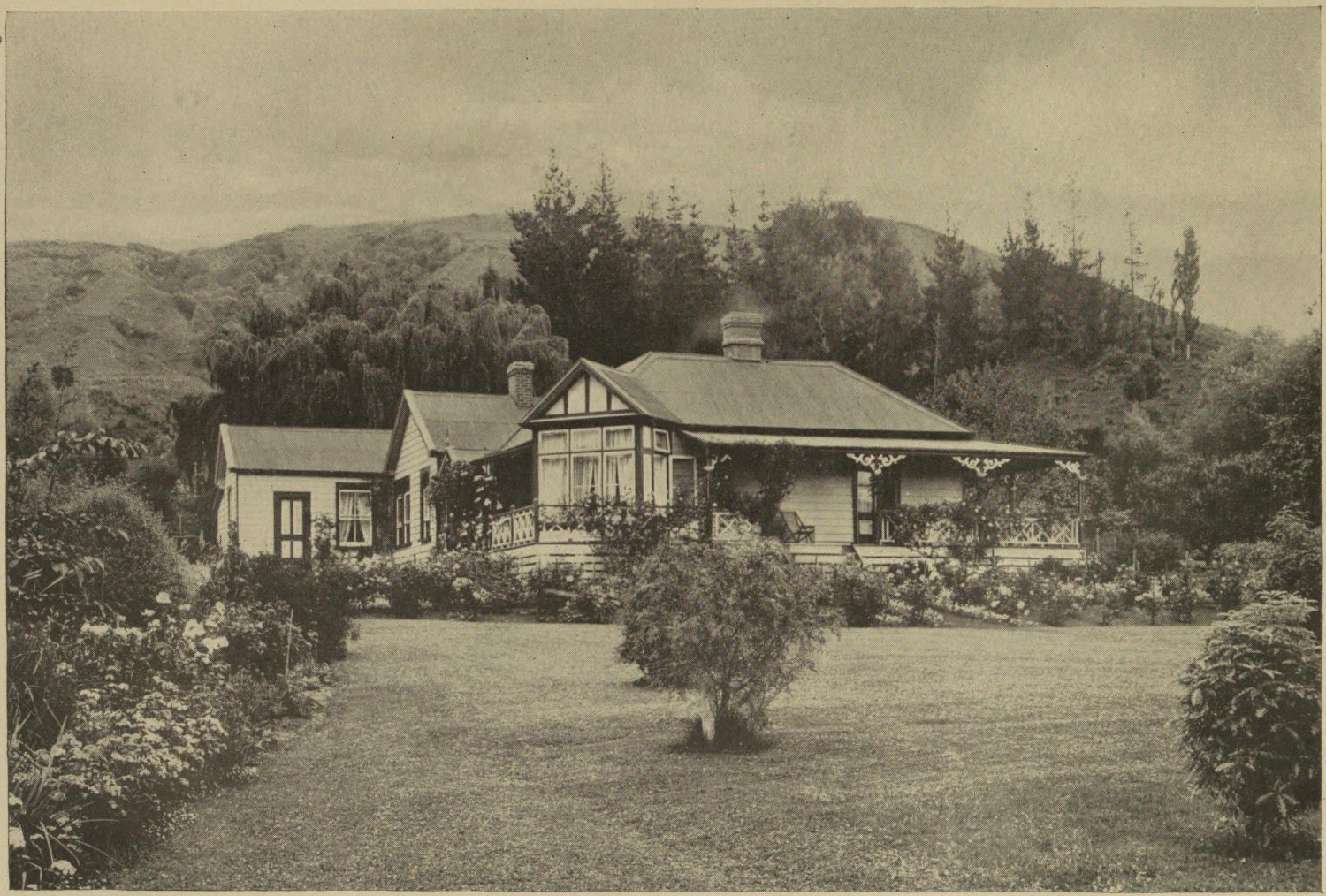
Tutira Homestead

Guthrie-Smith died on 4 July 1940 at Tutira. He was buried at Tutira, and his obituary appears in Transactions and Proceedings of the Royal Society of New Zealand 1868–1961 (Vol 70 1940–41).

== Awards and honours ==
William Herbert Guthrie-Smith was elected as a Fellow of the Royal Society of New Zealand (known as the New Zealand Institute before 1933) in 1924 (listed under S, rather than G on the Royal Society website).

New Zealand botanist Donald Petrie named the grass species Poa guthrie-smithiana (now known as P. colensoi) after him.

== Bibliography ==
Books:

- Tutira: The Story of a New Zealand Sheep Station
- Birds of the Water, Wood and Waste
- Mutton Birds and Other Birds
- Bird Life on Island and Shore
- Sorrows and Joys of a New Zealand Naturalist

Journal papers:

- Bird-Life on a Run
- The Grasses of Tutira

== Guthrie-Smith Trust ==
The Guthrie-Smith Trust was founded in 1942 after Barbara Absolom, daughter of Herbert Guthrie-Smith, donated 800 hectares of land to it to administer for the benefit of the people of New Zealand educational and recreational purposes. The remaining 90 hectares now includes a 20,000 tree arboretum, which opened to the public in 2013, and an education centre.

== See also ==
- Conservation in New Zealand
- Lake Tūtira
