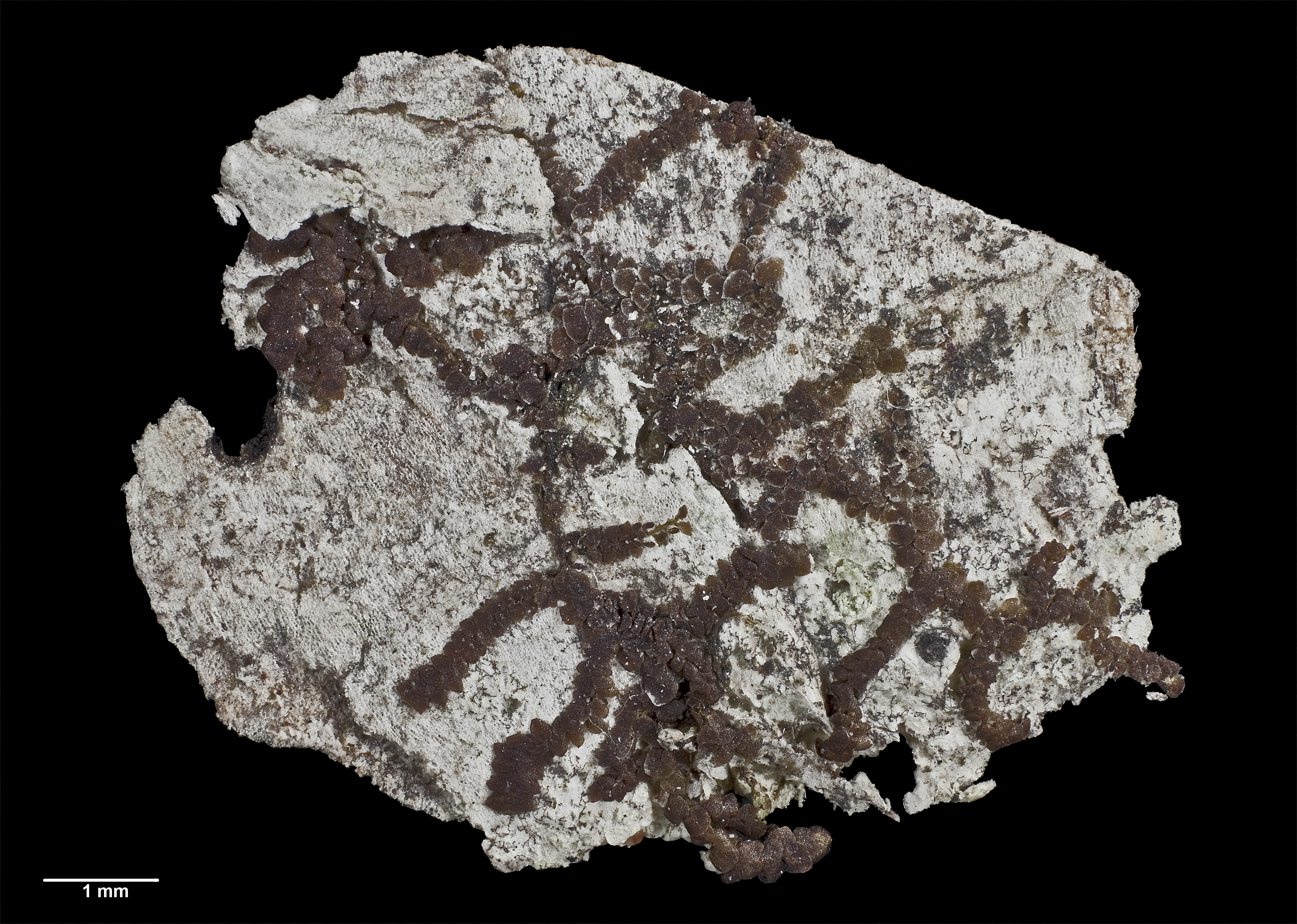

Conservation status
- Nationally Critical (NZ TCS)

Scientific classification
- Kingdom: Plantae
- Division: Marchantiophyta
- Class: Jungermanniopsida
- Order: Frullaniales
- Family: Frullaniaceae
- Genus: Frullania
- Species: F. wairua

Binomial name
- Frullania wairua von Konrat & Braggins

= Frullania wairua =

Species of liverwort

Frullania wairua, commonly known as the spirit liverwort or Radar Bush liverwort, is a species of liverwort in the order Porellales. It is one of 24 species in the large genus Frullania that are native to New Zealand. The species was first described by Matt von Konrat and John E. Braggins in 2005 in the New Zealand Journal of Botany.

== Etymology ==
The specific epithet wairua is a Māori word that means "spirit". The name refers to the habitat of the species, which is near the tip of Cape Reinga. In Māori traditions, spirits travel to a pōhutukawa tree (Metrosideros excelsa) at the end of Cape Reinga after death, and then descend into the water to reunite with their ancestors.

== Description ==
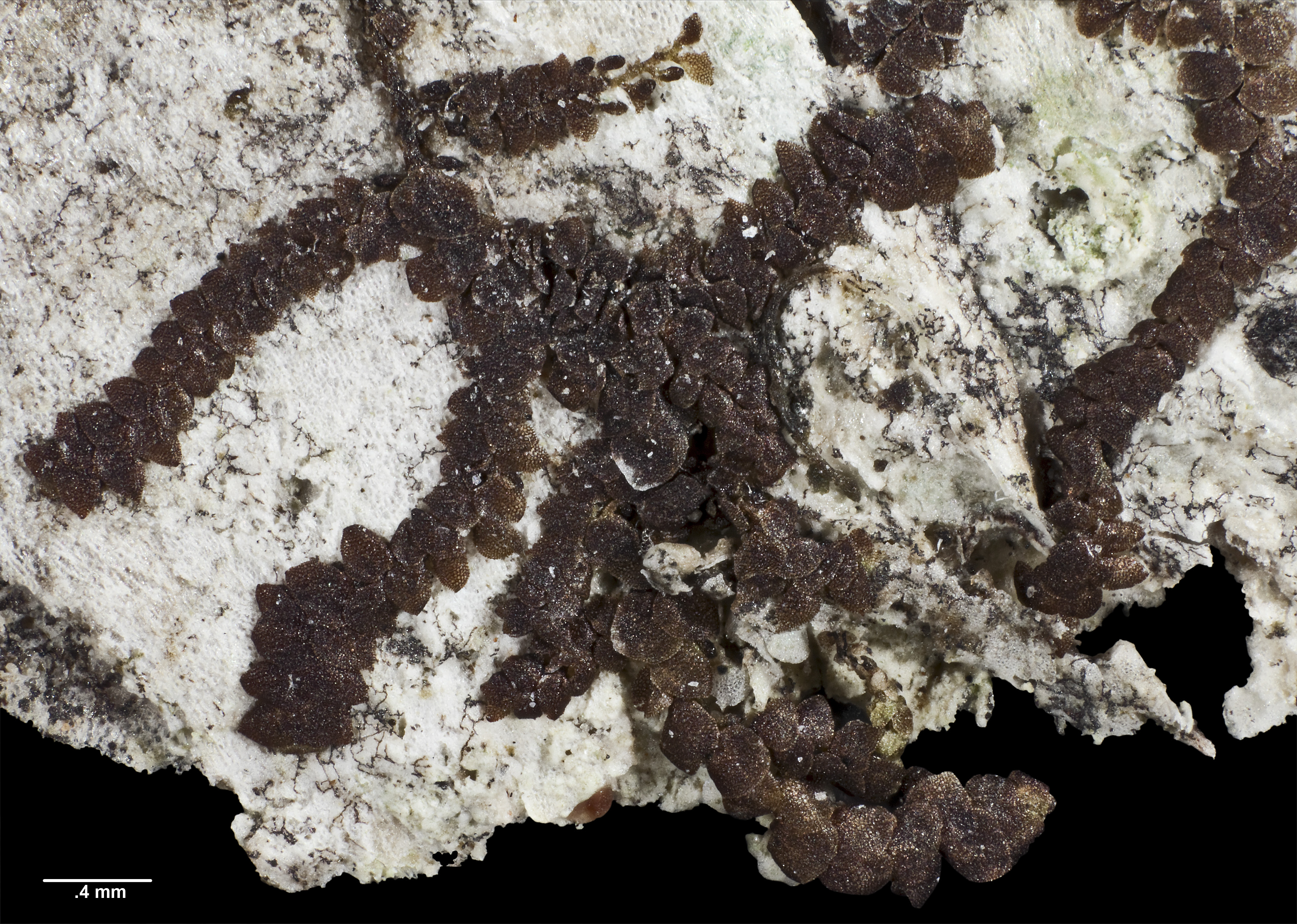
Detail of the holotype of Frullania wairua

The spirit liverwort is a small plant, with central shoots only 750 micrometres (μm) wide. It is olive-green in colour, and smaller shoots branch out in pairs from the sides of the main shoots.

The first branches have an underleaf that is divided into three segments, while the leaf is divided in half into two segments. The stem leaves on the main shoot are a flat oval shape (when either wet or dry) and slightly overlap. They measure 300 μm long and 225 μm, with flat edges and ends that can be rounded or pointy. Their base is either flat or somewhat round, and their topside surface is flat. Under each main leaf is a small lobule that is attached to the stem by only a few cells. They spread out diagonally at an angle of 30–50 degrees, tilting outwards from the stem. The lobules have a blunt end and measure 125 μm long and 80 μm wide.

On all collected specimens of Frullania wairua, the only reproductive structures observed were female gynoecia. As such, the species is believed to be dioicous, with male and female structures occurring on separate plants. Each gynoecium is on the end of a leading stem and carries one flower-like structure, with a series of bracts and one or two branches surrounding it. The innermost bract has two lobes of uneven size, and every bract lobe has several rough serrations along its edge. Each gynoecium has three archegonia which carry the egg cells. About half of the perianth sticks out from the surrounding structures, and it is a stretched oval shape with a somewhat triangular cross-section.

== Ecology ==
Frullania wairua grows on canopy twigs of the Bartlett's rātā tree. It has been found on just four individual trees, and is entirely absent from related trees like rātā, pōhutukawa, mamangi, and maire tawake. Because of its rarity, and because the tree it grows on is rapidly declining in population, Frullania wairua is at risk of becoming extinct. It has been classified as Nationally Critical in New Zealand.
