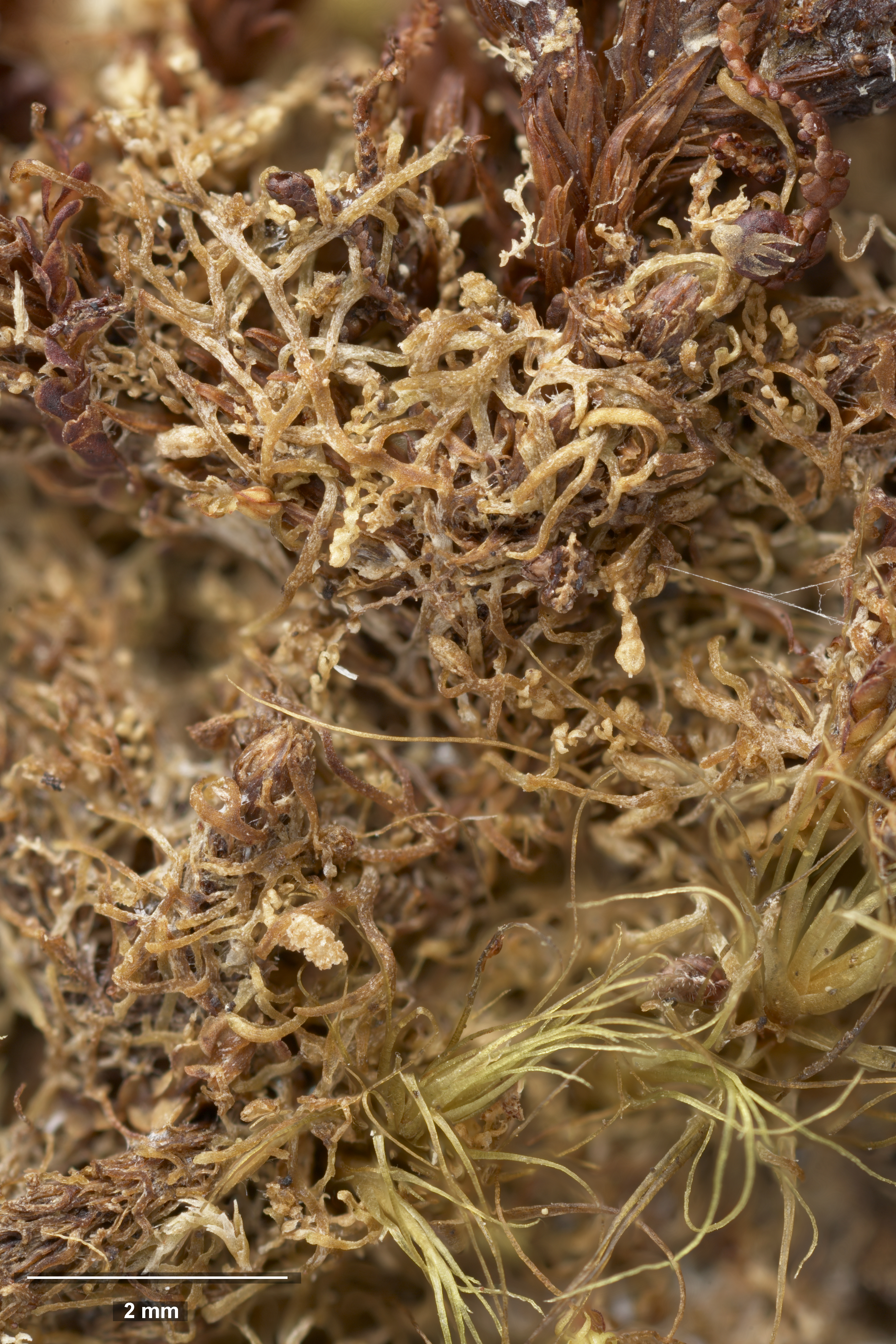
- Type specimen from the collections of Te Papa

Scientific classification
- Kingdom: Plantae
- Division: Marchantiophyta
- Class: Jungermanniopsida
- Order: Metzgeriales
- Family: Aneuraceae
- Genus: Riccardia
- Species: R. furtiva

Binomial name
- Riccardia furtiva E.A.Br. & Braggins

= Riccardia furtiva =

Species of liverwort

Riccardia furtiva is a species of liverwort in the family Aneuraceae. The species was first identified by Elizabeth Brown and John E. Braggins in 1989. R. furtiva is found in Australia and New Zealand, and is an epiphyte, growing on the base of other bryophyte species in shaded peaty areas.

== Etymology ==
The specific epithet furtiva refers to how the species is often hidden among other bryophytes and easy to overlook.

== Description ==
Riccardia furtiva is a small, filamentous and clear green liverwort.

== Distribution and habitat ==
Riccardia furtiva is found in Australia and New Zealand. The species appears to be widespread but rare, and is a rare example of a bryophyte epiphyte; often growing at the base of other bryophytes. The species is often found in damp, shaded, peaty areas.
