= Mary Dobie =

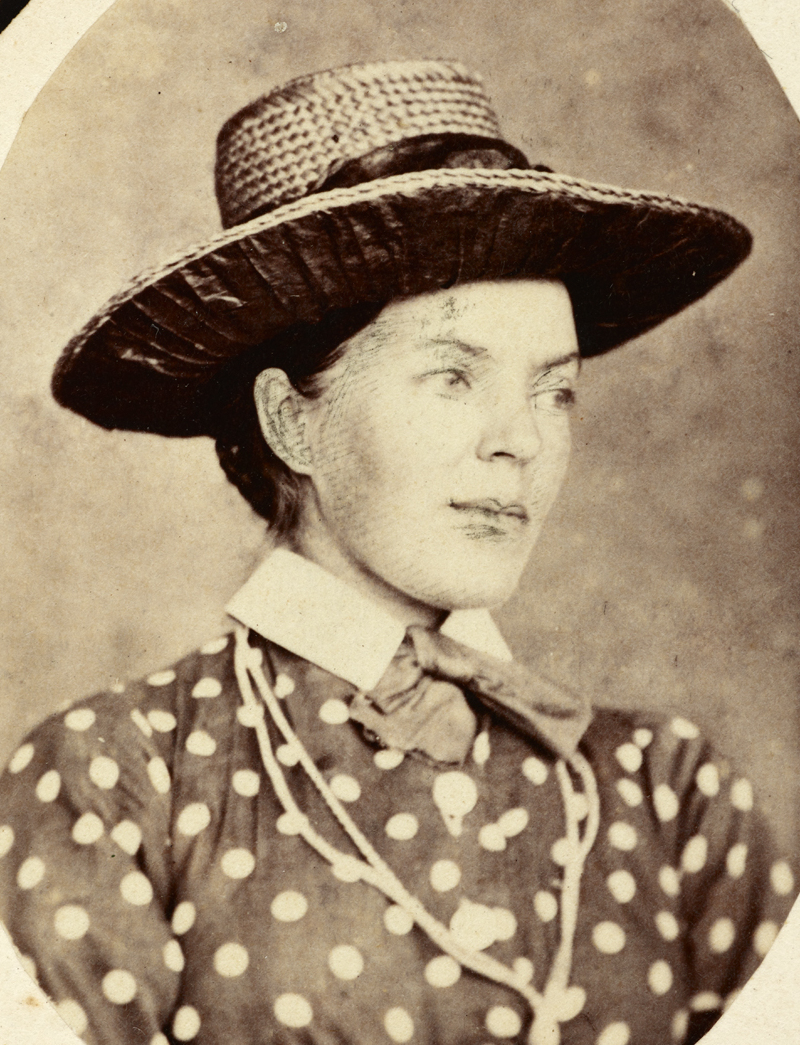
- Dobie in 1879
- Born: 22 December 1850
- Died: 25 November 1880 (aged 29); Ōpunake, New Zealand
- Occupation: Artist
- Employer: The Graphic
- Relatives: Herbert Boucher Dobbie (brother)

Mary Beatrix Dobie (22 December 1850 – 25 November 1880) was an English painter who died in New Zealand.

== Biography ==
Dobie spent some of her early years in Burma, where her father Herbert Main Dobie was a major in the British army. He died there in 1854 when Dobie was three years old, and his widow Ellen Dobie travelled back to England with Dobie and her siblings. Ellen settled in Irthington, Cumbria to raise her family of three daughters and three sons. When she was 21 years old, Dobie moved to London and enrolled in the Female School of Art in Bloomsbury.

In 1875, Dobie's older brother Herbert emigrated to New Zealand, and in 1877, Dobie and her mother and sister Bertha travelled first-class on the May Queen to visit him, arriving in January 1878. Dobie and Bertha kept detailed diaries of the journey and Dobie made sketches and drawings, which were later edited and published as The Voyage of the May Queen. Herbert had purchased a cottage in Parnell, Auckland, and the three visitors stayed with him there while also enjoying trips to attractions such as the famed Pink and White Terraces. In 1879 Dobie and her sister travelled to Samoa and Fiji for more sightseeing.

During this time, Dobie sketched and painted scenes depicting her travels, some of which were published in the London Graphic magazine. She also worked on the illustrations for Herbert's book New Zealand Ferns, which, on publication, became the standard book on the subject and was re-printed five times.

In November 1880 Dobie visited her sister in her new home in Ōpunake, Taranaki; Bertha had married a constabulary officer who had been transferred to the fortified town due to tensions and fighting between the local Māori people and the British settlers. Dobie and Bertha explored the area together, including a visit to the nearby village of Parihaka, where Dobie sketched the village and its leader Te Whiti o Rongomai.

When she was out sketching one afternoon at Te Namu Bay she was confronted by a man, Tuhiata, who demanded money from her. Dobie gave him what she had, but when she said she would report Tuhiata to the British authorities, he attacked her and killed her. Her body was found around 9.30p.m. that evening by her brother-in-law and a search party of fellow constabulary.

Tuhiata confessed to the crime and was tried and found guilty. He was sentenced to death by hanging, which was carried out on 29 December in Wellington.
