= Chemical and Pharmaceutical Bulletin =

- Discipline: Pharmaceutical science; Health sciences
- Language: English
- Edited by: Yoshiji Takemoto

Publication details
- Former name(s): Pharmaceutical Bulletin (1953–1957); Chemical & Pharmaceutical Bulletin (1958–2011)
- History: 1953-present
- Publisher: Pharmaceutical Society of Japan (Japan)
- Frequency: Monthly

Standard abbreviations
- ISO 4: Chem. Pharm. Bull.

Indexing
- ISSN: 0009-2363 (print); 1347-5223 (web)

Links
- Journal homepage

Chemical and Pharmaceutical Bulletin is a monthly peer-reviewed medical journal published by the Pharmaceutical Society of Japan. The journal was established in 1953 as the Pharmaceutical Bulletin. From 1958 to 2011 it was known as the Chemical & Pharmaceutical Bulletin, and as Chemical and Pharmaceutical Bulletin from 2012 onward. In 2012, the society re-organized its journals, and most material published in the Journal of Health Science now started to be published in the sister publication Biological and Pharmaceutical Bulletin and with some being published in Chemical and Pharmaceutical Bulletin. The editor in chief is Yoshiji Takemoto (Kyoto University).

== Abstracting and indexing ==
Chemical and Pharmaceutical Bulletin is abstracted and indexed in the following databases:

- Aquatic Sciences & Fisheries Abstracts
- Biosis
- Biotechnology Research Abstracts
- Chemical Abstracts Core
- Chimica
- International Pharmaceutical Abstracts
- MEDLINE
- Science Citation Index Expanded
- Scopus
- Veterinary Science Database
