= Herbert Boucher Dobbie =

- Born: Hayes
- Died: Auckland
- Occupation: Botanical collector, scientific collector
- Children: Beatrix Dobie
- Relatives: Mary Dobie

Herbert Boucher Dobbie (13 February 1852–8 August 1940) was a New Zealand engineering draughtsman, botanist, stationmaster, orchardist and writer.

== Biography ==
Dobbie was born in Hayes, Middlesex, England, on 13 February 1852. He was one of six children to Herbert Main Dobbie and Ellen Locker. His father, a major in the 30th Madras Infantry, took the family to India and Burma and it was there that the family name changed from Dobie - the Hindu word for laundryman. When his father died of fever, his mother returned to England with the family. In England, Dobbie attended Pilherds, a boarding school near Maidenhead. After leaving school, he trained as an engineer in Edinburgh, working on both ships and locomotives.

In 1875, he emigrated to New Zealand in on the Lutterworth and joined the government railways department in Auckland, working as a fitter. Dobbie was an engineer by profession and went on to work as a draughtsman, stationmaster and manager in locations around the country. By 1880, Dobbie was living in Parnell with his wife Charlotte Gilfillan.

His mother and two of his sisters, Bertha and Mary, visited on an extended holiday, intending to return to England. However, Bertha met and married Forster Goring, a Clerk of the Executive Council and a colonial militia who was transferred to Taranaki in 1880. Before visiting Bertha in Taranaki, his sister Mary assisted Dobbie to prepare his first book, 145 varieties of New Zealand ferns (1880), which coincided with an exhibition of his collection of ferns at the Auckland Institute and Museum, then located in Symonds Street.

Dobbie worked for a brief period on railways in Africa and eventually returned to Auckland where he built 'Ruatoria', a house which is now the site of St Cuthberts, at 122 Market Road in Epsom, where he constructed a fernery. He wrote New Zealand Ferns in 1921, a much expanded volume of his first volume of ferns.

Dobbie died in 1940 aged 88 and was survived by his wife Charlotte and six of his seven children.

== Works ==
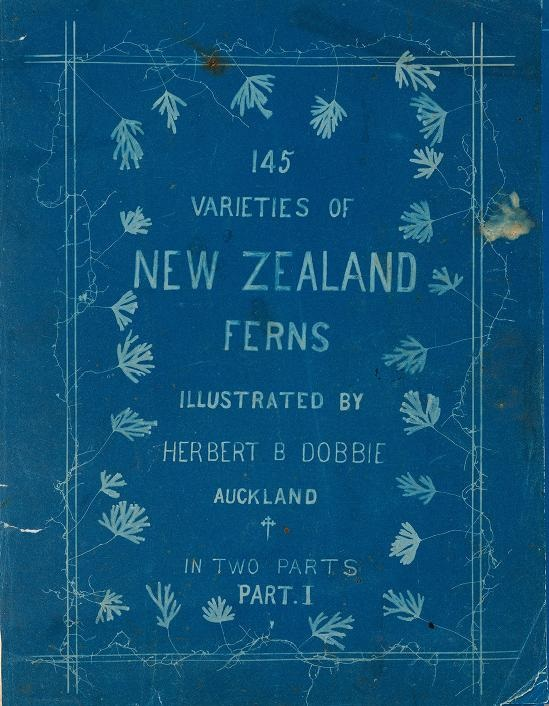
Title page of 145 Varieties of New Zealand Ferns (1880)

=== Editions and versions of New Zealand ferns ===
- New Zealand ferns (1880), 1st edition (five versions, referred to as the "blue books")
- New Zealand ferns (1921), 2nd edition
- New Zealand ferns (1931), 3rd edition
- New Zealand ferns (1951), 4th edition, revised by Marguerite Crookes
- New Zealand ferns (1952), 5th edition, reprinted, revised by Marguerite Crookes
- New Zealand ferns (1963), 6th edition, rewritten by Marguerite Crookes

==== New Zealand ferns (1880, first edition) ====
Five versions of the first edition of New Zealand ferns were produced by Herbert Dobbie and Eric Craig in the late nineteenth century. These are often referred to as the "blue books" because the pages have full-sized, white silhouettes of ferns on a blue background. The five versions are:

A: Dobbie, H. B. "145 Varieties of New Zealand ferns" In two parts. Part 1. (1880) pp. 1–48.

B: Dobbie, H. B. "New Zealand ferns. 148 Varieties." In two parts. Part 2, (1880) pp. 49–104.

C: Dobbie, H. B. "New Zealand ferns. 148 Varieties." (1880) 104p.

D: Craig, E. "New Zealand ferns, 167 Varieties." (c. 1888) 104p.

E: Craig, E. "New Zealand ferns, 172 Varieties." Ed 2. (1892) 100p.

They were made by a process similar to blueprinting. A fern specimen was placed on chemically treated paper, which was then exposed to light for a set period of time. The paper was then washed in water which caused the exposed paper to turn blue while the paper under the fern remained white. However, the leaf venation (vein arrangement) would not show up using this process.

Herbert B. Dobbie produced three hand-made book versions of fern illustrations (versions A-C). A few years later Dobbie sold the plates for this book to Eric Craig in Auckland who re-issued the books in c. 1888 and c.1892 (D-E).

Only 14 copies are known to survive. The images in the blue books were not as detailed as other nature printing processes. however, they were reported in the New Zealand Herald described them as handsome volumes.

There are very few fern specimens collected or identified by Dobbie in New Zealand's herbarium collections. Dobbie's books, and particularly their images, are therefore the principal means of authenticating the identifications and names that he, as the New Zealand expert of that period, used for New Zealand ferns. The blue books are an important early window into Dobbie's understanding and interpretation of New Zealand fern taxonomy and diversity. They are also striking representations of New Zealand's ferns.

==== New Zealand ferns (1921, second and later editions) ====
Dobbie went on to produce the second and later editions of New Zealand ferns from 1921 onwards. With its fine photographs of fern specimens, hints on collection and cultivation and delightful essays on fern-collecting expeditions it was an entirely different book from that of 1880. Unfortunately, in his effort to cater to the general reader Dobbie deliberately used popular but inaccurate terminology in his fern descriptions. This was remedied in the fourth edition of 1951, revised by Marguerite Crookes. She then rewrote the book for the final edition of 1963, 'incorporating illustrations and original work by H. B. Dobbie'. For 70 years, in one or other of its editions, it was the most popular book on New Zealand ferns.
