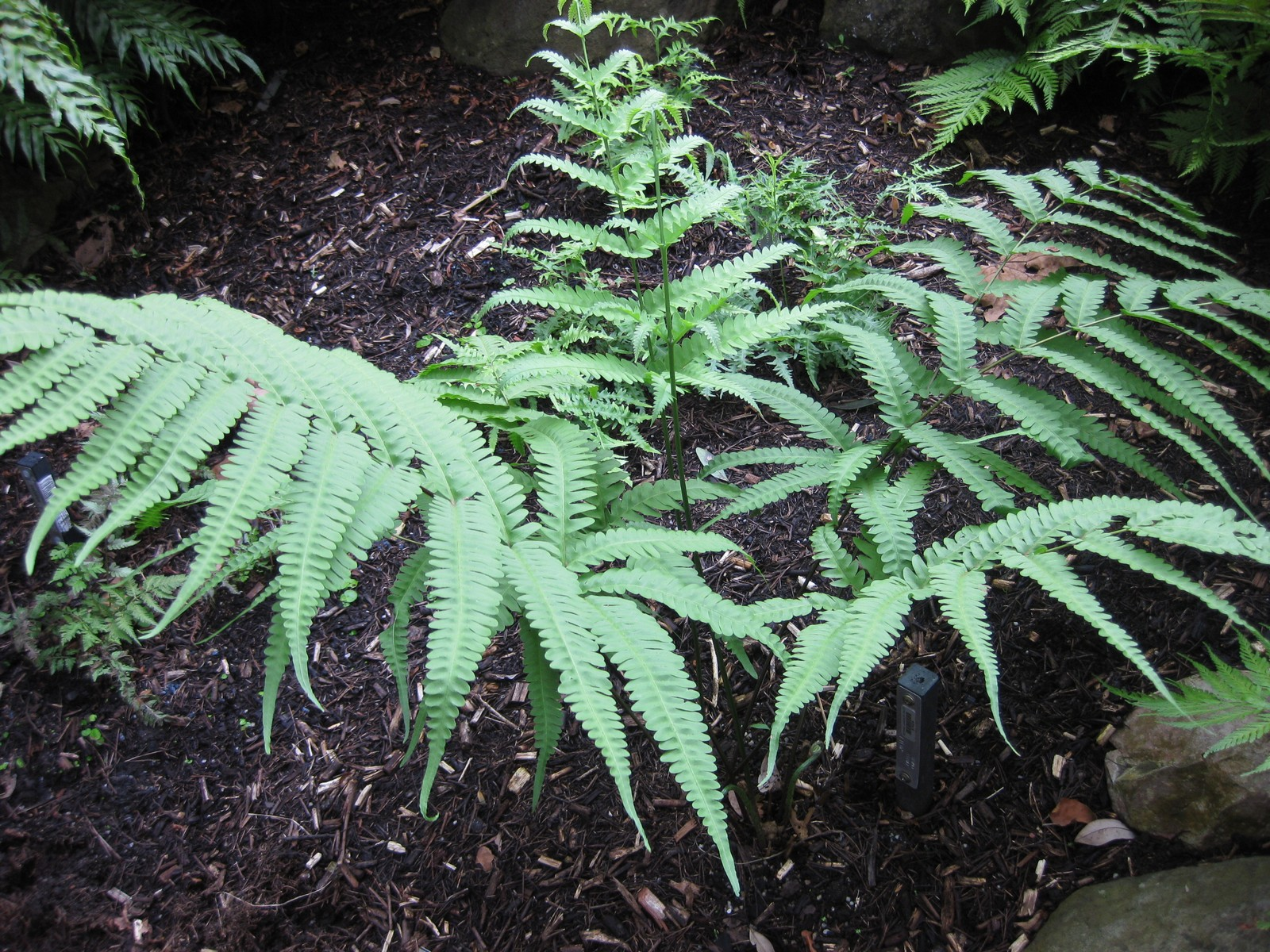
- Royal Botanic Gardens, Sydney, Australia

Scientific classification
- Kingdom: Plantae
- Clade: Tracheophytes
- Division: Polypodiophyta
- Class: Polypodiopsida
- Order: Polypodiales
- Family: Pteridaceae
- Genus: Pteris
- Species: P. comans

Binomial name
- Pteris comans G.Forst.

= Pteris comans =

Netted brake

Species of fern

Pteris comans is a fern from eastern Australia and New Zealand. The habitat of the hairy bracken or netted brake is rainforest or moist open forest. The botanist Johann Georg Adam Forster published this plant in Halle, the year 1786, in his Florulae Insularum Australium Prodromus. The specific epithet comans is derived from Latin, meaning "covered with hair".
