= Alison Stewart (biologist) =

New Zealand plant pathologist

Dame Alison Stewart DNZM FRSNZ
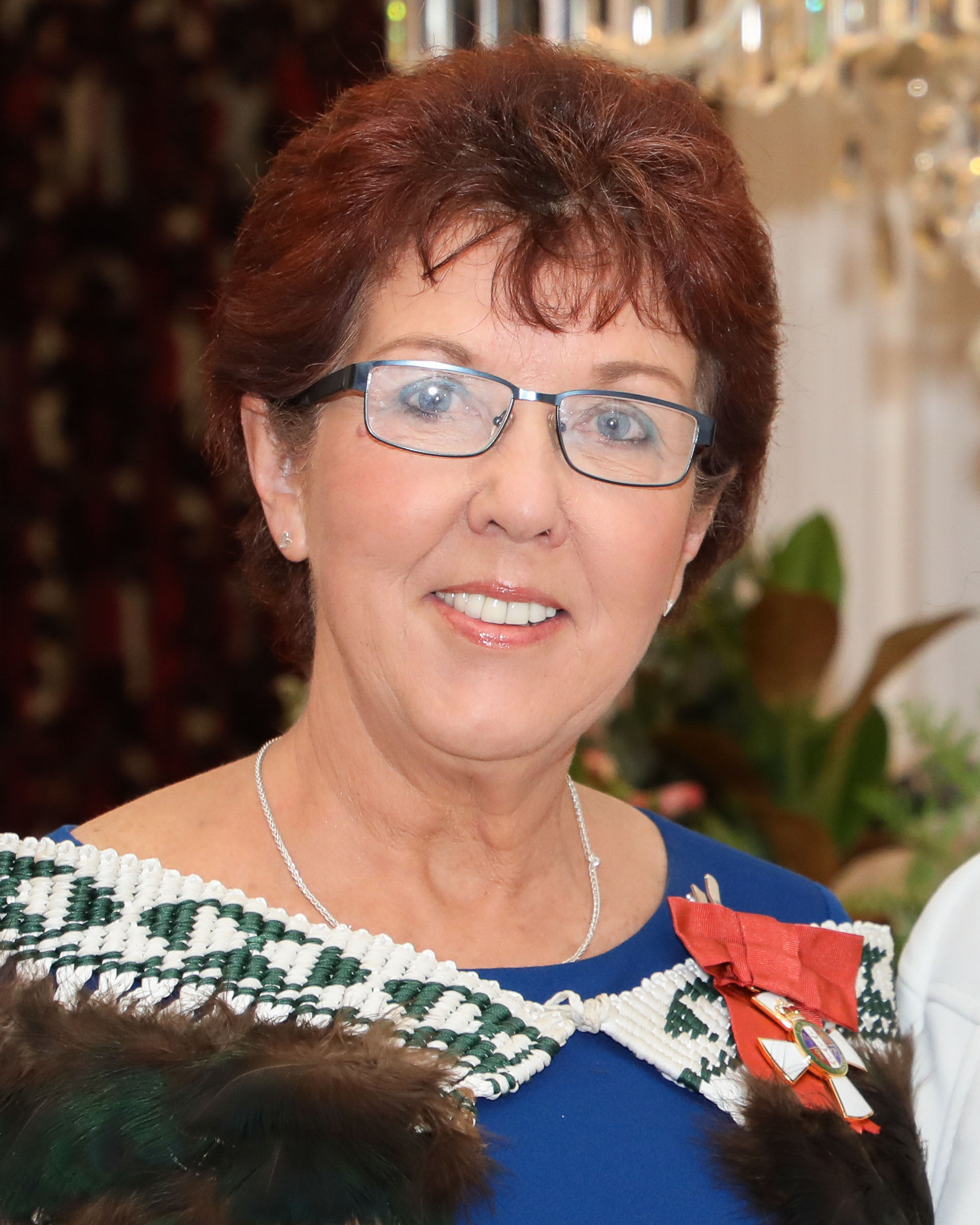
- Stewart in 2025
- Born: 1957 (age 68–69); Scotland

Academic background
- Education: University of Glasgow
- Alma mater: University of Stirling
- Thesis: Mechanisms of resistance to botrytis in onion (Allium cepa. L) (1983)

Dame Alison Stewart DNZM FRSNZ (born 1957) is a New Zealand biologist who specialises in plant pathology. From 2018- 2025 she was the CEO of the Foundation for Arable Research, based in Christchurch.

== Early life and education ==
Stewart was born in Scotland in 1957. She completed a BSc majoring in botany in 1980 at the University of Glasgow and graduated from the University of Stirling in 1983 with a PhD in plant pathology.

== Career ==
Stewart moved to New Zealand where she became a senior lecturer in biological sciences at the University of Auckland in 1984. She moved to Lincoln University in 1994 and four years later she was the first woman to be promoted to professor at Lincoln University. She was the inaugural director of the Bio-Protection Research Centre, a Centre of Research Excellence.

She was appointed a Companion of the New Zealand Order of Merit in the 2009 Birthday Honours in recognition of her services to biology, in particular plant pathology. Her investiture was held in the ballroom at Lanarch Castle in Dunedin.

In 2011 Stewart was honoured by Lincoln University as the inaugural Distinguished Professor of Plant Pathology. Appointed Emeritus Professor on leaving the university, she joined Marrone Bio Innovations in California in April 2013. She returned to New Zealand as general manager, forest science at Scion, formerly the New Zealand Forest Research Institute. In March 2018 she became the CEO of FAR, the Foundation for Arable Research.

Her research has focused on developing bioprotection technologies and included extensive studies of Trichoderma.

Stewart has served as vice president of the New Zealand Plant Protection Society and the Australasian Plant Pathology Society. She has also been the Australasian councillor for the International Society of Plant Pathologists.

In the 2025 King’s Birthday Honours, Stewart was promoted to Dame Companion of the New Zealand Order of Merit, for services to plant science and the arable sector.

In 2026 Stewart was elected a Fellow of the Royal Society Te Apārangi.

The standard author abbreviation Alison Stewart is used to indicate this person as the author when citing a botanical name.
