= Flora of the Antipodes Islands =

This is a list of taxa comprising the flora of the Antipodes Islands. It includes some species known as megaherbs.

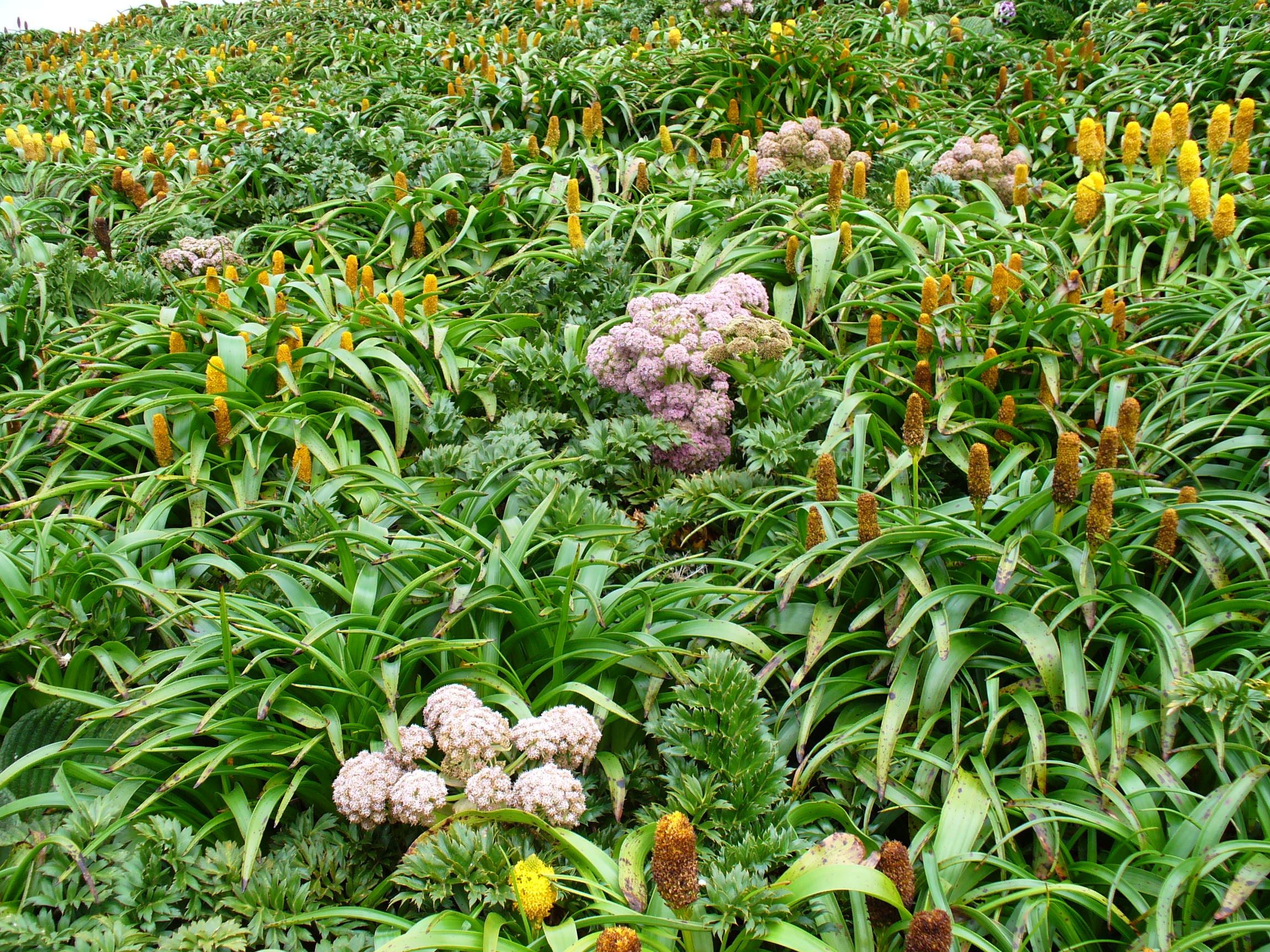
A megaherb community

== Algae ==
In 1985, 116 species of marine algae were recorded at the Antipodes Islands. At least three species of freshwater algae have been recorded, but these have not yet been positively identified: a species of Chlorella, at least one species of Chlamydomonas, and a Xanthophyceae, perhaps Tetrakenton or Goniochloris.

== Fungi ==
The only fungi recorded from the Antipodes Islands are Puccinia caricina and a Claviceps (Ergot) species.

== Lichens ==
The following species of lichen have been recorded from the Antipodes Islands:

- Cladia aggregata
- Cladia retipora
- Cladina confusa
- Cladonia campbelliana
- Cladonia capitellata
- Cladonia cervicornis subsp. verticillata
- Everniastrum sorocheilum
- Menegazzia circumsorediata
- Opegrapha diaphoriza
- Parmelia cunninghamii
- Pseudocyphellaria coronata
- Pseudocyphellaria glabra
- Stereocaulon argus
- Stereocaulon ramulosum
- Usnea torulosa
- Usnea cf. xanthopoga
- Xanthoria ligulata

== Liverworts ==
The following species of liverwort have been recorded from the Antipodes Islands:

- Adelanthus occlusus
- Anastrophyllum schismoides
- Chandonanthus squarrosus
- Chiloscyphus erraticus
- Chiloscyphus furcistipulus
- Chiloscyphus physanthus
- Clasmatocolea paucistipula
- Cuspidatula monodon
- Frullania falciloba
- Frullania scandens
- Gackstroemia weindorferi
- Jamesoniella colorata
- Lejeunea primordialis
- Lepidolaena hodgsoniae
- Lepidolaena taylori
- Lepidozia glaucophylla
- Lophocolea bidentata
- Lophocolea hodgsoniae
- Lophocolea gunniana
- Lophocolea minor
- Lophocolea nova-zelandiae
- Lophocolea semiteres
- Lophocolea sp.
- Marchantia berteroana
- Marsupidium abbreviatum
- Metzgeria decipiens
- Metzgeria disciformis
- Pallavicinia xiphoides
- Plagiochila deltoidea
- Plagiochila radiculosa
- Plagiochila sinclairii
- Plagiochila strombifolia
- Porella elegantula
- Telaranea corticola
- Telaranea patentissima
- Tylimanthus tenellus

== Mosses ==
The following species of moss have been recorded from the Antipodes Islands:

- Breutelia pendula
- Bryum argenteum
- Bryum blandum
- Campylopus clavatus
- Campylopus introflexus
- Ceratodon purpureus
- Dicranoloma robustum
- Drepanocladus fluitans
- Lembophyllum clandestinum
- Leptostomum inclinans
- Muelleriella crassifolia
- Pohlia wahlenbergii
- Polytrichadelphus magellanicus
- Polytrichum juniperinum
- Ptychomnion aciculare
- Racomitrium crispulum
- Rhynchostegium tenuifolium
- Sphagnum australe
- Sphagnum falcatulum
- Tayloria purpurascens
- Willia calobolax

== Lycopods ==
Three species of lycopod have been recorded from the Antipodes Islands:

- Lycopodium fastigiatum
- Lycopodium scariosum
- Lycopodium varium

== Ferns ==
The following species of fern have been recorded from the Antipodes Islands:

- Asplenium obtusatum
- Asplenium terrestre
- Austroblechnum durum
- Blechnum fluviatile
- Blechnum penna-marina
- Blechnum sp.
- Grammitis billartierei
- Grammitis magellanica subsp. magellanica
- Grammitis givenii
- Histiopteris incisa
- Hymenophyllum flabellatum
- Hymenophyllum minimum
- Hymenophyllum multifidum
- Hypolepis millefolium
- Phymatosorus diversifolius
- Polystichum vestitum
- Pteridium esculentum

== Flowering plants ==
=== Monocotyledons ===
The following species of monocotyledon have been recorded from the Antipodes Islands:

- Aporostylis bifolia
- Carex appressa
- Carex sectoides
- Carex ternaria
- Carex trifida
- Chiloglottis cornuta
- Corybas trilobis
- Isolepis aucklandica
- Isolepis cernua
- Juncus scheuchzerioides
- Lachnogrostis leptostachys
- Luzula crinita var. crinita
- Poa annua
- Poa antipoda
- Poa breviglumis
- Poa foliosa
- Poa litorosa
- Polypogon magellanicus
- Prasophyllum colensoi
- Puccinellia antipoda
- Uncinia hookeri

=== Dicotyledons ===
The following species of dicotyledon have been recorded from the Antipodes Islands:

- Anisotome antipoda
- Apium prostratum
- Stilbocarpa polaris
- Helichrysum bellidioides
- Lagenifera petiolata
- Leptinella plumosa
- Pleurophyllum criniferum
- Pseudognaphalium luteoalbum
- Senecio radiolatus
- Sonchus asper
- Taraxacum magellanicum
- Cardamine corymbosa
- Lepidium oleraceum
- Callitriche antarctica
- Colobanthus apetalus
- Colobanthus muscoides
- Stellaria decipiens var. decipiens
- Stellaria decipiens var. angustata
- Stellaria media
- Crassula moschata
- Gentiana antipoda
- Geranium microphyllum
- Pratia arenaria
- Epilobium alsinoides subsp. atriplicifolium
- Epilobium pedunculare
- Rumex neglectus
- Montia fontana
- Acaena minor var. antarctica
- Coprosma ciliata
- Coprosma perpusilla subsp. subantarctica
- Coprosma rugosa
- Coprosma rugosa x ciliata
- Urtica australis
