= Leptoscyphus azoricus =

Conservation status
- Least Concern (IUCN 2.3)

Scientific classification
- Kingdom: Plantae
- Division: Marchantiophyta
- Class: Jungermanniopsida
- Order: Lepidoziales
- Family: Lophocoleaceae
- Genus: Leptoscyphus
- Species: L. azoricus

Binomial name
- Leptoscyphus azoricus (Buch & Perss.) Grolle

Species of liverwort

Leptoscyphus azoricus is a species of liverwort in the family Lophocoleaceae. It is endemic to Portugal.
