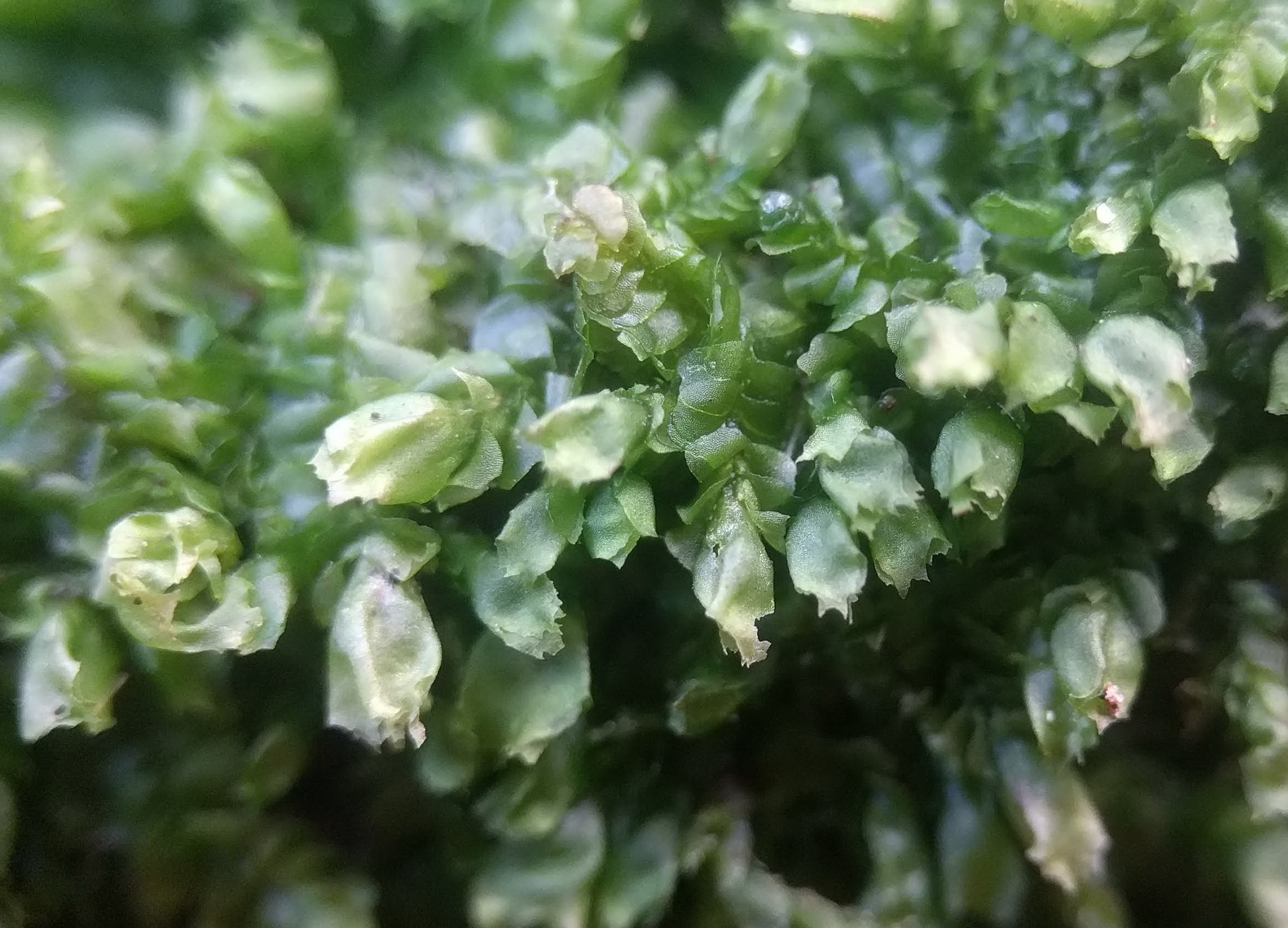

Scientific classification
- Kingdom: Plantae
- Division: Marchantiophyta
- Class: Jungermanniopsida
- Order: Lepidoziales
- Family: Lophocoleaceae
- Genus: Lophocolea
- Species: L. heterophylla

Binomial name
- Lophocolea heterophylla (Schrad.) Dumort.

= Lophocolea heterophylla =

Species of liverwort

Lophocolea heterophylla, the variable-leaved crestwort, is a liverwort species belonging to the order Jungermanniales, which is the largest liverwort order.

== Description ==
The variable-leaved crestwort has pale green translucent leaves, which are bilobed at the bottom of the stem but become notched or completely smooth (no notches and not bilobed) further up the stem. Shoots can be up to 3mm wide with the leaves being no more than 1.5mm in width and length. The plant has a strong scent.

=== Reproductive organs ===
In the British Isles, it is often encountered in a fertile state. Structures for asexual reproduction (gemmae) are also sometimes present on the edges of the leaves and bracts.

== British distribution ==
The variable-leaved crestwort is most frequent in the south of Britain, especially England, although it can be found as far north as Inverness. It can also be found in the Isle of Man and in some parts of the Republic of Ireland.

== Habitat ==
Mostly on the base of trees, but also fallen wood, soil, leaf litter and roots. It can be found in most types of woodland, but ancient woodland is a key habitat in the west and north.

== Similar species in Britain ==
While the leaves of L. heterophylla are distinctly bilobed at the base of the stem, all leaves of Lophocolea bidentata are bilobed, and the leaves of Lophocolea semiteres are not bilobed. Lophocolea fragrans has leaves which appear more toothed than lobed.
