= Clasmatocolea fasciculata =

Scientific classification
- Kingdom: Plantae
- Division: Marchantiophyta
- Class: Jungermanniopsida
- Order: Lepidoziales
- Family: Lophocoleaceae
- Genus: Clasmatocolea
- Species: C. fasciculata

Binomial name
- Clasmatocolea fasciculata (Nees) Grolle

Species of liverwort

Clasmatocolea fasciculata is a species of liverwort belonging to the family Lophocoleaceae. It is known from South Africa where it grows on woody debris.
