= Pachyglossa =

Pachyglossa may refer to:

== Plants and animals ==
- Pachyglossa (bird), one of three genera of flowerpeckers
- Pachyglossa (plant), a genus of liverworts
