= Clasmatocolea rigens =

Scientific classification
- Kingdom: Plantae
- Division: Marchantiophyta
- Class: Jungermanniopsida
- Order: Lepidoziales
- Family: Lophocoleaceae
- Genus: Clasmatocolea
- Species: C. rigens

Binomial name
- Clasmatocolea rigens (Hook.f. & Taylor) J.J.Engel

Synonyms
- Jungermannia rigens Hook.f. & Taylor; Lophocolea bidentata var. kerguelensis Schiffn., 1890

Species of liverwort

Clasmatocolea rigens is a species of liverwort belonging to the family Lophocoleaceae. It is among the most common liverwort species of Kerguelen Island, Crozet Archipelago and Prince Edward Islands but is also found in other subantarctic islands and in South-America.
