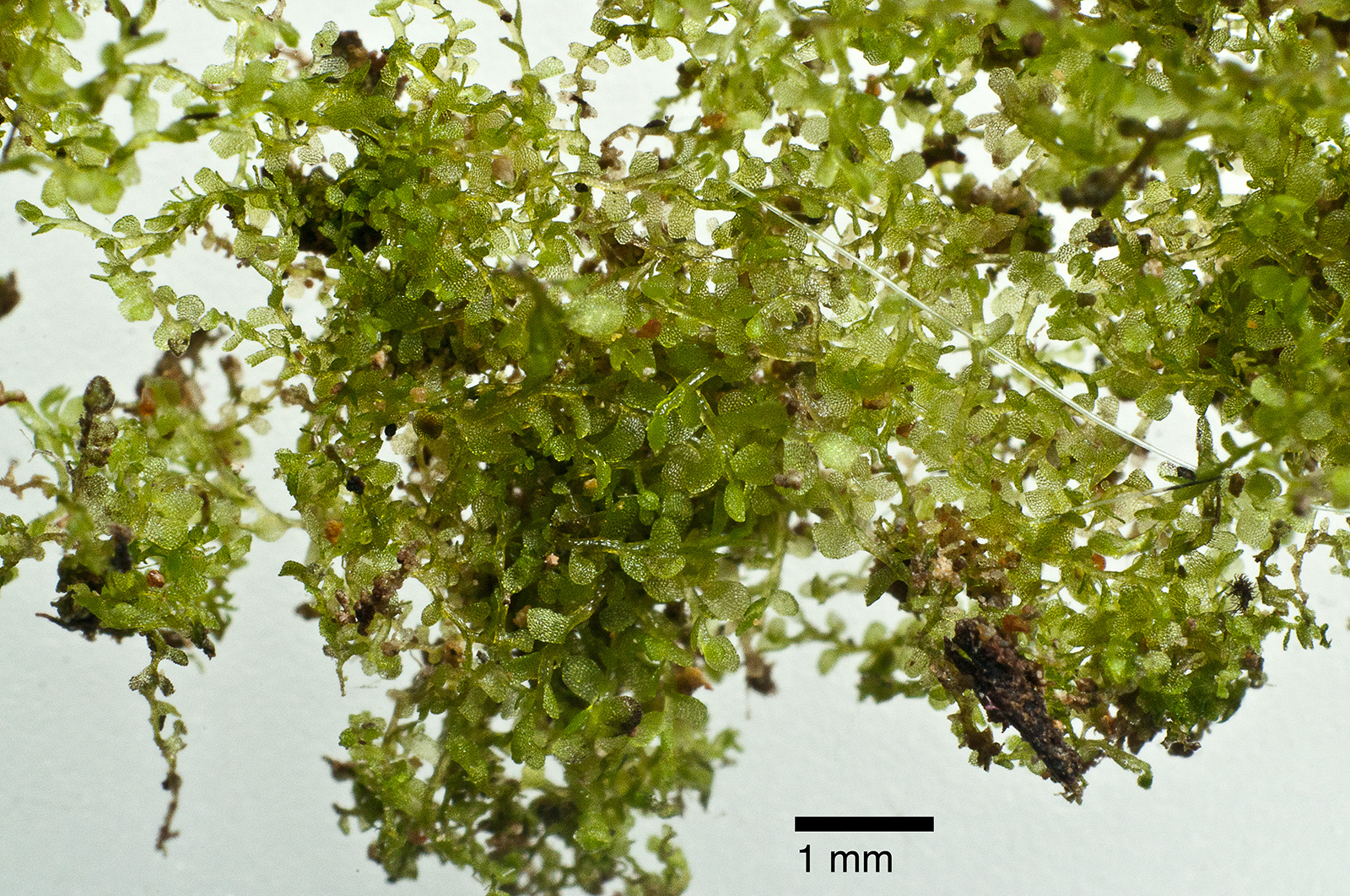

Scientific classification
- Kingdom: Plantae
- Division: Marchantiophyta
- Class: Jungermanniopsida
- Order: Lepidoziales
- Family: Lophocoleaceae
- Genus: Clasmatocolea
- Species: C. vermicularis

Binomial name
- Clasmatocolea vermicularis (Lehm.) Grolle

= Clasmatocolea vermicularis =

Species of liverwort

Clasmatocolea vermicularis is a species of liverwort belonging to the family Lophocoleaceae.

A study in tropical Ecuador found that Clasmatocolea vermicularis was typically not found in urban environments despite being found in a nearby pristine location, suggesting that the species is sensitive to anthropogenic effects such as the presence of wastewater and heavy metal pollution.
