= L. bidentata =

L. bidentata may refer to:

- Leucophytia bidentata, a land snail
- Libnotes bidentata, a crane fly
- Lophocolea bidentata, a liverwort found in the Antipodes Islands
