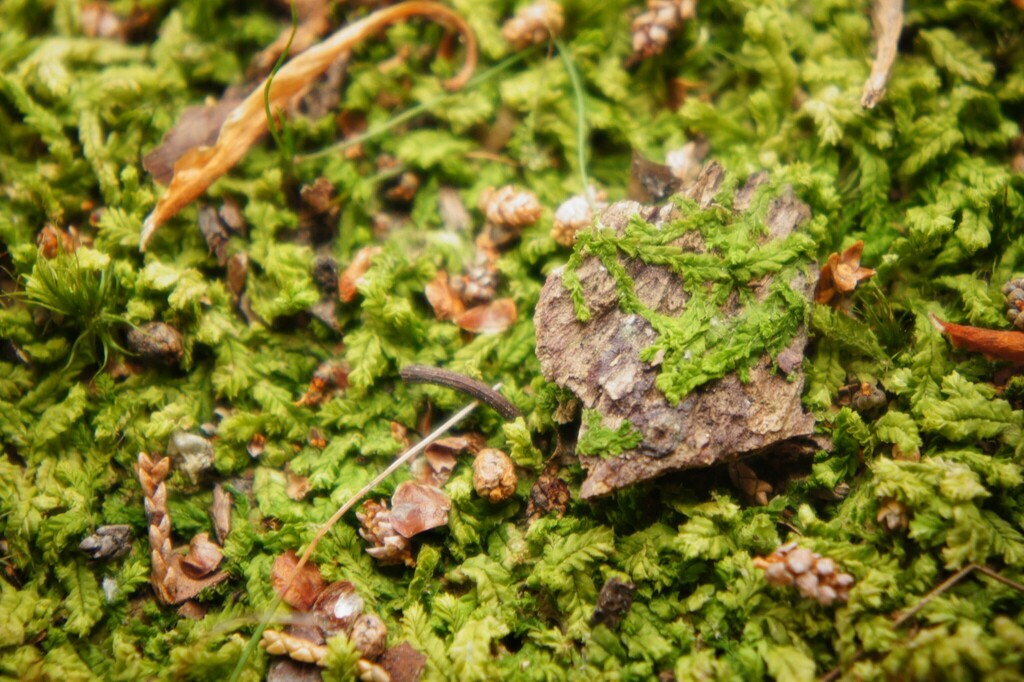

Scientific classification
- Kingdom: Plantae
- Division: Marchantiophyta
- Class: Jungermanniopsida
- Order: Lepidoziales
- Family: Lophocoleaceae
- Genus: Lophocolea
- Species: L. brookwoodiana

Binomial name
- Lophocolea brookwoodiana Paton & Sheahan, 2006

= Lophocolea brookwoodiana =

Species of liverwort

Lophocolea brookwoodiana, the Brookwood crestwort, is a species of liverwort in the family Lophocoleaceae. It is only known from a very small area within Brookwood Cemetery in Surrey, UK.

== Description ==
Lophocolea brookwoodiana is a delicate, translucent, pale green leafy liverwort. Its leaf shape is variable: some leaves have several teeth, whilst others have 2 or 3 blunt lobes. The underleaves are deeply bilobed and have numerous teeth. Unlike other British Lophocolea species, it is not scented.

== Taxonomy ==
The species was described as a new species by Jean A. Paton and Marie Clare Sheahan in 2006. Despite attempts to match it to known Southern Hemisphere species, no such match could be made, suggesting L. brookwoodiana was a species new to science. Despite being Surrey's only endemic species, it is considered likely to be introduced to the location where it was found. Due to its limited distribution it is nationally rare in the United Kingdom.

== Distribution and habitat ==
Lophocolea brookwoodiana has never been found in its presumed native range, where habitat requirements may be different to in the UK. The habitat at Brookwood Cemetery is remnant lowland heath.
