= Pachyglossa tenacifolia =

Scientific classification
- Kingdom: Plantae
- Division: Marchantiophyta
- Class: Jungermanniopsida
- Order: Lepidoziales
- Family: Lophocoleaceae
- Genus: Pachyglossa
- Species: P. tenacifolia

Binomial name
- Pachyglossa tenacifolia (Hook.f. & Taylor) Herzog & Grolle

Species of liverwort

Pachyglossa tenacifolia is a species of liverwort from New Zealand in the family Lophocoleaceae.

== Description ==
A medium-sized plant, shoots approximately 1 mm wide and up to 11 cm long, Pachyglossa tenacifolia branches frequently and is dark-coloured (deep green to black). Unusually for leafy liverworts in the family, P. tenacifolia lateral leaves are similarly sized to the underleaves. Most branches develop laterally- and ventrally-intercalary and plants possess 'stolons', or microphyllous branches. This species is easily distinguished from other liverworts, even in the field, as the leaves are uniquely thick and fleshy with two layers of cells and leaves and underleaves are near identically sized.

== Distribution and habitat ==
Pachyglossa tenacifolia is endemic to New Zealand and can be found on Campbell Island, the Auckland Islands, Stewart Island, and western parts of the South Island. This species occurs mostly in the pen-alpine zone and above on the New Zealand mainland, but sometimes grows near sea level on Stewart Island.
