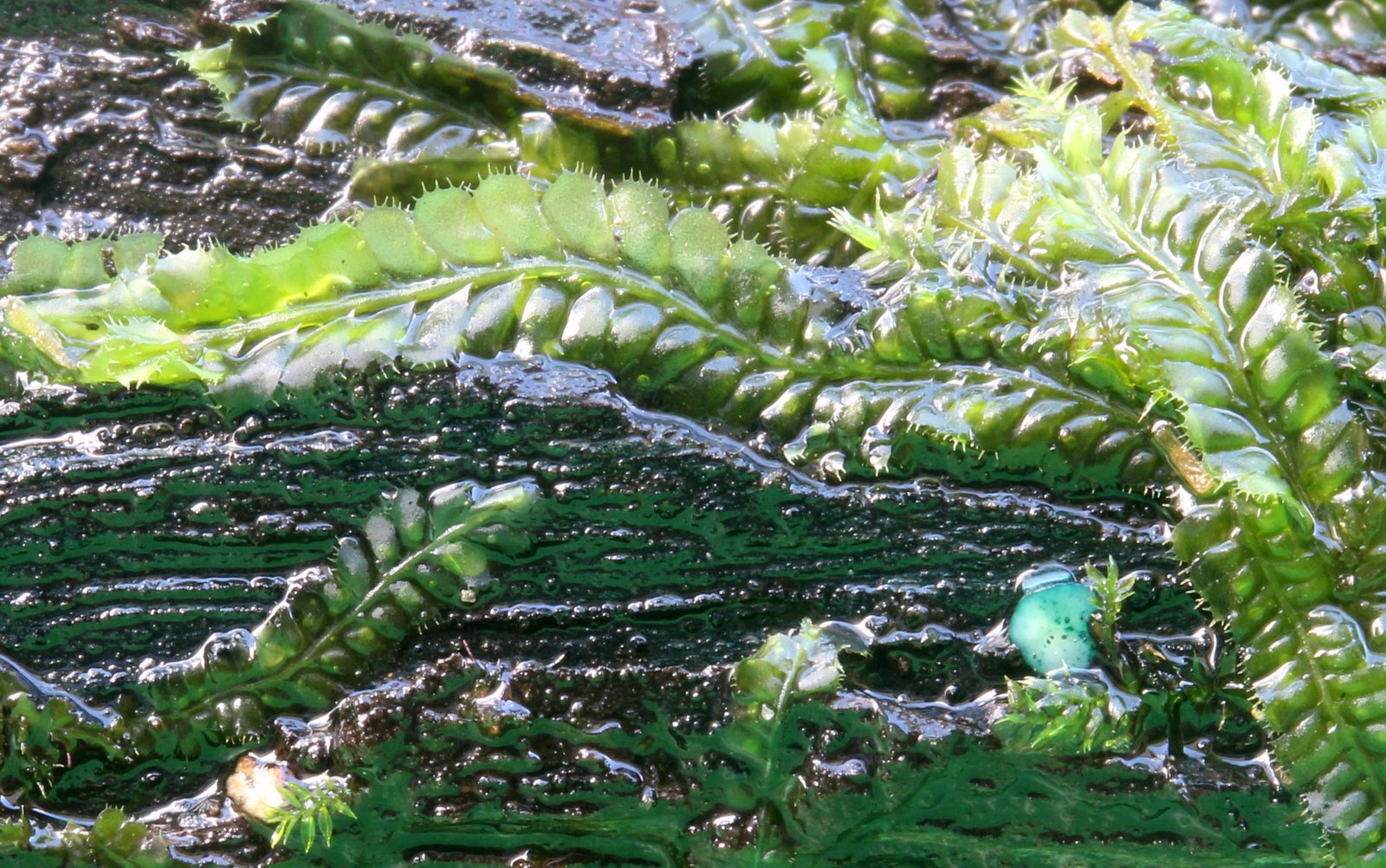

Scientific classification
- Kingdom: Plantae
- Division: Marchantiophyta
- Class: Jungermanniopsida
- Order: Lepidoziales
- Family: Lophocoleaceae
- Genus: Heteroscyphus; Schiffn.

Synonyms
- Amphilophocolea R.M.Schust.; Cyanolophocolea R.M.Schust.

= Heteroscyphus =

Genus of liverworts

Heteroscyphus is a genus of liverworts in the family Lophocoleaceae. 87 species was accepted in this worldwide group in 2019.

== Species ==
As accepted by GBIF;

- Heteroscyphus acutangulus (Schiffn.) Schiffn.
- Heteroscyphus affinis (Gottsche) J.J.Engel & R.M.Schust.
- Heteroscyphus allodontus (Hook.f. & Taylor) J.J.Engel & R.M.Schust.
- Heteroscyphus amboinensis (Schiffn.) Schiffn.
- Heteroscyphus ammophilus (Colenso) R.M.Schust.
- Heteroscyphus argutus (Reinw., Blume & Nees) Schiffn.
- Heteroscyphus aselliformis (Reinw., Blume & Nees) Schiffn.
- Heteroscyphus assurgentifolius J.J.Engel
- Heteroscyphus assurgentissimus J.J.Engel, Thouvenot & Frank Müll., 2021
- Heteroscyphus baduinus (Nees) Schiffn.
- Heteroscyphus balnetii (Herzog) Grolle
- Heteroscyphus bescherellei (Stephani) S.Hatt.
- Heteroscyphus biciliatus (Hook.f. & Taylor) J.J.Engel
- Heteroscyphus billardierei (Schwägr.) Schiffn.
- Heteroscyphus brassii (Grolle) Grolle
- Heteroscyphus caesius (Schiffn.) Schiffn.
- Heteroscyphus caledonicus (Steph.) Schiffn.
- Heteroscyphus cambewarranus (Stephani) J.J.Engel & R.M.Schust.
- Heteroscyphus chlorophyllus (Hook.f. & Taylor) Schiffn.
- Heteroscyphus ciliatus (Steph.) Schiffn.
- Heteroscyphus circumdentatus (W.Martin & E.A.Hodgs.) J.J.Engel & R.M.Schust.
- Heteroscyphus coalitus (Hook.) Schiffn.
- Heteroscyphus combinatus (Nees) Schiffn.
- Heteroscyphus comptonii (Pearson) J.J.Engel & R.M.Schust.
- Heteroscyphus confertus (Steph.) Thouvenot
- Heteroscyphus conjugatus (Mitt.) J.J.Engel & R.M.Schust.
- Heteroscyphus contortuplicatus (Nees & Mont.) Grolle
- Heteroscyphus cuneistipulus (Steph.) Schiffn.
- Heteroscyphus cymbalifer (Hook.f. & Taylor) J.J.Engel & R.M.Schust.
- Heteroscyphus darjeelingensis A.Srivast. & S.C.Srivast.
- Heteroscyphus deceptifrons J.J.Engel
- Heteroscyphus decipiens (Gottsche) J.J.Engel & R.M.Schust.
- Heteroscyphus dentammophilus J.J.Engel & G.L.Merr.
- Heteroscyphus denticulatus (Mitt.) Schiffn.
- Heteroscyphus deplanchei (Steph.) Schiffn.
- Heteroscyphus diestianus (Sande Lac.) Piippo
- Heteroscyphus divergenticiliatus (Steph.) Fulford
- Heteroscyphus dubius (Gottsche) Schiffn.
- Heteroscyphus echinellus (Lindenb. & Gottsche) J.J.Engel & Xiao L.He
- Heteroscyphus elliottii (Steph.) Pagán
- Heteroscyphus erraticus (W.Martin & E.A.Hodgs.) J.J.Engel & R.M.Schust.
- Heteroscyphus falcifolius (Steph.) Schiffn.
- Heteroscyphus fissistipus (Hook.f. & Taylor) Schiffn.
- Heteroscyphus flaccidus (Mitt.) A.Srivast. & S.C.Srivast.
- Heteroscyphus fleischeri (Steph.) D.G.Long & Rubas.
- Heteroscyphus fragilicilius (Schiffn.) Schiffn.
- Heteroscyphus furcistipulus (E.A.Hodgs.) J.J.Engel & R.M.Schust.
- Heteroscyphus giganteus (Steph.) Hürl.
- Heteroscyphus graeffei (J.B.Jack & Steph.) Grolle
- Heteroscyphus grandiflorus (Steph.) Hürl.
- Heteroscyphus grandistipus (Steph.) Schiffn.
- Heteroscyphus gunnianus (Mitt.) J.J.Engel & R.M.Schust.
- Heteroscyphus hamatistipulus (Stephani) Schiffner
- Heteroscyphus hastatus (E.A.Hodgs.) J.J.Engel & R.M.Schust.
- Heteroscyphus hebridensis (Steph.) Schiffn.
- Heteroscyphus hyalinus (Steph.) A.Srivast. & S.C.Srivast.
- Heteroscyphus inflatus (Stephani) S.C.Srivast. & A.Srivast.
- Heteroscyphus integrifolius (Lehm. & Lindenb.) Fulford
- Heteroscyphus irregularis (Stephani) S.Hatt.
- Heteroscyphus iwatsukii (S.Hatt.) Piippo
- Heteroscyphus jackii (Steph.) Schiffn.
- Heteroscyphus kanakensis Thouvenot & J.J.Engel, 2021
- Heteroscyphus knightii (Steph.) Grolle
- Heteroscyphus levieri (Steph.) Schiffn.
- Heteroscyphus limosus (Carrington & Pearson) Schiffn.
- Heteroscyphus lingulatus (Colenso) J.J.Engel & R.M.Schust.
- Heteroscyphus loangensis (Stephani) Schiffner
- Heteroscyphus lophocoleoides S.Hatt.
- Heteroscyphus lyallii (Mitt.) R.M.Schust.
- Heteroscyphus magellanicus (Steph.) J.J.Engel & R.M.Schust.
- Heteroscyphus mamillatus Piippo
- Heteroscyphus marginatus (Steph.) Fulford
- Heteroscyphus maximus (Stephani) J.J.Engel & R.M.Schust.
- Heteroscyphus menziesii (Mitt.) J.J.Engel
- Heteroscyphus merapiensis (Steph.) Piippo
- Heteroscyphus miradorensis (Steph.) Schiffn.
- Heteroscyphus mononuculus J.J.Engel
- Heteroscyphus montagnei (Steph.) Fulford
- Heteroscyphus montanus (Colenso) J.J.Engel & R.M.Schust.
- Heteroscyphus moorei (Stephani) J.J.Engel & R.M.Schust.
- Heteroscyphus muelleri (Gottsche) J.J.Engel & R.M.Schust.
- Heteroscyphus multifidus (Steph.) J.J.Engel & R.M.Schust.
- Heteroscyphus nadeaudii (Steph.) Schiffn.
- Heteroscyphus oblongifolius (Hook.f. & Taylor) Schiffn.
- Heteroscyphus orbiculatus A.Srivast. & S.C.Srivast.
- Heteroscyphus palniensis A.Srivast. & S.C.Srivast.
- Heteroscyphus pandei S.C.Srivast. & A.Srivast.
- Heteroscyphus parallelifolius J.J.Engel
- Heteroscyphus parvulus (Schiffn.) Schiffn.
- Heteroscyphus parvus A.Srivast. & S.C.Srivast.
- Heteroscyphus perfoliatus (Mont.) Schiffn.
- Heteroscyphus pertusus (Lehm.) Fulford
- Heteroscyphus planiusculus (Hook.f. & Taylor) J.J.Engel
- Heteroscyphus planus (Mitt.) Schiffn.
- Heteroscyphus polyblepharis (Spruce) Schiffn.
- Heteroscyphus polychaetus (Spruce) Hentschel & Heinrichs
- Heteroscyphus polycladus (Hook.f. & Lév.) R.M.Schust.
- Heteroscyphus rectangulatus (Herzog) Piippo
- Heteroscyphus rotundiphyllus (H.A.Mill.) Thouvenot
- Heteroscyphus saccogynoides Herzog
- Heteroscyphus sarawaketanus Piippo
- Heteroscyphus sexdentatus (Stephani) J.J.Engel
- Heteroscyphus simillimus (Stephani) J.J.Engel & R.M.Schust.
- Heteroscyphus sinuosus (Hook.) Schiffn.
- Heteroscyphus spectabilis (Steph.) Schiffn.
- Heteroscyphus spinifer C.Gao, T.Cao & Y.H.Wu
- Heteroscyphus spiniferus C.Gao, T.Cao & Y.H.Wu
- Heteroscyphus splendens (Lehm. & Lindenb.) Grolle
- Heteroscyphus splendidus (E.A.Hodgs.) J.J.Engel & R.M.Schust.
- Heteroscyphus stolonifer J.J.Engel
- Heteroscyphus succulentus (Gottsche) Schiffn.
- Heteroscyphus supinopsis J.J.Engel, Thouvenot & Frank Müll., 2021
- Heteroscyphus supinus (Hook.f. & Taylor) R.M.Schust.
- Heteroscyphus tasmanicus (Stephani) J.J.Engel & R.M.Schust.
- Heteroscyphus tener (Steph.) Schiffn.
- Heteroscyphus thraustus (Spruce) Fulford
- Heteroscyphus timppae Piippo
- Heteroscyphus triacanthus (Hook.f. & Lév.) Schiffn.
- Heteroscyphus tridentatus (Sande Lac.) Grolle
- Heteroscyphus turgidus (Schiffn.) Schiffn.
- Heteroscyphus udarii S.C.Srivast. & A.Srivast.
- Heteroscyphus valdiviensis (Mont.) Schiffn.
- Heteroscyphus varians (Steph.) J.J.Engel
- Heteroscyphus wettsteinii (Schiffn.) Schiffn.
- Heteroscyphus zollingeri (Gottsche) Schiffn.
