= Hepatostolonophora =

Scientific classification
- Kingdom: Plantae
- Division: Marchantiophyta
- Class: Jungermanniopsida
- Order: Lepidoziales
- Family: Lophocoleaceae
- Genus: Hepatostolonophora; J.J.Engel & R.M.Schust.

Synonyms
- Cryptostipula R.M.Schust. Stolonophora J.J.Engel & R.M.Schust.

Genus of plants

Hepatostolonophora is a genus of liverworts belonging to the family Lophocoleaceae.

They are found in the Southern Hemisphere, including New Zealand and Australia.

== Species ==
As accepted by GBIF;

- Hepatostolonophora abnormis (Besch. & C.Massal.) J.J.Engel & R.M.Schust.
- Hepatostolonophora conica (Steph.) Hässel
- Hepatostolonophora paucistipula (Rodway) J.J.Engel
- Hepatostolonophora rotata (Hook.f. & Taylor) J.J.Engel
