= Clasmatocolea =

Scientific classification
- Kingdom: Plantae
- Division: Marchantiophyta
- Class: Jungermanniopsida
- Order: Lepidoziales
- Family: Lophocoleaceae
- Genus: Clasmatocolea; Spruce

Genus of liverworts

Clasmatocolea is a genus of liverworts belonging to the family Lophocoleaceae.

== Species ==
The genus has 28 accepted species:

- Clasmatocolea alpina (Rodway) Grolle
- Clasmatocolea amplectens (Mitt.) J.J.Engel
- Clasmatocolea bisexualis Glenny & J.J.Engel
- Clasmatocolea crassiretis (Herzog) Grolle
- Clasmatocolea ctenophylla (Schiffn.) Grolle
- Clasmatocolea cucullistipula (Steph.) Grolle
- Clasmatocolea exigua Stephani
- Clasmatocolea fasciculata (Nees) Grolle
- Clasmatocolea fragillima Spruce
- Clasmatocolea fulvella (Hook.f. & Taylor) Grolle
- Clasmatocolea gayana (Mont.) Grolle
- Clasmatocolea heterostipa Spruce
- Clasmatocolea humilis (Hook.f. & Taylor) Grolle
- Clasmatocolea inflexispina (Hook.f. & Taylor) J.J.Engel
- Clasmatocolea innovata Herzog
- Clasmatocolea marginata (Steph.) Grolle
- Clasmatocolea minutiretis J.J.Engel & Grolle
- Clasmatocolea moniliformis J.J.Engel
- Clasmatocolea navistipula (Steph.) Grolle
- Clasmatocolea notophylla (Hook.f. & Taylor) Grolle
- Clasmatocolea obvoluta (Hook.f. & Taylor) Grolle
- Clasmatocolea puccioana (De Not.) Grolle
- Clasmatocolea rigens (Hook.f. & Taylor) J.J.Engel
- Clasmatocolea strongylophylla (Hook.f. & Taylor) Grolle
- Clasmatocolea trachyopa (Hook.f. & Taylor) Grolle
- Clasmatocolea trachypus (Hook.f. & Taylor) Grolle
- Clasmatocolea vermicularis (Lehm.) Grolle
- Clasmatocolea verrucosa J.J.Engel
