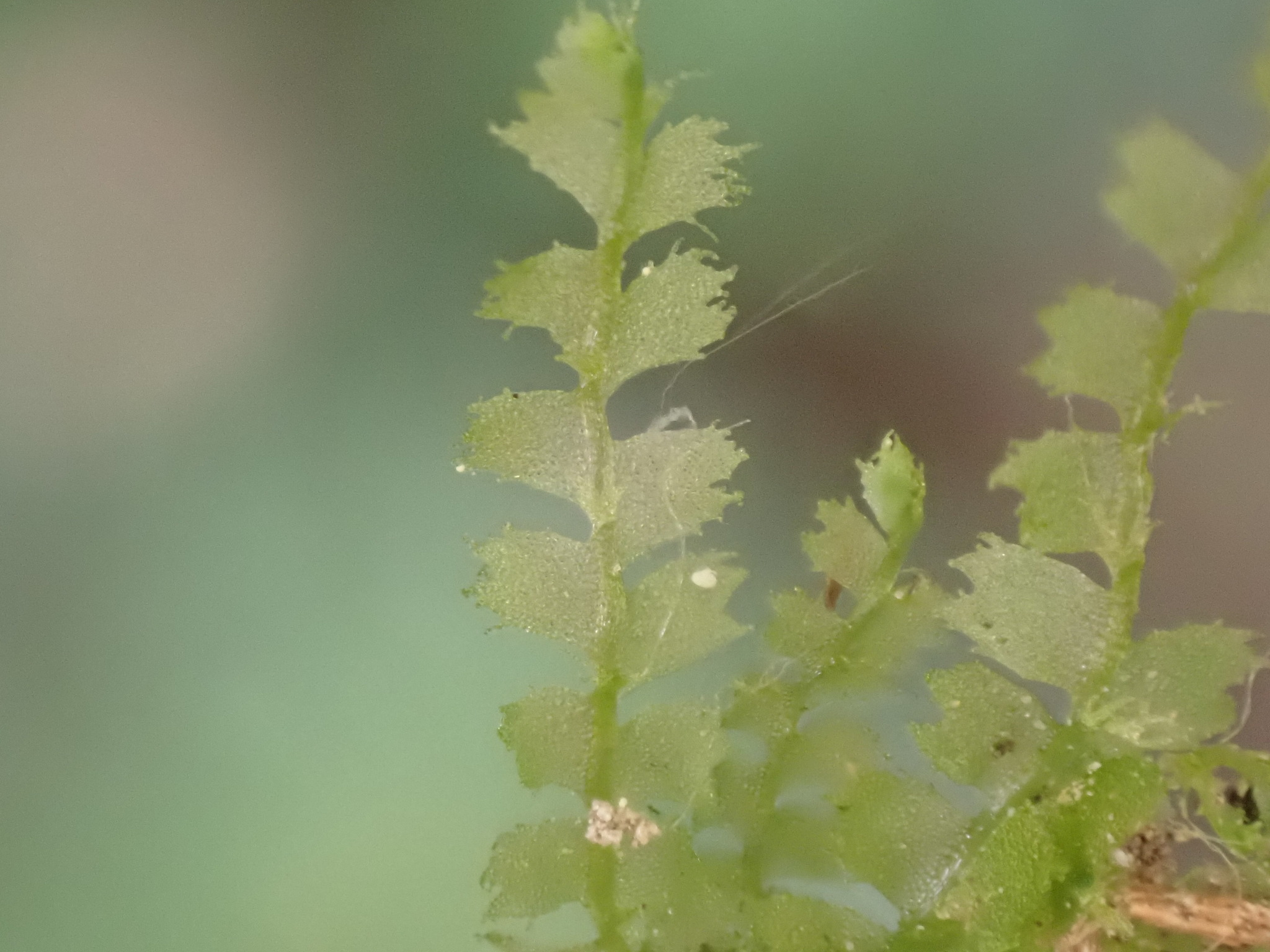

Scientific classification
- Kingdom: Plantae
- Division: Marchantiophyta
- Class: Jungermanniopsida
- Order: Lepidoziales
- Family: Lophocoleaceae
- Genus: Leptophyllopsis; R.M.Schust.
- Species: L. laxa

Binomial name
- Leptophyllopsis laxa (Mitt.) R.M.Schust.

= Leptophyllopsis =

Species of plant

Leptophyllopsis laxa is a species of liverwort in the family Lophocoleaceae. It is the only member of the genus Leptophyllopsis.

== Description ==
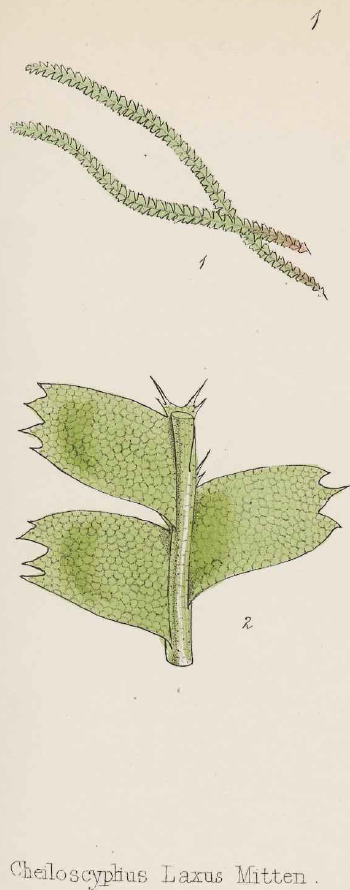
Type drawing of Leptophyllopsis (Cheiloscyphus) laxa from Flora Antarctica

Leptophyllopsis laxa is a small liverwort, its shoots pale green, translucent, and up to 3 mm (0.12 in) wide. The leaves have a characteristic ragged appearance, due to the formation of adventive caducous teeth on their margins.

== Taxonomy ==
While the genus was originally described as monotypic,, another species from southern South America was later placed in Leptophyllopis as L. irregularis. This taxon was later found to be synonymous with an earlier name, Chiloscyphus subviridis, and removed from Leptophyllopsis.

== Range ==
Leptophyllopsis laxa can be found throughout most of New Zealand, including Stewart Island and the sub-Antarctic Islands Campbell and the Auckland Islands. It is also present in Australia, primarily in south-eastern regions.

== Habitat ==
Leptophyllopsis laxa forms soft thin mats, usually over soil and tree bases in southern beech forests. It grows more frequently in mid- to upper-elevation, rather than lowland, forests, particularly in northern parts of its range.
