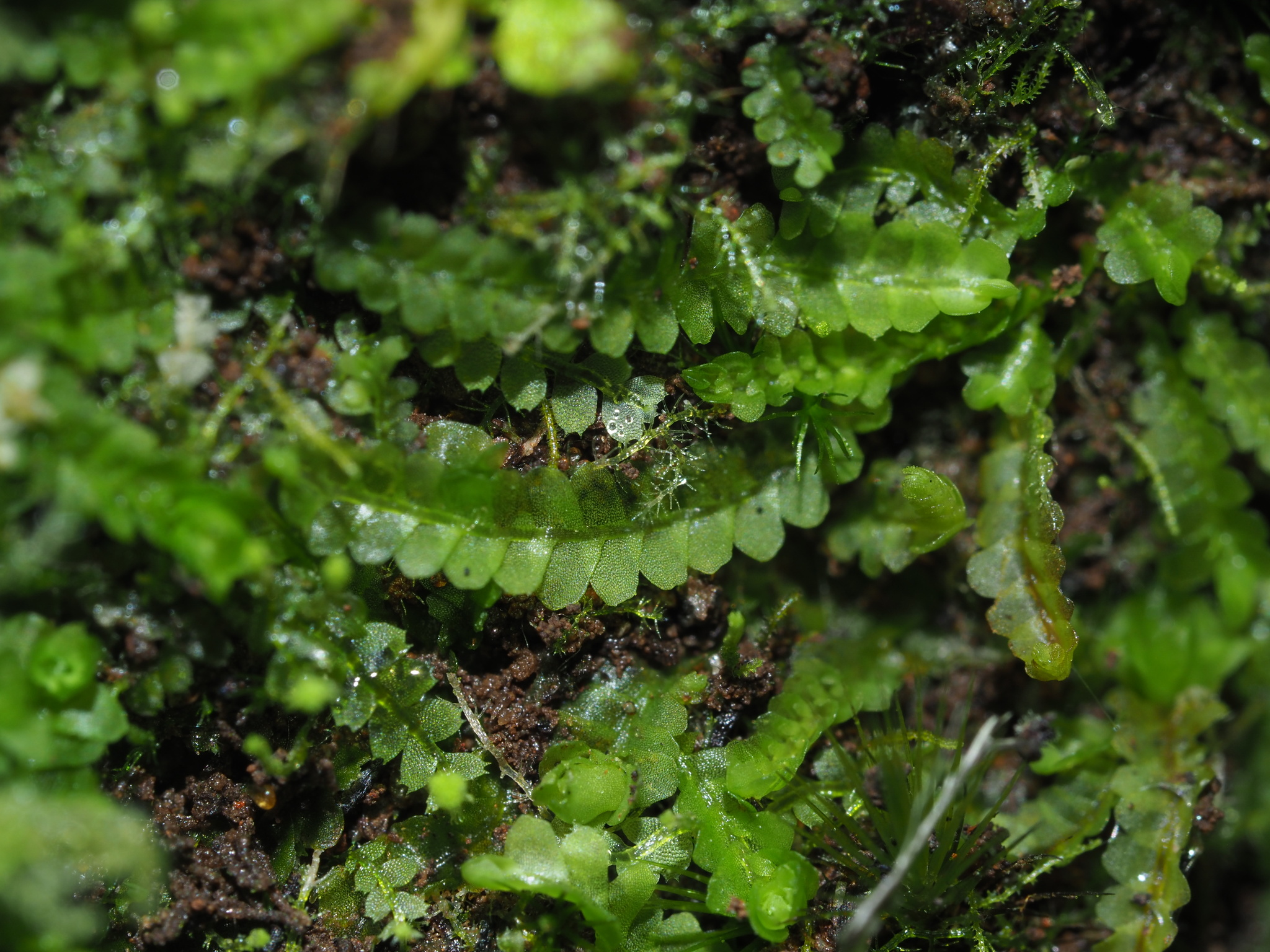
- Chiloscyphus greenwelliae

Scientific classification
- Kingdom: Plantae
- Division: Marchantiophyta
- Class: Jungermanniopsida
- Order: Lepidoziales
- Family: Lophocoleaceae
- Genus: Chiloscyphus; Corda

Type species
- Chiloscyphus polyanthos (L.) Corda

= Chiloscyphus =

Genus of liverworts

Chiloscyphus is a genus of liverworts belonging to the family Lophocoleaceae.

The genus has a cosmopolitan distribution. In 2010, John J. Engel published a monograph on the Australasian species in this genus.

== Species ==
As accepted by GBIF;

- Chiloscyphus acutus Steph.
- Chiloscyphus alpicola J.J.Engel
- Chiloscyphus amplectens (Mitt.) J.J.Engel & R.M.Schust.
- Chiloscyphus angulatus (Stephani) J.J.Engel & R.M.Schust.
- Chiloscyphus anisolobus J.J.Engel & Glenny
- Chiloscyphus archeri J.J.Engel & R.M.Schust.
- Chiloscyphus argenteus (Stephani) J.J.Engel & R.M.Schust.
- Chiloscyphus armatistipulus Stephani
- Chiloscyphus asperrimus Stephani
- Chiloscyphus australis Taylor
- Chiloscyphus austro-alpinus J.J.Engel & R.M.Schust.
- Chiloscyphus banksianus Gottsche
- Chiloscyphus beecheyanus (Taylor) J.J.Engel & R.M.Schust.
- Chiloscyphus beesleyanus Pearson
- Chiloscyphus belmoranus (Stephani) J.J.Engel & R.M.Schust.
- Chiloscyphus bifidus Schiffn.
- Chiloscyphus bowieanus (Stephani) J.J.Engel & R.M.Schust.
- Chiloscyphus brasiliensis (Schiffner) J.J.Engel & R.M.Schust.
- Chiloscyphus breviculus B.Y.Yang & W.C.Lee
- Chiloscyphus brevis (Stephani) J.J.Engel & R.M.Schust.
- Chiloscyphus brevistipulus Steph.
- Chiloscyphus bridelii (Lehm.) J.J.Engel & R.M.Schust.
- Chiloscyphus ceylonensis J.J.Engel
- Chiloscyphus cheesemanii (Stephani) J.J.Engel & R.M.Schust.
- Chiloscyphus chilensis J.J.Engel & R.M.Schust.
- Chiloscyphus chiloscyphoideus (Lindenb. ex Lehm.) Vanderpoorten, A.Schäfer-Verwimp & D.G.Long
- Chiloscyphus chinnarensis Manju, K.P.Rajesh & Madhus.
- Chiloscyphus christophersenii (S.W.Arnell) J.J.Engel & R.M.Schust.
- Chiloscyphus ciliifer (Stephani) J.J.Engel & R.M.Schust.
- Chiloscyphus ciliolatoides J.J.Engel & R.M.Schust.
- Chiloscyphus concavus (Stephani) Hässel de Menéndez
- Chiloscyphus confertifolius Steph.
- Chiloscyphus congoanus (Stephani) J.J.Engel & R.M.Schust.
- Chiloscyphus cordifolius (Stephani) J.J.Engel & R.M.Schust.
- Chiloscyphus cornutistipulus Steph.
- Chiloscyphus corticola (Stephani) J.J.Engel & R.M.Schust.
- Chiloscyphus costatoides J.J.Engel & R.M.Schust.
- Chiloscyphus crenulifolius (Stephani) J.J.Engel & R.M.Schust.
- Chiloscyphus dallianus (Stephani) J.J.Engel & R.M.Schust.
- Chiloscyphus decoloratus (Stephani) J.J.Engel & R.M.Schust.
- Chiloscyphus defectistipulus (Stephani) J.J.Engel & R.M.Schust.
- Chiloscyphus devexus (Mitt.) J.J.Engel & R.M.Schust.
- Chiloscyphus dicyclophorus Colenso
- Chiloscyphus divaricatus (Hook.f. & Taylor) J.J.Engel & R.M.Schust.
- Chiloscyphus durus (Steph.) Hässel
- Chiloscyphus elatus (Gottsche) J.J.Engel & R.M.Schust.
- Chiloscyphus endlicherianus (Nees) Nees
- Chiloscyphus engelii R.L.Zhu & M.J.Lai
- Chiloscyphus ernstianus Steph.
- Chiloscyphus etesseanus Steph.
- Chiloscyphus fissistipulus (Stephani) J.J.Engel & R.M.Schust.
- Chiloscyphus fleischeri Steph.
- Chiloscyphus floribundus Stephani
- Chiloscyphus forsythianus (Stephani) J.J.Engel & R.M.Schust.
- Chiloscyphus francanus Steph.
- Chiloscyphus fulvus (Stephani) J.J.Engel & R.M.Schust.
- Chiloscyphus gaudichaudii (Mont.) J.J.Engel & R.M.Schust.
- Chiloscyphus geheebii (Stephani) J.J.Engel & R.M.Schust.
- Chiloscyphus gemmiparus A.Evans
- Chiloscyphus gippslandicus J.J.Engel & R.M.Schust.
- Chiloscyphus giulianettii (Stephani) J.J.Engel & R.M.Schust.
- Chiloscyphus gracillimus (S.W.Arnell) J.J.Engel & R.M.Schust.
- Chiloscyphus graeffeanus Steph.
- Chiloscyphus greenwelliae (H.A.Mill.) H.A.Mill.
- Chiloscyphus guadeloupensis (Stephani) J.J.Engel & R.M.Schust.
- Chiloscyphus hasskarlianus (Gottsche) J.J.Engel & R.M.Schust.
- Chiloscyphus helferi Corda
- Chiloscyphus herzogii J.J.Engel & R.M.Schust.
- Chiloscyphus heterostipus (Spruce) Hässel de Menéndez
- Chiloscyphus hians (Stephani) J.J.Engel & R.M.Schust.
- Chiloscyphus hookeri J.J.Engel
- Chiloscyphus insularis (Stephani) J.J.Engel & R.M.Schust.
- Chiloscyphus integerrimus Schiffn.
- Chiloscyphus integristipulus (Stephani) J.J.Engel & R.M.Schust.
- Chiloscyphus jackii Stephani
- Chiloscyphus japonicus Stephani
- Chiloscyphus javanicus Stephani
- Chiloscyphus jelinekii (Reichardt) J.J.Engel & R.M.Schust.
- Chiloscyphus kashyapii A.Srivast. & S.C.Srivast.
- Chiloscyphus kegelii Stephani
- Chiloscyphus kehdingianus (Steph.) N.Kitag.
- Chiloscyphus kerguelensis (Gottsche ex Stephani) J.J.Engel & R.M.Schust.
- Chiloscyphus kilauensis Steph.
- Chiloscyphus koeppensis (Gottsche) Steph.
- Chiloscyphus laceratus Steph.
- Chiloscyphus lambertonii H.A.Mill.
- Chiloscyphus latistipus Steph.
- Chiloscyphus lauterbachii Stephani
- Chiloscyphus lepervanchei (Steph.) J.J.Engel & R.M.Schust.
- Chiloscyphus leratii J.J.Engel & R.M.Schust.
- Chiloscyphus longifissus Steph.
- Chiloscyphus longistipulus (Stephani) J.J.Engel & R.M.Schust.
- Chiloscyphus lucidus (Spreng. ex Lehm. & Lindenb.) Nees
- Chiloscyphus macrolobus (Stephani) J.J.Engel & R.M.Schust.
- Chiloscyphus macrostipulus (Stephani) J.J.Engel & R.M.Schust.
- Chiloscyphus maluanus (Stephani) J.J.Engel & R.M.Schust.
- Chiloscyphus mancus Mont.
- Chiloscyphus marginatus (Stephani) Hässel de Menéndez
- Chiloscyphus mascarenensis S.W.Arnell
- Chiloscyphus massalongoanus Stephani
- Chiloscyphus micholitzii J.J.Engel & R.M.Schust.
- Chiloscyphus microstipulus Stephani
- Chiloscyphus monoicus J.J.Engel & R.M.Schust.
- Chiloscyphus mooreanus (Stephani) J.J.Engel & R.M.Schust.
- Chiloscyphus multipennus (Hook.f. & Taylor) J.J.Engel & R.M.Schust.
- Chiloscyphus nesnifolius De Not.
- Chiloscyphus novae-caledoniae J.J.Engel & R.M.Schust.
- Chiloscyphus oblatistipulus Herzog
- Chiloscyphus occidentalis (Stephani) J.J.Engel & R.M.Schust.
- Chiloscyphus ofquiensis (Herzog) J.J.Engel & R.M.Schust.
- Chiloscyphus oldfieldianus (Stephani) J.J.Engel & R.M.Schust.
- Chiloscyphus olivaceus (Stephani) J.J.Engel & R.M.Schust.
- Chiloscyphus orizabensis Gottsche
- Chiloscyphus pallescens (Ehrh. ex Hoffm.) Dumort.
- Chiloscyphus parapilistipulus Thouvenot, 2020
- Chiloscyphus paroicus J.J.Engel & R.M.Schust.
- Chiloscyphus parvistipulus Steph.
- Chiloscyphus pearsonii J.J.Engel & R.M.Schust.
- Chiloscyphus philippinensis J.J.Engel & R.M.Schust.
- Chiloscyphus polyanthos (L.) Corda
- Chiloscyphus pringlei Stephani
- Chiloscyphus profundus (Nees) J.J.Engel & R.M.Schust.
- Chiloscyphus propagulifer Schiffn.
- Chiloscyphus purpureus Steph.
- Chiloscyphus quadricilius Steph.
- Chiloscyphus quadridentatus (Spruce) J.J.Engel & R.M.Schust.
- Chiloscyphus rabenhorstii Stephani
- Chiloscyphus reflexistipulus (Stephani) J.J.Engel & R.M.Schust.
- Chiloscyphus regularis Stephani
- Chiloscyphus renauldii Stephani
- Chiloscyphus retroversus Schiffner
- Chiloscyphus rotundifolius Mitt.
- Chiloscyphus samoanus J.J.Engel & R.M.Schust.
- Chiloscyphus saxicola (P.Beauv.) J.J.Engel & R.M.Schust.
- Chiloscyphus scaberulus Spruce
- Chiloscyphus schiffneri J.J.Engel & R.M.Schust.
- Chiloscyphus sellingii (S.W.Arnell) J.J.Engel & R.M.Schust.
- Chiloscyphus septatus J.J.Engel
- Chiloscyphus sexdentatus (Stephani) J.J.Engel & R.M.Schust.
- Chiloscyphus similis Steph.
- Chiloscyphus sinensis J.J.Engel & R.M.Schust.
- Chiloscyphus sintenisii (Stephani) J.J.Engel & R.M.Schust.
- Chiloscyphus skottsbergianus H.A.Mill.
- Chiloscyphus spinifer (Hook.f. & Taylor) J.J.Engel & R.M.Schust.
- Chiloscyphus spinosus (Gottsche) J.J.Engel & R.M.Schust.
- Chiloscyphus spongiosus (Stephani) J.J.Engel & R.M.Schust.
- Chiloscyphus spruceanus Colenso
- Chiloscyphus squamatus (Herzog) J.J.Engel & R.M.Schust.
- Chiloscyphus stephanii N.Kitag.
- Chiloscyphus subacuminatus Herzog
- Chiloscyphus subsimilis Steph.
- Chiloscyphus surrepens (Hook.f. & Taylor) Taylor
- Chiloscyphus taminus (Stephani) J.J.Engel & R.M.Schust.
- Chiloscyphus trachypus (Hook.f. & Taylor) Hässel de Menéndez
- Chiloscyphus tridens Steph.
- Chiloscyphus tridentatus Mitt.
- Chiloscyphus trigonifolius Steph.
- Chiloscyphus umidus (Stephani) J.J.Engel & R.M.Schust.
- Chiloscyphus variabilis (Stephani) J.J.Engel & R.M.Schust.
- Chiloscyphus velleanus (Stephani) J.J.Engel & R.M.Schust.
- Chiloscyphus venustulus Colenso
- Chiloscyphus verrucosus (Stephani) J.J.Engel & R.M.Schust.
- Chiloscyphus villosus (Mitt. ex Stephani) J.J.Engel & R.M.Schust.
- Chiloscyphus vulcanicus Colenso
- Chiloscyphus wattsianus (Stephani) J.J.Engel & R.M.Schust.
- Chiloscyphus yezoensis T.Katag., Furuki & Bryol.Res.
