= Jean Paton =

British bryologist and botanical illustrator (1929–2026)

Jean Annette Paton MBE
- Born: 4 January 1929
- Died: 10 August 2026 (aged 97); Truro, Cornwall, England
- Education: Bedford College for Women
- Awards: Jill Smythies Award (2000)
- Scientific career
- Fields: Bryology
- Workplaces: University of Southampton
- Author abbrev. (botany): Paton

Jean Annette Paton MBE (née Comins or Comyn; 4 January 1929 – 10 August 2026) was a British botanist, bryologist and botanical illustrator. She wrote many books on the bryology of the United Kingdom and the flora of Cornwall, and described several new species.

Paton has been called the "queen of vice-county recording" for her prolific records of bryological specimens in the second half of the 20th century. She was president of the British Bryological Society in 1976 and 1977.

== Early life and education ==
Paton was born on 4 January 1929. She was dyslexic and could not read until she was nine. Paton taught herself to draw and paint flowers when she was young, which later helped her to learn their names.

Paton attended Bedford College, London from 1947. She later completed an MSc with a dissertation on the bryophytes of the sandstone rocks of Kent and Sussex.

== Career ==
Paton began work in the Botany Department at the University of Southampton in 1952 as a research and herbarium assistant, and later became a lecturer there. In 1959, she moved to Cornwall with her husband Pat. There, she wrote Wild Flowers in Cornwall and the Isles of Scilly and Flowers of the Cornish Coast published in 1968 and 1969 respectively.

Her The Liverwort Flora of the British Isles was published in 1999 and was described as the "best liverwort flora ever published in Europe". Eric Vernon Watson called it a "landmark in the study of British liverworts". Paton won the Linnean Society's Jill Smythies Award in May 2000 for her illustrations in the book, and the International Association of Bryologists Sinske Hattori Prize for the best publication of 1999/2000. Paton published a supplement to The Liverwort Flora in 2022.

In 2001, she and Pat published Magnolias in Cornish Gardens and in 2005, she published Bryophyte Flora of the Isles of Scilly with David Holyoak.

Throughout her career, Paton described a number of species new to science, including Anthoceros agrestis, Ditrichum cornubicum, Lophocolea brookwoodiana, Telaranea murphyae and Fissidens celticus. In addition to this, she added many species to the list of bryophytes known in Britain, including Southbya tophacea, Lophocolea semeteres, and Marsupella profunda.

Between 1947 and 1999, Paton was the top recorder of specimens in Britain, recording 1,924 of the 22,532 specimens in the period. Her herbariums were added to the collections of the Royal Botanic Garden, Edinburgh, and to the Natural History Museum, London.

== Honours ==
Paton was president of the British Bryological Society in 1976 and 1977 and was elected an honorary member in 1987. She was awarded an MBE in the 2003 New Year Honours for services to biology and nature conservation.

== Personal life and death ==
Paton married Valentine 'Pat' Paton in October 1952. She died at Treliske Hospital, Truro on 10 August 2026 at the age of 97.
