= Bragginsella =

Scientific classification
- Kingdom: Plantae
- Division: Marchantiophyta
- Class: Jungermanniopsida
- Order: Lepidoziales
- Family: Lophocoleaceae
- Genus: Bragginsella
- Species: Bragginsella

Binomial name
- Bragginsella R.M.Schust.

Monotypic genus of liverwort

Bragginsella is a monotypic genus of liverworts belonging to the family Lophocoleaceae. The sole species of this genus, Bragginsella anomala R.M.Schust. is found in New Zealand.

== Etymology ==
The genus name of Bragginsella is in honour of John Edward Braggins (b.1944) a New Zealand born botanist (Pteridology, Mycology, Lichenology), from the University of Auckland and the Auckland Museum for Natural Sciences. The species epithet anomala was chosen to describe its anomalous appearance.

== Description ==
Bragginsella anomala is a light green liverwort, which has highly dome-shaped papillae on the cuticle of its calls.

== Distribution and habitat ==
Bragginsella anomala is endemic to New Zealand. The holotype was discovered at Temple Basin in Arthur's Pass National Park, occurring in wet cliff crevices.
