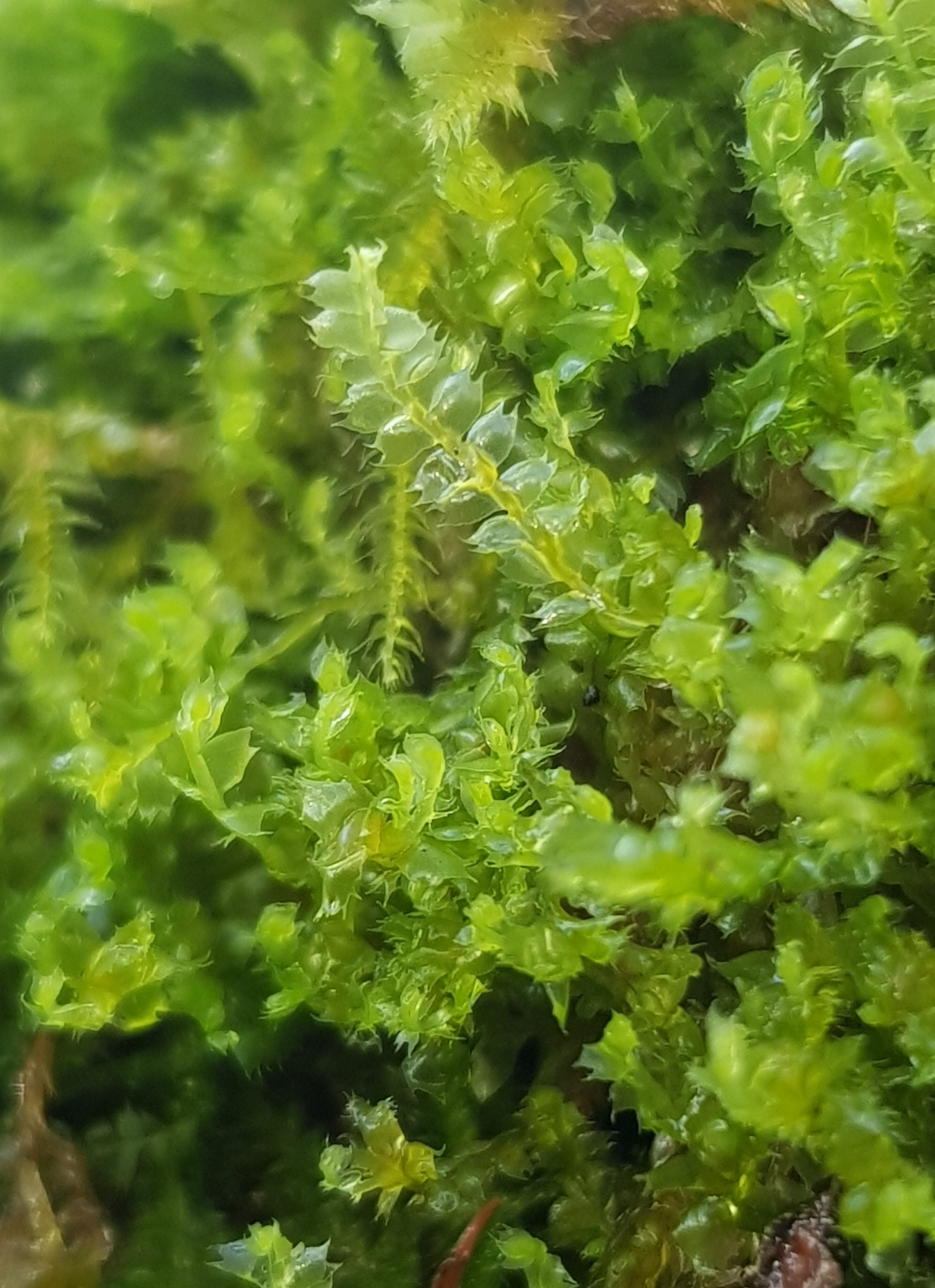
- Lophocolea bidentata

Scientific classification
- Kingdom: Plantae
- Division: Marchantiophyta
- Class: Jungermanniopsida
- Order: Lepidoziales
- Family: Lophocoleaceae
- Genus: Lophocolea (Dumort.) Dumort.

Synonyms
- Campanocolea R.M.Schust.

= Lophocolea =

Genus of liverworts

Lophocolea is a genus of liverworts belonging to the family Lophocoleaceae. The genus has a cosmopolitan distribution.

== Species ==
Accepted species according to GBIF include;

- Lophocolea aberrans Lindenb. & Gottsche
- Lophocolea aequifolia Nees & Mont.
- Lophocolea alata Mitt.
- Lophocolea alpina Steph.
- Lophocolea angustistipula Steph.
- Lophocolea anomala Steph.
- Lophocolea anomoda (Mont.) Steph.
- Lophocolea apalachicola R.M.Schust.
- Lophocolea aperticaulis (J.J.Engel) L.Söderstr.
- Lophocolea aphelophylla (Hässel) Váňa
- Lophocolea apophylla (Hässel) Váňa
- Lophocolea appalachiana R.M.Schust.
- Lophocolea arisancola Horik.
- Lophocolea armatistipula Stephani
- Lophocolea ascensionis Steph.
- Lophocolea asperrima Steph.
- Lophocolea atra Gola
- Lophocolea attenuata Steph.
- Lophocolea aucklandica Stephani
- Lophocolea australis Gottsche
- Lophocolea autoica Steph.
- Lophocolea azopardana Stephani
- Lophocolea baccarinii Gola
- Lophocolea baldwinii Steph.
- Lophocolea bartlettii H.A.Mill.
- Lophocolea bewsii (Sim) Grolle
- Lophocolea bicuspidata Steph.
- Lophocolea bidentata (L.) Dumort.
- Lophocolea bifidistipula Steph.
- Lophocolea bispinosa (Hook.f. & Taylor) Gottsche, Lindenb. & Nees
- Lophocolea blepharoptera Spruce
- Lophocolea boliviensis Steph.
- Lophocolea bootanensis Steph.
- Lophocolea boulyana Steph.
- Lophocolea bowiena Steph.
- Lophocolea brachydonta Spruce
- Lophocolea brookwoodiana Paton & Sheahan
- Lophocolea caespitans Steph.
- Lophocolea cagnii Gola
- Lophocolea calcarea Steph.
- Lophocolea caledonica Steph.
- Lophocolea canaliculata (Gottsche, Lindenb. & Nees) Steph.
- Lophocolea canelensis Spruce
- Lophocolea cavispina (Hook.f. & Taylor) Fulford
- Lophocolea cellulosocrenulata Steph.
- Lophocolea cervicornis Steph.
- Lophocolea ciliifera Steph.
- Lophocolea coadunata (Sw.) Mont.
- Lophocolea columbica Gottsche
- Lophocolea concreta Mont.
- Lophocolea convexula Mitt.
- Lophocolea crossitexta Steph.
- Lophocolea decurrens Herzog
- Lophocolea deningeri Herzog
- Lophocolea dentiflora Steph.
- Lophocolea difformis Nees
- Lophocolea discedens (Lehm. & Lindenb.) Lehm. & Lindenb.
- Lophocolea divaricata Hook.f. & Taylor
- Lophocolea dusenii Steph.
- Lophocolea elata (Gottsche) Stephani
- Lophocolea epiphylla Herzog
- Lophocolea erosa (J.J.Engel) L.Söderstr.
- Lophocolea esterhuysenii S.W.Arnell ex E.W.Jones
- Lophocolea excisifolia Steph.
- Lophocolea fertilis (J.J.Engel) L.Söderstr.
- Lophocolea flavescens Stephani
- Lophocolea flavicans Steph.
- Lophocolea fleischeri Steph.
- Lophocolea floribunda Steph.
- Lophocolea foliicola Spruce
- Lophocolea formosana Horik.
- Lophocolea fragillima Steph.
- Lophocolea fragmentissima R.M.Schust.
- Lophocolea fragrans (Moris & De Not.) Gottsche, Lindenb. & Nees
- Lophocolea glaziovii Steph.
- Lophocolea gollanii (Steph.) Váňa
- Lophocolea granatensis Gottsche
- Lophocolea granulosa Gottsche
- Lophocolea griffithiana Steph.
- Lophocolea grossitexta Steph.
- Lophocolea hahnii Steph.
- Lophocolea hariotii Steph.
- Lophocolea haskarliana Gottsche
- Lophocolea hattorii (J.J.Engel) L.Söderstr.
- Lophocolea hawaica Steph.
- Lophocolea heterodonta Steph.
- Lophocolea heteromorpha Steph.
- Lophocolea heterophylla (Schrad.) Dumort.
- Lophocolea horikawana S.Hatt.
- Lophocolea howeana Steph.
- Lophocolea humifusa (Hook.f. & Taylor) Gottsche, Lindenb. & Nees
- Lophocolea humistrata (Hook.f. & Taylor) Gottsche, Lindenb. & Nees
- Lophocolea innovata E.A.Hodgs.
- Lophocolea irrigata Spruce
- Lophocolea itoana Inoue
- Lophocolea japonica Stephani
- Lophocolea javanica Schiffn.
- Lophocolea koponenii (Piippo) Váňa
- Lophocolea kurzii Sande Lac.
- Lophocolea laceristipula Steph.
- Lophocolea lamellicalyx Herzog
- Lophocolea latistipula Steph.
- Lophocolea lauterbachii Steph.
- Lophocolea laxissima Herzog
- Lophocolea lechleri Gottsche
- Lophocolea ledermannii Steph.
- Lophocolea lenta (Hook.f. & Taylor) Gottsche, Lindenb. & Nees
- Lophocolea leptantha (Hook.f. & Taylor) Gottsche, Lindenb. & Nees
- Lophocolea liebmanniana Gottsche
- Lophocolea lindmannii Steph.
- Lophocolea longiciliata Herzog
- Lophocolea longiflora Hampe ex Gottsche
- Lophocolea longifolia Stephani
- Lophocolea longiseta Steph.
- Lophocolea longissima Steph.
- Lophocolea lorentiana Stephani
- Lophocolea lucida (Spreng.) Mont.
- Lophocolea madagascariensis Gottsche
- Lophocolea magna (Udar & V.Nath) Váňa
- Lophocolea magniperianthia Horik.
- Lophocolea mediinfrons (J.J.Engel & Braggins) L.Söderstr.
- Lophocolea micronesica Inoue & H.A.Mill.
- Lophocolea microstipula Steph.
- Lophocolea minor Nees
- Lophocolea minutistipula Steph.
- Lophocolea mollis (Nees) Nees
- Lophocolea morobeana Piippo
- Lophocolea muenchiana Stephani
- Lophocolea muhavurensis (S.W.Arnell) S.W.Arnell ex Pócs
- Lophocolea multialata Herzog
- Lophocolea muricata (Lehm.) Nees
- Lophocolea nakajimae S.Hatt. & Inoue
- Lophocolea novae-zeelandiae (Lehm. & Lindenb.) Nees
- Lophocolea obscura Stephani
- Lophocolea onraedtii Grolle
- Lophocolea orbigniana Nees & Mont.
- Lophocolea osculati De Not.
- Lophocolea ovistipula Herzog
- Lophocolea papulimarginata H.A.Mill.
- Lophocolea papulosa Stephani
- Lophocolea parca (Gottsche) Fulford & Sharp
- Lophocolea parva Steph.
- Lophocolea parvispinea (J.J.Engel) L.Söderstr.
- Lophocolea parvistipula Steph.
- Lophocolea patulistipa Steph.
- Lophocolea perpusilla (Hook.f. & Taylor) Gottsche, Lindenb. & Nees
- Lophocolea piacenzai (Gola) Váňa
- Lophocolea pilistipula Steph.
- Lophocolea pinnatistipula Steph.
- Lophocolea platensis C.Massal.
- Lophocolea pseudoverrucosa Horik.
- Lophocolea purpurea Steph.
- Lophocolea pusilla Steph.
- Lophocolea pycnorhiza Spruce
- Lophocolea quadridens Stephani
- Lophocolea randii S.W.Arnell
- Lophocolea rara Steph.
- Lophocolea rectangularis Herzog
- Lophocolea rectangulata Mitt.
- Lophocolea regularis Stephani
- Lophocolea rehmannii Stephani
- Lophocolea rupicola Steph.
- Lophocolea sabuletorum (Hook.f. & Taylor) Gottsche, Lindenb. & Nees
- Lophocolea salacensis Steph.
- Lophocolea savesiana Steph.
- Lophocolea semiteres (Lehm.) Mitt.
- Lophocolea serrata Mitt.
- Lophocolea siamensis Steph.
- Lophocolea sikkimensis (Steph.) Herzog & Grolle
- Lophocolea silvestris Gottsche
- Lophocolea steetziae De Not.
- Lophocolea stephanii Herzog
- Lophocolea striatella (C.Massal.) Schiffn.
- Lophocolea subbidentata Herzog
- Lophocolea subemarginata Hook.f. & Taylor
- Lophocolea subintegra (Hook.f. & Taylor) Grolle
- Lophocolea submuricata Herzog
- Lophocolea subporosa Mitt.
- Lophocolea subscorpionifolia Herzog
- Lophocolea subulistipa Herzog
- Lophocolea subviridis (Hook.f. & Taylor) Gottsche, Lindenb. & Nees
- Lophocolea sumatrana Schiffn.
- Lophocolea sylvatica Mitt.
- Lophocolea tasmanica Mitt.
- Lophocolea tenera Ångstr.
- Lophocolea tenerrima Spruce
- Lophocolea teptepensis Piippo
- Lophocolea terminalis Lindenb. & Gottsche
- Lophocolea textilis (Hook.f. & Taylor) Gottsche, Lindenb. & Nees
- Lophocolea textiloidea J.J.Engel
- Lophocolea trapezoides Mont.
- Lophocolea trichocoleoides (Glenny, J.J.Engel & He-Nygrén) L.Söderstr.
- Lophocolea tricuspidata Herzog
- Lophocolea tristaniana S.W.Arnell
- Lophocolea turgescens E.A.Hodgs.
- Lophocolea undulata Mont.
- Lophocolea villosa Mitt.
- Lophocolea vinciguerreana C.Massal.
- Lophocolea wacei (S.W.Arnell ex J.J.Engel & Váňa) Váňa & L.Söderstr.
- Lophocolea wambana Piippo
- Lophocolea wehmeri Steph.
- Lophocolea werthii (J.J.Engel & R.M.Schust.) Váňa & L.Söderstr.
- Lophocolea widgrenii Steph.
- Lophocolea zuernii Stephani
