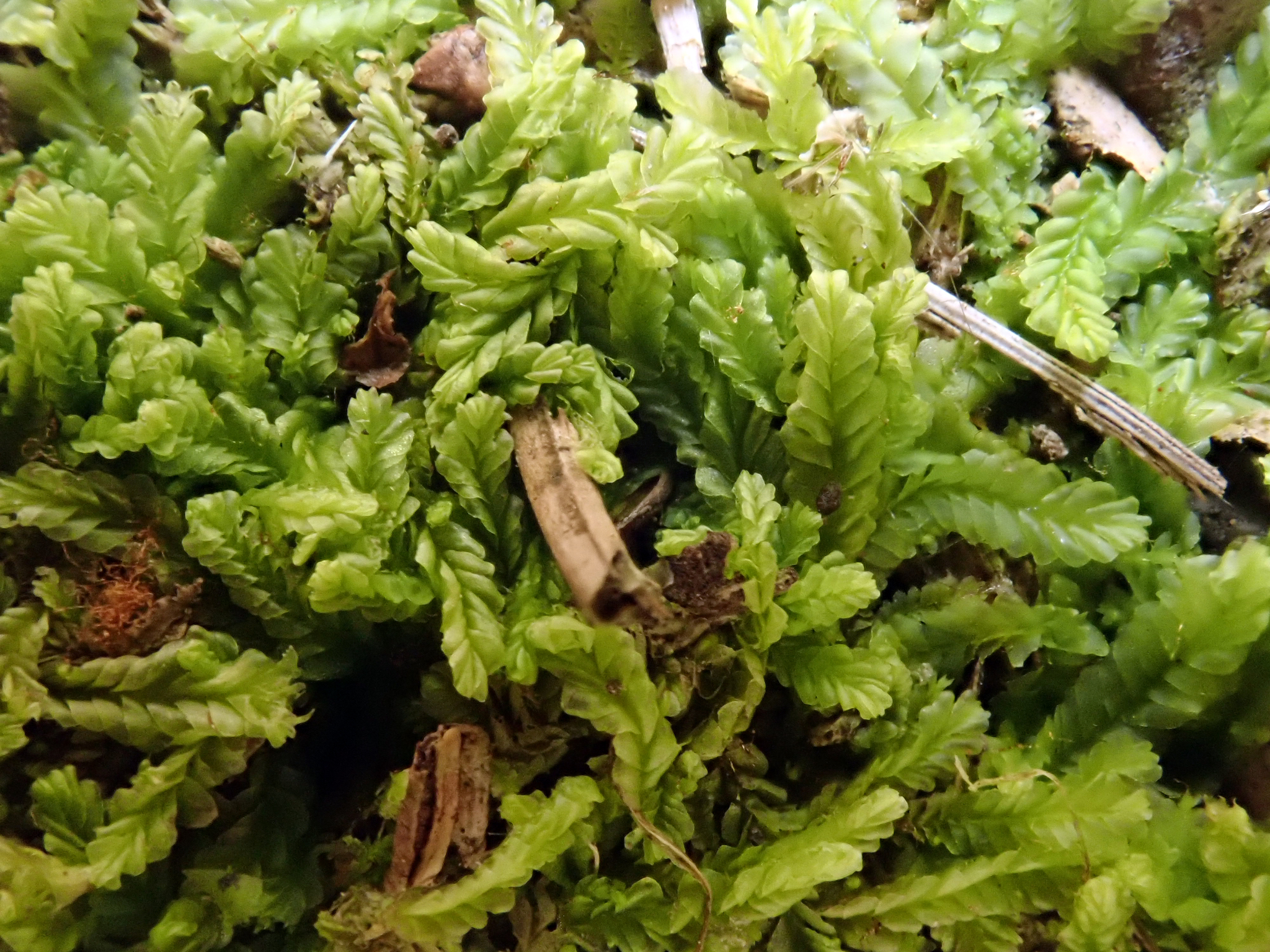

Scientific classification
- Kingdom: Plantae
- Division: Marchantiophyta
- Class: Jungermanniopsida
- Order: Lepidoziales
- Family: Lophocoleaceae
- Genus: Lophocolea
- Species: L. semiteres

Binomial name
- Lophocolea semiteres (Lehm.) Mitt.

Synonyms
- Chiloscyphus semiteres (Lehm.) Lehm. & Lindenb.; Jungermannia semiteres Lehm.

= Lophocolea semiteres =

Species of plant

Lophocolea semiteres, sometimes known as the southern crestwort, is a species of liverwort native to Australia, New Zealand, South Africa, South America, and a number of sub-Antarctic Islands.

== Description ==
Lophocolea semiteres, being a bryophyte, is a small, non-vascular plant that has a prostrate growth habit, creeping across its substrate. The plants are yellowish in colour and have rounded lateral leaves with mostly entire margins, but these become progressively emarginate to distinctly bi-lobed nearing terminal archegonia, which are surrounded by a leafy perianth. Male plants are more common and highly distinctive. Antheridia are borne intercalary on shoots, protected by modified saccate leaves.

== Range ==
The native range of Lophocolea semiteres is pan-south-temperate. In New Zealand, it is found on the main North, South, and Stewart Islands, as well as the offshore Campbell, Chatham, and Kermadec Islands. It grows in all states and territories of Australia, other than the Northern Territory and Queensland. The type locality of the species is Teufelsberg, in southern Africa. L. semiteres also occurs in southern South America and southern temperate oceanic islands. It has been introduced to Europe and the British Isles and is there considered an invasive species.

== Habitat & Ecology ==
As Lophocolea semiteres is a xeric-tolerant species of liverwort, it is one of the most widespread and common members of the Lophocoleaceae, if not the Jungermaniineae, particularly in Australia. It may be found growing on soil, mortar, in lawns and gardens, but also in moist indigenous forests. In its introduced range it grows generally on earthy or sandy banks.

== Etymology ==
The specific epithet refers to a shape - 'semiterete', meaning half-cylindrical. This may refer to the shape of plant shoots, but was not recorded in the species protologue.

== Taxonomy ==
Lophocolea semiteres was first described from South Africa (now Namibia) in 1829 as Jungermannia semiteres. While included in Chiloscyphus as C. semiteres by some authors, others prefer to segregate the genera. L. semiteres contains the following varieties:

- Lophocholea semiteres var. semiteres
- Lophocolea semiteres var. retusa
