= Sphagnum falcatulum =

Scientific classification
- Kingdom: Plantae
- Division: Bryophyta
- Class: Sphagnopsida
- Order: Sphagnales
- Family: Sphagnaceae
- Genus: Sphagnum
- Species: S. falcatulum

Binomial name
- Sphagnum falcatulum Besch.

Species of moss

Sphagnum falcatulum is a species of peat moss. It occurs in Australia where it has been recorded from New South Wales, Victoria and Tasmania, including subantarctic Macquarie Island, as well as from New Zealand and South America. It occurs in wetlands from near sea level to subalpine sites, often in water where the plants have a feathery appearance.
