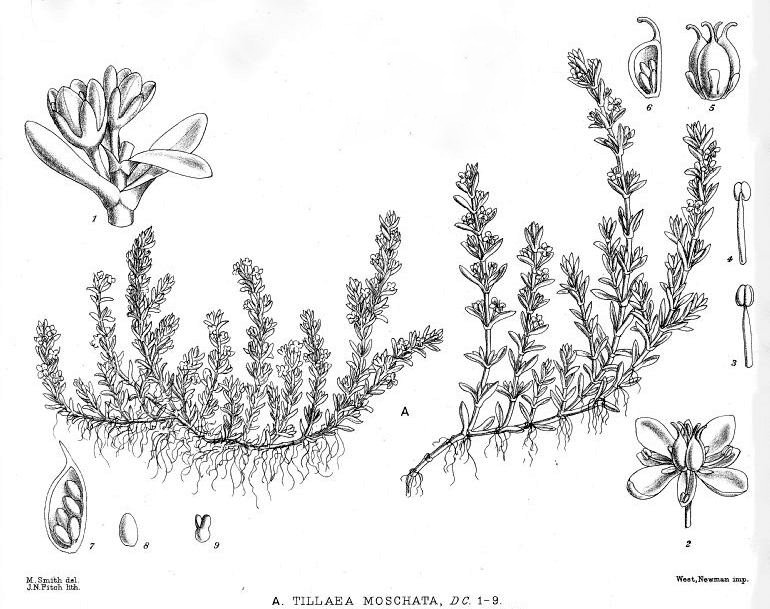

Scientific classification
- Kingdom: Plantae
- Clade: Tracheophytes
- Clade: Angiosperms
- Clade: Eudicots
- Order: Saxifragales
- Family: Crassulaceae
- Genus: Crassula
- Species: C. moschata

Binomial name
- Crassula moschata G.Forst. (1787)

= Crassula moschata =

Musky stonecrop

Species of succulent

Crassula moschata, commonly known as the Shore Stonecrop, Musky Stonecrop, or Musky Crassula, is a hairless, mat-forming, succulent, perennial herb. It is widespread on the subantarctic and cool temperate shores of the Southern Ocean.

== Description ==
The main stems grow along the ground, rooting at the nodes. The lateral stems are erect. The small spoon to lance-shaped leaves are reddish at the base with the upper leaves concave and the lower convex; they are 2.8–4.2 mm long and 1.1–1.5 mm wide. The single flowers appear in the axils of the upper leaves; they appear from January to March: they have pink sepals and white petals about 2.5 mm long. The fruits have four seeds, each about 0.8 mm long and roughly oval in shape.

== Distribution and habitat ==
The species has a circumpolar range in subantarctic latitudes where it is found in southern South America, Tasmania, New Zealand and many subantarctic islands. It occurs in the littoral zone on beachrock stacks, on humic sandy soils on rocky shores, and on thin peaty soil on beach pebbles.
