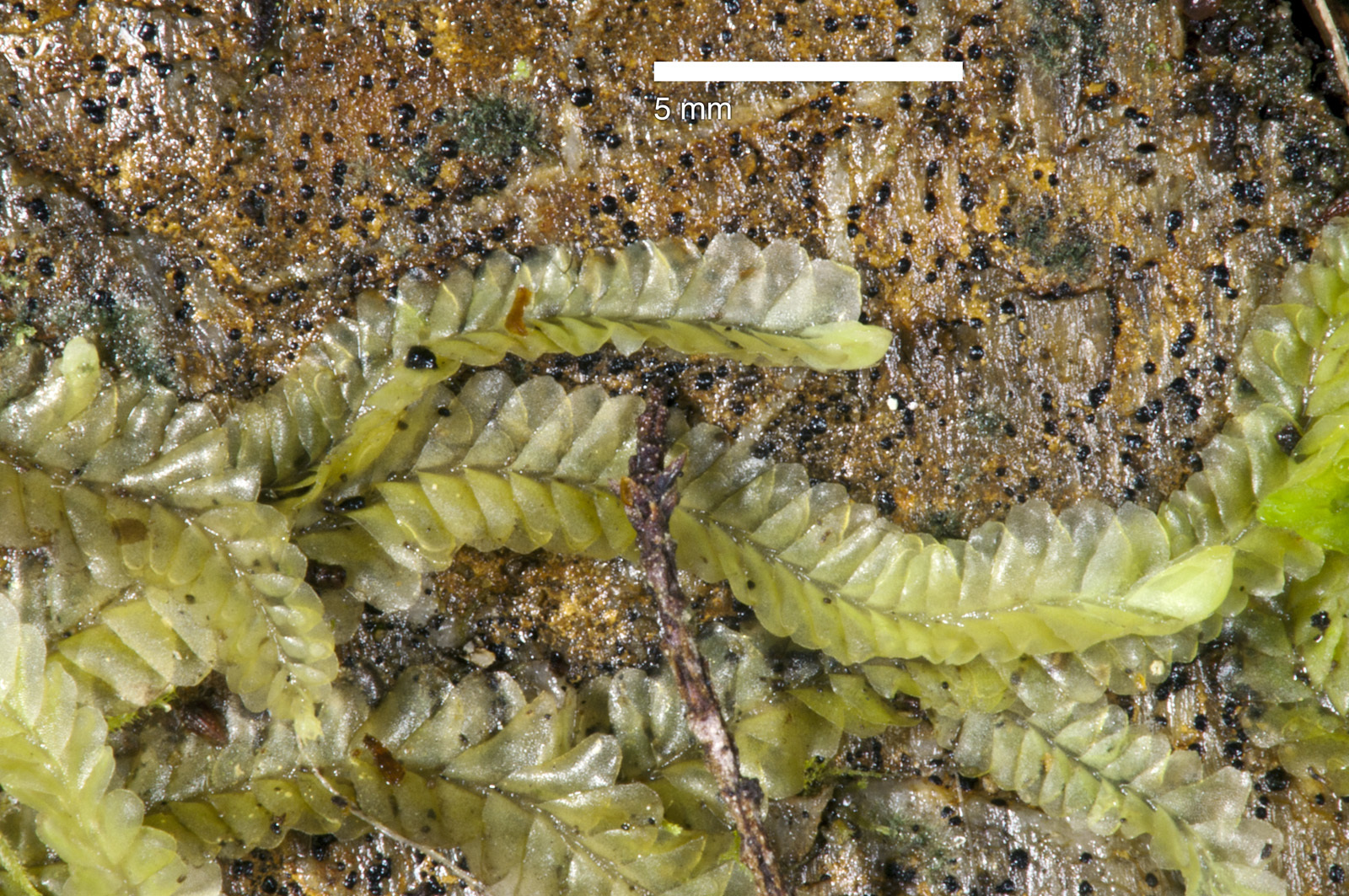
- Leptoscyphus normalis

Scientific classification
- Kingdom: Plantae
- Division: Marchantiophyta
- Class: Jungermanniopsida
- Order: Lepidoziales
- Family: Lophocoleaceae
- Genus: Leptoscyphus; Mitt.

Synonyms
- Leioscyphus Mitt.; Physotheca J.J.Engel & Gradst.

= Leptoscyphus =

Genus of liverworts

Leptoscyphus is a genus of liverwort in the family Lophocoleaceae.

It has an almost cosmopolitan distribution, except central mainland Europe, most parts of Asia and parts of north America where it is not found.

== Species ==
As accepted by GBIF;

- Leptoscyphus abditus (Sull.) Dugas
- Leptoscyphus aequatus (Hook.f. & Taylor) Mitt.
- Leptoscyphus amphibolius (Nees) Grolle
- Leptoscyphus antarcticus (C.Massal.) Solari
- Leptoscyphus australis (Gottsche, Lindenb. & Nees) R.M.Schust.
- Leptoscyphus autoicus (J.J.Engel & Gradst.) Vanderp. & Gradst.
- Leptoscyphus beckettianus (Steph.) R.M.Schust. ex J.J.Engel
- Leptoscyphus belmoranus (Stephani) J.J.Engel
- Leptoscyphus chilensis (De Not.) Hässel
- Leptoscyphus cleefii Fulford
- Leptoscyphus compactus (Colenso) J.J.Engel
- Leptoscyphus cuneifolius (Hook.) Mitt.
- Leptoscyphus difficilis (Steph.) Fulford
- Leptoscyphus diversifolius (Gottsche) Grolle
- Leptoscyphus excipulatus (Steph.) J.J.Engel
- Leptoscyphus expansus (Lehm.) Grolle
- Leptoscyphus gibbosus (Taylor) Mitt.
- Leptoscyphus gradsteinii Vanderp., Schäf.-Verw. & D.G.Long
- Leptoscyphus hatcheri Fulford
- Leptoscyphus hedbergii (S.W.Arnell) R.M.Schust.
- Leptoscyphus heterophyllus (Steph.) J.J.Engel
- Leptoscyphus hexagonus (Nees) Grolle
- Leptoscyphus horizontalis (Hook.) Kühnem.
- Leptoscyphus huidobroanus (Mont.) Gottsche
- Leptoscyphus huonicus Piippo
- Leptoscyphus idiodontus J.J.Engel
- Leptoscyphus incomptus J.J.Engel
- Leptoscyphus infuscatus (Mitt.) E.W.Jones ex Grolle
- Leptoscyphus intermedius Grolle
- Leptoscyphus iversenii (Pearson) Sim
- Leptoscyphus jackii (Steph.) Grolle
- Leptoscyphus lambinonii Vanderp., Schäf.-Verw. & D.G.Long
- Leptoscyphus leoniae Gradst.
- Leptoscyphus longistipulus (Stephani) J.J.Engel
- Leptoscyphus magellanicus (Gola) Hässel
- Leptoscyphus microphyllidicus J.J.Engel
- Leptoscyphus monoicus Solari
- Leptoscyphus nanophysanthodes J.J.Engel
- Leptoscyphus normalis (Steph.) J.J.Engel
- Leptoscyphus obcordatus (Spruce) Grolle
- Leptoscyphus ovatus (Spruce) Grolle
- Leptoscyphus patagonicus (Stephani) Grolle
- Leptoscyphus physanthus (Hook.f. & Taylor) J.J.Engel
- Leptoscyphus physocalyx (Hampe & Gottsche) Gottsche
- Leptoscyphus porphyrius (Nees) Grolle
- Leptoscyphus sotiauxii Vanderp., Schäf.-Verw. & D.G.Long
- Leptoscyphus spectabilis (Steph.) Grolle
- Leptoscyphus trapezoïdes (Mont.) L.Söderstr.
