= Pachyglossa (plant) =

Scientific classification
- Kingdom: Plantae
- Division: Marchantiophyta
- Class: Jungermanniopsida
- Order: Lepidoziales
- Family: Lophocoleaceae
- Genus: Pachyglossa; Herzog & Grolle

Genus of liverworts

Pachyglossa is a genus of liverworts in the family Lophocoleaceae.

== Species ==
There are five species in the genus:

- Pachyglossa gottscheoides (Besch. & C.Massal.) L.Söderstr.
- Pachyglossa grolleana Váňa
- Pachyglossa dissitifolia Herzog & Grolle
- Pachyglossa spegazziniana (C.Massal.) Herzog & Grolle
- Pachyglossa tenacifolia (Hook.f. & Taylor) Herzog & Grolle

== Distribution ==
Pachyglossa is the largest genus of liverworts in Antarctica, with three species. The remainder are sub-Antarctic in range, with one species (Pachyglossa tenacifolia) endemic to New Zealand.

== Etymology ==
The genus is named for its thick leaves, unusual in being two cells thick.
