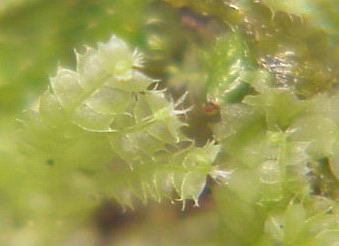

Scientific classification
- Kingdom: Plantae
- Division: Marchantiophyta
- Class: Jungermanniopsida
- Order: Lepidoziales
- Family: Lophocoleaceae
- Genus: Lophocolea
- Species: L. bidentata

Binomial name
- Lophocolea bidentata (L.) Dumort.

= Lophocolea bidentata =

Species of liverwort

Lophocolea bidentata is a species of liverwort belonging to the family Lophocoleaceae.

A study in tropical Ecuador found that Lophocolea bidentata was typically not found in urban environments despite being found in a nearby pristine location, suggesting that the species is sensitive to anthropogenic effects such as the presence of wastewater and heavy metal pollution.
