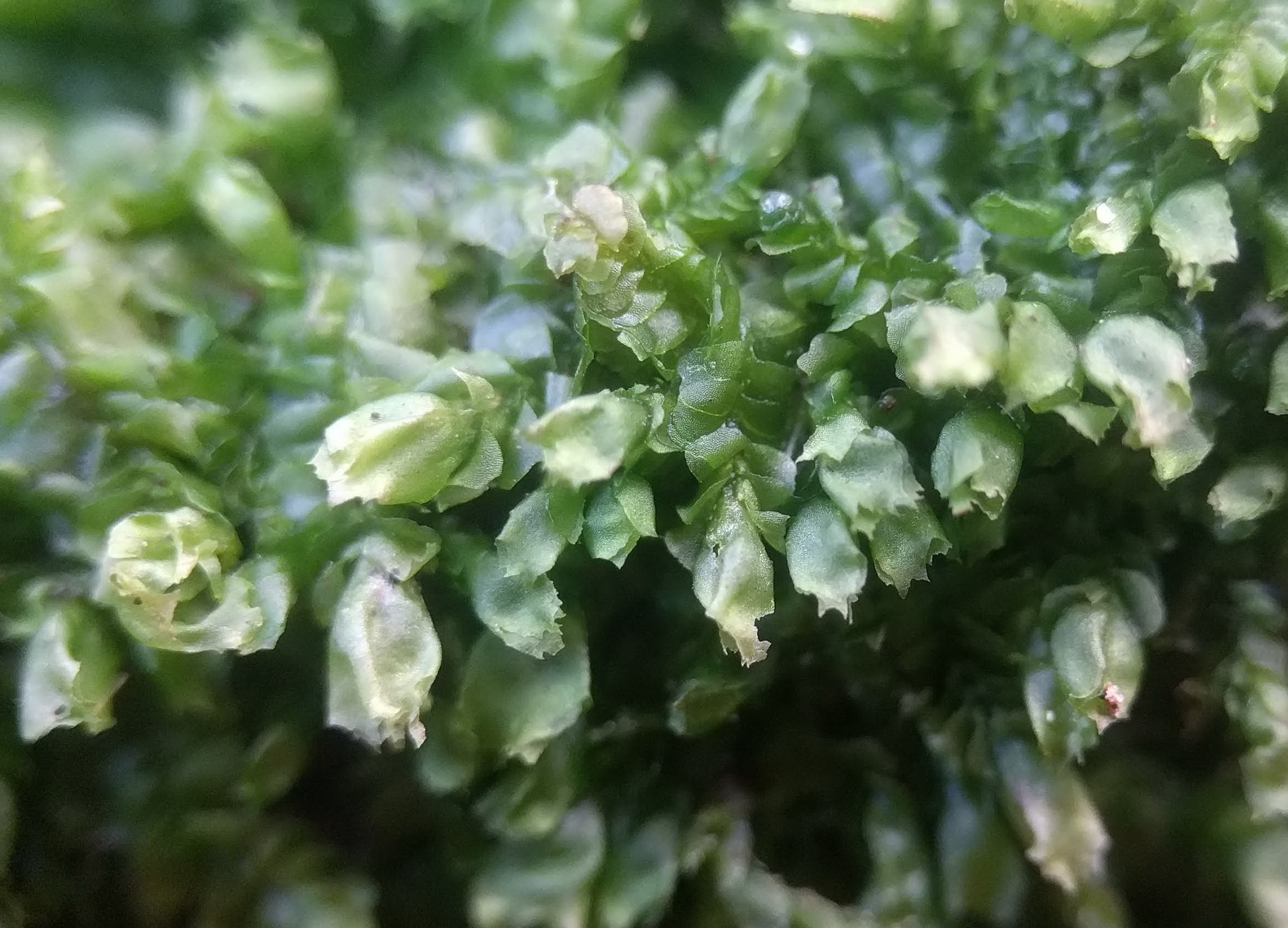
- Lophocolea heterophylla

Scientific classification
- Kingdom: Plantae
- Division: Marchantiophyta
- Class: Jungermanniopsida
- Order: Lepidoziales
- Family: Lophocoleaceae; Vanden Berghen

= Lophocoleaceae =

Family of plants

Lophocoleaceae is a family of liverworts previously treated within the order Jungermanniales, but currently placed in the Lophoziales based on more comprehensive molecular evidence.

== Description ==
Plants in the Lophocoleaceae are usually distinctly anisophyllous, in liverworts indicating that the lateral leaves differ significantly in size and/or shape from the underleaves, mostly grow prostrate (i.e. parallel to their substrate), and tend to inhabit terrestrial micro-habitats, such as rocks or soil banks, though are sometimes found as epiphytes or aquatic. Most taxa are dioicous; female plants bear leafy perianths that can be terminal on long shoots or borne on short intercalary branches, while antheridia are either held in basal sacs of modified lateral leaves along primary shoots or in some taxa (e.g. Heteroscyphus, Leptoscyphus) can be on highly reduced branches that extend barely beyond lateral leaves.

== Genera ==
Genera:

- Bragginsella R.M.Schust.
- Chiloscyphus Corda
- Clasmatocolea Spruce
- Conoscyphus Mitt.
- Cryptolophocolea L.Söderstr., Crand.-Stotl., Stotler & Vána
- Deceptifrons J.J.Engel & Vána
- Evansianthus R.M.Schust. & J.J.Engel
- Hepatostolonophora J.J.Engel & R.M.Schust.
- Heteroscyphus Schiffn.
- Lamellocolea J.J.Engel
- Leptophyllopsis R.M.Schust.
- Leptoscyphopsis R.M.Schust.
- Leptoscyphus Mitt.
- Lophocolea (Dumort.) Dumort.
- Otoscyphus J.J.Engel, Bardat & Thouvenot
- Pachyglossa Herzog & Grolle
- Perdusenia Hässel
- Pigafettoa C.Massal.
- Platycaulis R.M.Schust.
- Stolonivector J.J.Engel
- Xenocephalozia R.M.Schust.
