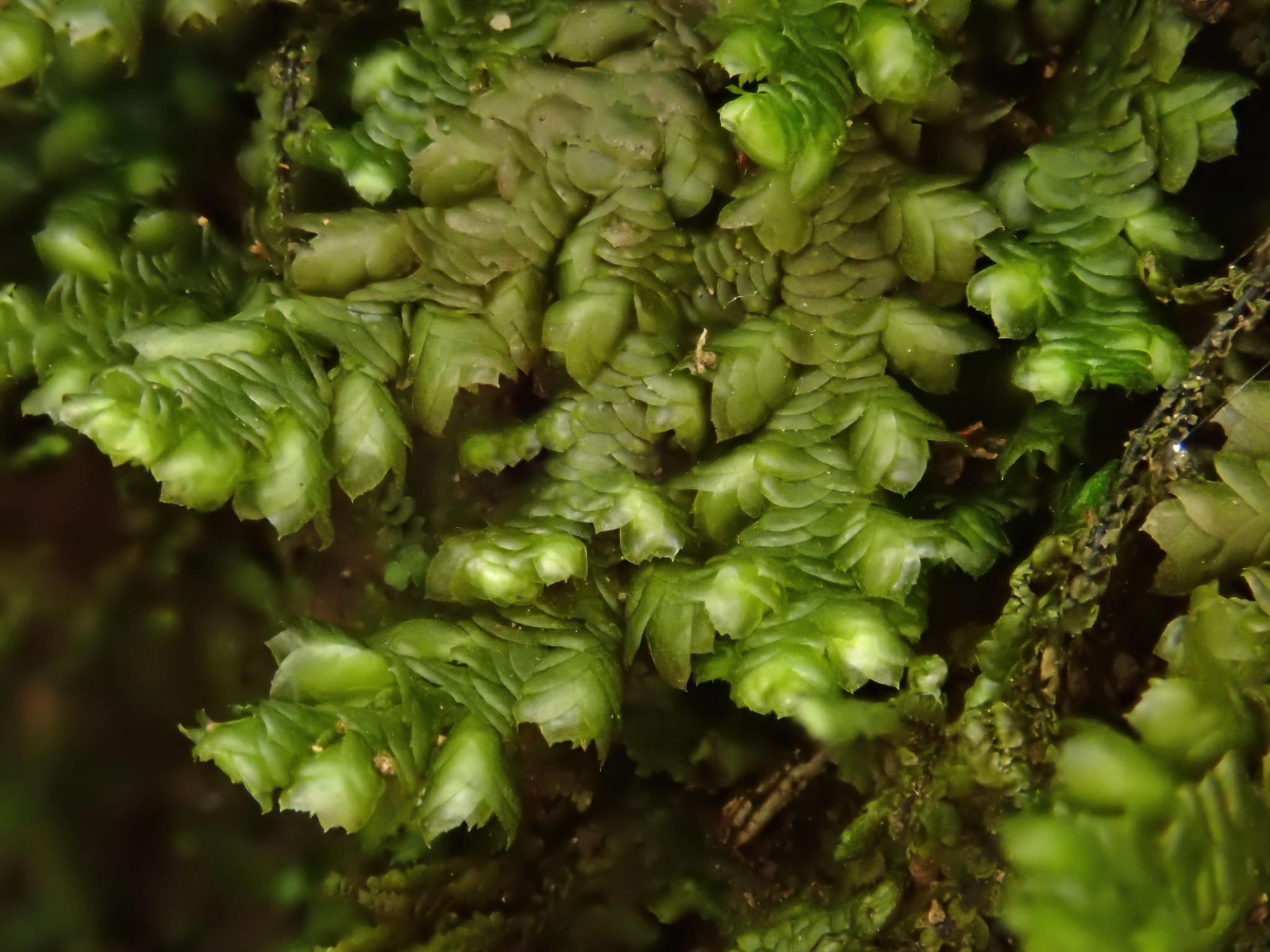
- On Tenerife

Conservation status
- Vulnerable (IUCN 3.1)

Scientific classification
- Kingdom: Plantae
- Division: Marchantiophyta
- Class: Jungermanniopsida
- Order: Frullaniales
- Family: Frullaniaceae
- Genus: Frullania
- Species: F. polysticta

Binomial name
- Frullania polysticta Gottsche, Lindenb. & Nees

Synonyms
- Frullania bryhnii Müll.Frib.

= Frullania polysticta =

Species of liverwort

Frullania polysticta is a species of liverwort in the family Frullaniaceae. It is found only in Madeira and the Canary Islands and is considered a vulnerable species.

== Distribution and habitat ==
Frullania polysticta can be found on all islands of both the Madeira and Canary Islands archipelagos. It is widely distributed across Madeira and is similarly frequent on most of the Canary Islands, though it is rarer on Fuerteventura and Lanzarote. It occurs primarily in laurel forests at elevations of 500–1,200 m (1,600–3,900 ft) above sea level, occurring most frequently above 800 m (2,600 ft). It typically grows as an epiphyte on the bark of trees, but can also be found on shaded rocks and humid soil amongst leaf litter.

It has been recorded from the Azores, however, these identifications were later determined to be erroneous.

== Description ==
Frullania polysticta is a robust, irregularly branched, mat-forming liverwort that is light green to reddish brown in colour. The shoots measure 5–8 cm (2.0–3.1 in) long and 1,400–2,200 μm (1.4–2.2 mm) wide. The overlapping leaves are borne on stems measuring 120–220 μm (0.12–0.22 mm) in diameter. F. polysticta is dioecious, with male and female plants being of similar size.

== Ecology ==
Frullania polysticta can be considered a laurel forest habitat specialist. Known host tree species include Erica arborea, Ilex canariensis, Laurus azorica, Laurus novocanariensis, Ocotea foetens, and Picconia excelsa. It has been recorded growing in association with other bryophytes, including Dicranum scottianum, Frullania dilatata, Frullania azorica, Frullania teneriffae, Kurzia trichoclados, Leucodon canariensis, Metzgeria consanguinea, Metzgeria furcata, Plagiochila bifaria, Radula lindenbergiana, Saccogyna viticulosa, and Sematophyllum substrumulosum, and in association with lichens such as Anaptychia ciliaris, Degelia plumbea, Lobaria pulmonaria, and Leptogium species.

Frullania polysticta is a long-lived perennial species with an estimated generation length of 11 to 25 years. It is the only known host of Octosporella microtricha, a species of parasitic fungus.

== Conservation status ==
Frullania polysticta is listed as vulnerable on the International Union for the Conservation of Nature's Red List under criterion A3c, based on its decreasing population and observed habitat loss. It is threatened by urbanization, tourism, overgrazing, and climate change. No specific conservation measures are in place to protect this species, however, it is known to occur within protected areas such as Madeira Natural Park.
