= Erioderma borbonicum =

Scientific classification
- Kingdom: Fungi
- Division: Ascomycota
- Class: Lecanoromycetes
- Order: Peltigerales
- Family: Pannariaceae
- Genus: Erioderma
- Species: E. borbonicum

Binomial name
- Erioderma borbonicum P.M.Jørg. & van den Boom (2009)

Species of lichen

Erioderma borbonicum is a little-known species of corticolous (bark-dwelling), foliose lichen in the family Pannariaceae. It is endemic to Réunion, an island in the Indian Ocean. The lichen forms a dense, cushion-like thallus with a diameter of 3 to 4 cm, with flat, slightly overlapping lobes with a grey-brown upper surface and cream-coloured underside.

== Taxonomy ==
The lichen was formally described as a new species in 2009 by the lichenologists Per Magnus Jørgensen and Pieter P.G. van den Boom. The type specimen was collected from the northwest side of Forêt de Bébour, specifically along the trail leading from Gîte de Bélouve. The collection site was about 3.5 km (2.2 mi) southwest towards Caverne Mussard, at an elevation of 1,980 m (6,500 ft) above sea level.

== Description ==
Erioderma borbonicum forms a dense, cushion-like structure, typically spanning 3 to 4 cm in diameter. It has flat lobes that are slightly overlapping, each measuring up to 3 mm in width with wavy edges. Some of these lobes tend to curl upwards, especially when dry, revealing the cream-coloured underside of the lichen. The upper surface has a grey-brown colour and is covered in clusters of simple, soft, and colourless hairs.

When examined in a cross-section, Erioderma borbonicum is about 200 to 250 μm thick. It has a well-structured upper cortex (the outer layer of the lichen) that is about 60 μm thick. The inner layer, known as the medulla, is densely packed with vertical chains of Scytonema, a type of cyanobacteria, with individual cells roughly 10 μm in diameter. This lichen lacks a lower cortex.

The reproductive structures, or apothecia, are located along the edges or just inside the margins. These are short-stalked, brownish-black in colour with a paler, sometimes downy, edge (exciple), and measure between 1 and 2 mm in diameter. The supporting structure beneath the spore-producing layer (hymenium), called the subhymenium, is brown and consists of densely interwoven hyphae measuring 60 to 80 μm wide. The hymenium itself is 100 to 120 μm high and colourless, although it turns darkly pigmented at the top. When stained with iodine, it consistently shows a blue reaction.

The asci, or spore-producing cells, are cylindrical with internal amyloid structures at the tip and contain eight spores each. The spores are colourless, nearly spherical, and measure 9 to 12 by 8 to 9 μm. Additionally, marginal pycnidia (conidia-producing structures) are present, appearing as brownish-black, wart-like formations up to 200 μm in diameter. These pycnidia produce rod-shaped conidia, measuring 2 to 4 by 1 to 1.5 μm.

Chemically, Erioderma borbonicum is Pd+ (orange). This chemical spot test indicates the presence of argopsin as the major chemical component, along with a smaller amount of norargopsin. There are no traces of eriodermanons detected through thin-layer chromatography in this species.

== Habitat and distribution ==
The habitat and distribution of this species are quite specific and limited. It has only been observed once, growing on a Philippia shrub in a relatively sunlight-exposed area. This observation suggests that the species is more tolerant to light compared to E. gloriosum. The lichen was found in a community with several lichen species, including E. sorediatum, Hypotrachyna sinuosa, Megalospora tuberculosa, Normandina pulchella, and species from the genera Anzia, Coccocarpia, Fissurina, Lecidella, Leiorreuma, Menegazzia, Micarea, and Sticta.
