= Frullania asagrayana =

Scientific classification
- Kingdom: Plantae
- Division: Marchantiophyta
- Class: Jungermanniopsida
- Order: Frullaniales
- Family: Frullaniaceae
- Genus: Frullania
- Species: F. asagrayana

Binomial name
- Frullania asagrayana Montagne

Species of liverwort

Frullania asagrayana is a reddish-brown species of liverwort in the family Frullaniaceae that grows in eastern North America.

== Taxonomy and naming ==
Frullania asagrayana was first described in 1842 by Camille Montagne, a French bryologist and mycologist, and named after the American botanist Asa Gray. It remained a species under that name until 1966, when Japanese bryologist Shinji Hattori combined F. asagrayana and three other species of Frullania and made them all subspecies of Frullania tamarisci. These four species looked similar, but lived in different parts of the world. They were F. tamarisci from Europe, F. asagrayana from eastern North America, F. nisquallensis from the northern Pacific coast of North America and Siberia, and F. moniliata from India and Southeast Asia. Frullania asagrayana was then called Frullania tamarisci ssp. asagrayana until 1987, when an international research team at Southern Illinois University used a variety of morphological, chemical, and genetic markers to determine that the four subspecies of Frullania tamarisci were in fact separate species.

== Description and ecology ==
Frullania asagrayana is reddish-brown in colour, and grows closely attached to its substrate. It has leaves that are divided into two lobes, with the lower lobe being a smaller, sac-shaped structure attached to the base of the upper lobe by a narrow constriction. This structure can fill with water, and may serve as a mechanism for prolonged water storage.

== Symbiosis and ecological associations ==
The endangered lichen Erioderma pedicellatum, which is a symbiosis between an ascomycete fungus and a cyanobacterium, seems to only be able to grow in association with Frullania asagrayana. It has been suggested that the water sacs of F. asagrayana may host the cyanobacterium Scytonema, and that the symbiosis between this cyanobacterium and the germinating fungal spores of Erioderma pedicellatum can only begin within these water sacs, where the fungal hyphae assimilate a cyanobacterium, and needs to develop for 5 to 10 years before it reaches a visible size. F. asagrayana may also benefit from the nitrogen that is being fixed by the cyanolichen growing within it. Frullania tamarisci, a closely related species that is found in the United Kingdom is often found with apothecia of the ascomycete fungi Filicupula suboperculata growing on it.

== Conservation status ==
Frullania asagrayana has a conservation status of "sensitive" in Ontario, Canada, and it may be essential for the growth of the lichen Erioderma pedicellatum, which is listed as critically endangered by the International Union for Conservation of Nature.

== Gallery ==
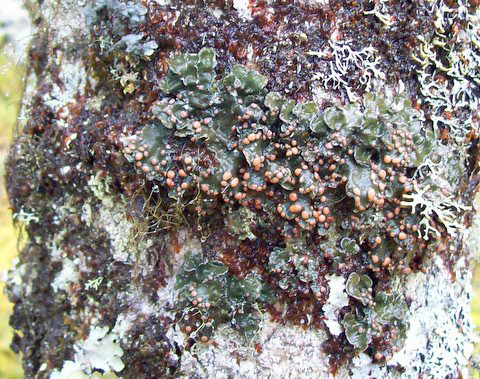
Reddish liverwort Frullania asagrayana on a tree in Newfoundland, with the lichen Erioderma pedicellatum growing on top of it.

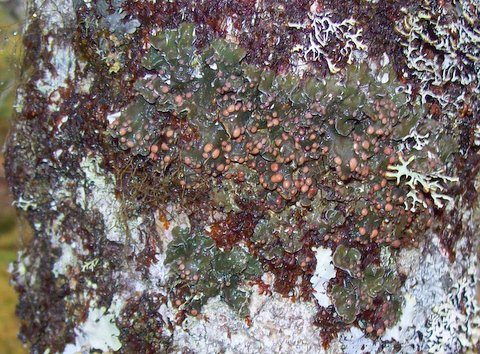
Reddish liverwort Frullania asagrayana on a tree in Newfoundland, with the lichen Erioderma pedicellatum growing on top of it.

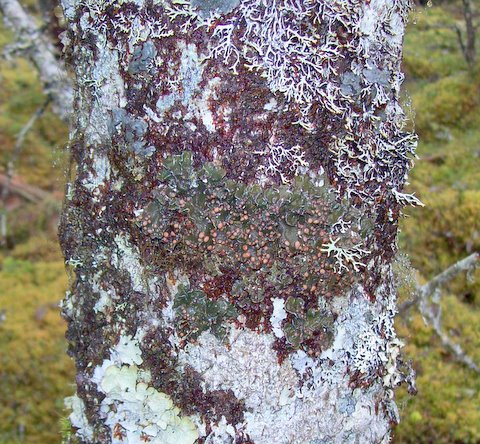
Reddish liverwort Frullania asagrayana on a tree in Newfoundland, with the lichen Erioderma pedicellatum growing on top of it.
