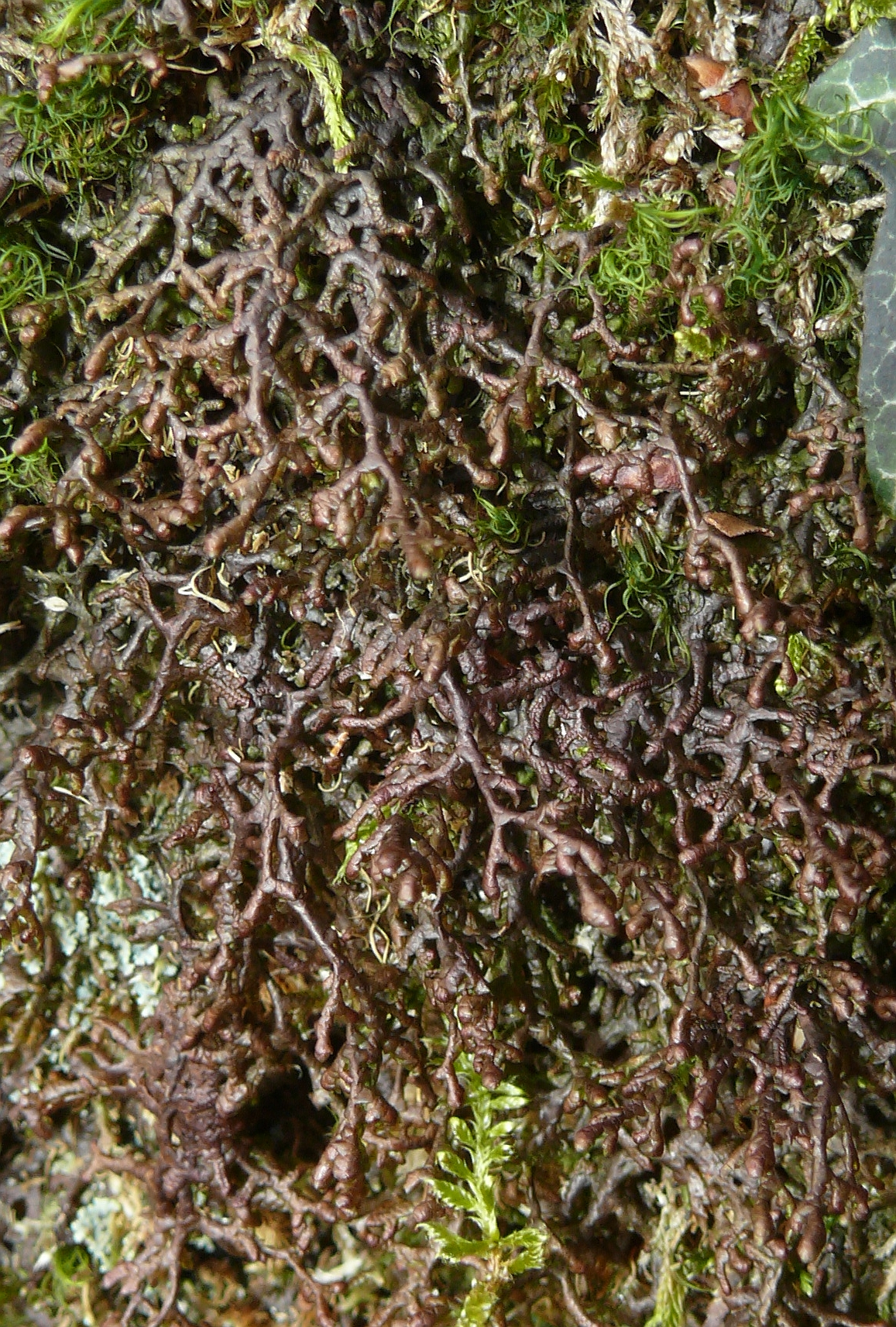
- Frullania tamarisci

Scientific classification
- Kingdom: Plantae
- Division: Marchantiophyta
- Class: Jungermanniopsida
- Order: Frullaniales
- Family: Frullaniaceae; Lorch
- Genus: Frullania; Raddi

Species
- See text

= Frullania =

Frullania Temporal range: Cenomanian–Present

Genus of liverworts

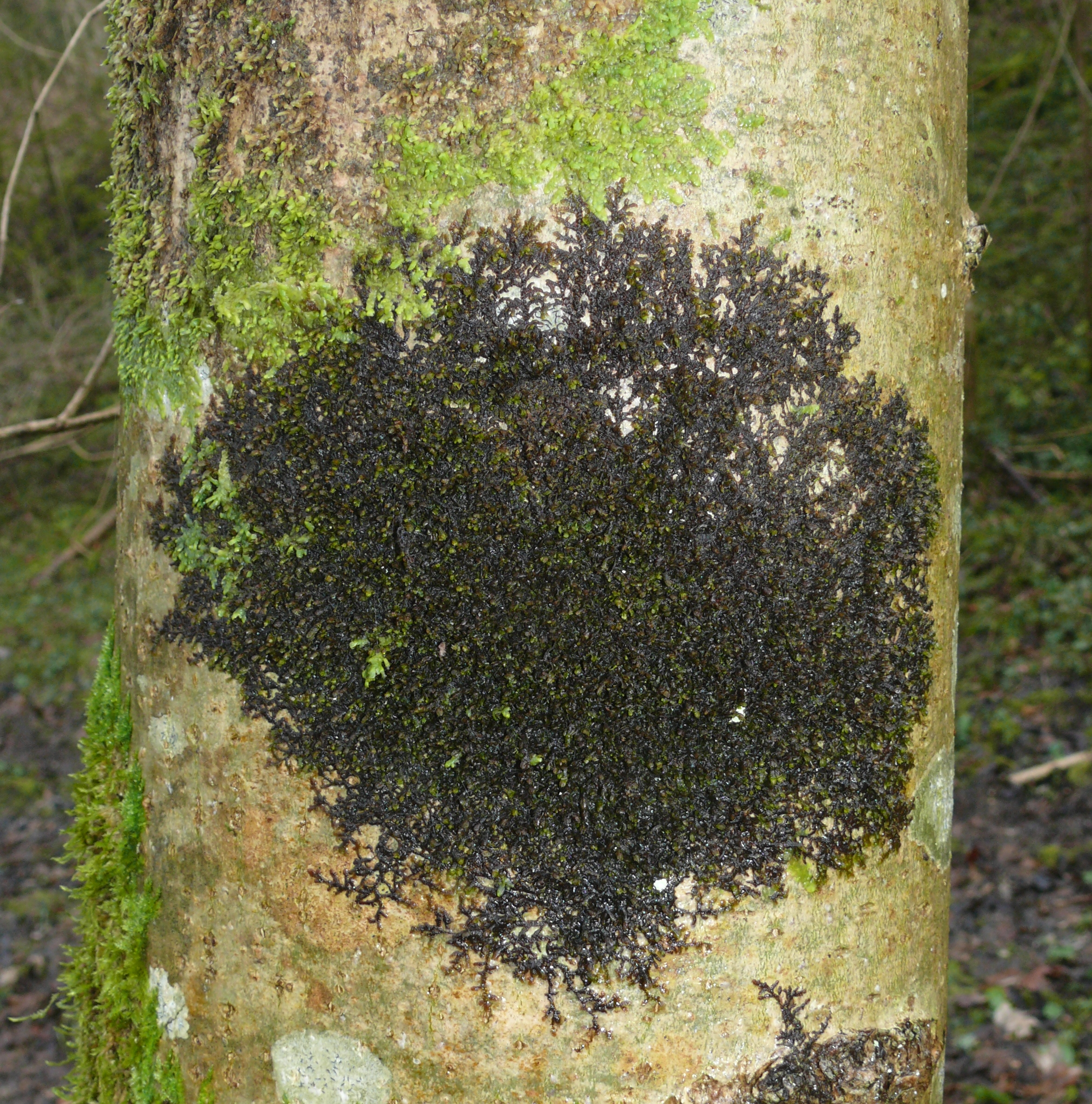
Frullania dilatata

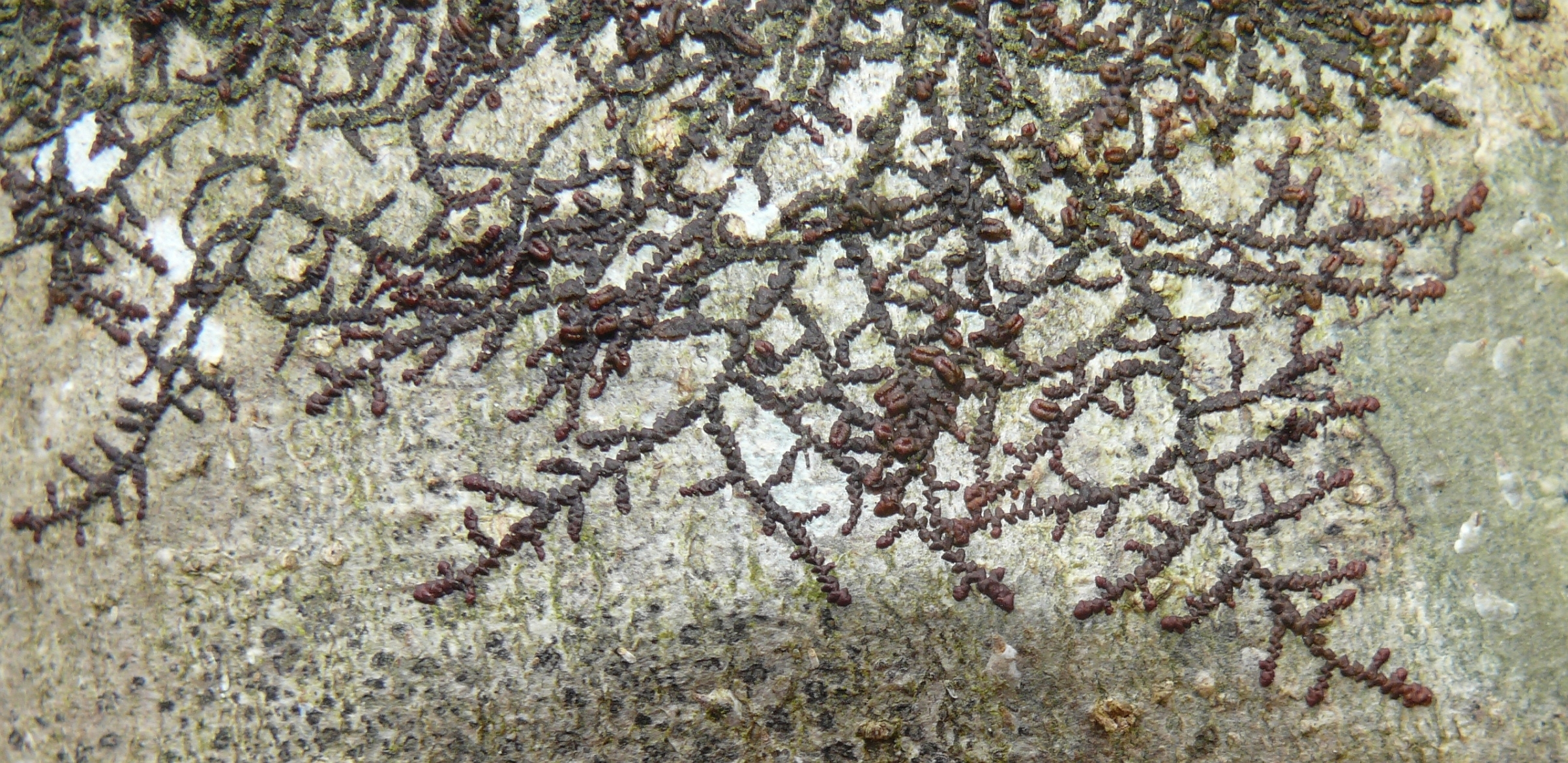
Frullania fragilifolia

Frullania is the only genus of liverworts in family Frullaniaceae. It contains the following species:

A

- Frullania aculeata Taylor, 1846
- Frullania acutata Caspary, 1887
- Frullania acutiloba Gerola, 1947
- Frullania akiyamae Hattori, 1986
- Frullania albertii Stephani, 1916
- Frullania allanii Hodgson, 1949
- Frullania allionii Stephani, 1910
- Frullania alpina Stephani, 1911
- Frullania alstonii Verdoorn, 1930
- Frullania alstonii var. pfleidereri Hattori, 1972
- Frullania alternans Nees In G., L. & N., 1845
- Frullania amamiensis Kamimura, 1968
- Frullania ambronnii Stephani, 1916
- Frullania amplicrania Stephani, 1910
- Frullania ampullifera Jack & Stephani In Stephani, 1894
- Frullania anderssonii Ångström, 1873
- Frullania angulata Mitten, 1863
- Frullania angulata F. Serratoides Vanden Berghen, 1983
- Frullania angulata var. laciniata Demaret & Vanden Berghen, 1950
- Frullania angustistipa Stephani, 1908
- Frullania anomala Hodgson, 1949
- Frullania antaresensis Hattori, 1980
- Frullania aoshimensis Horikawa, 1929
- Frullania apertilobula Gerola, 1947
- Frullania apicalis Mitten, 1879
- Frullania apicalis var. camerunensis Vanden Berghen, 1976
- Frullania apiculata (R., B. & N.) Nees In G., L. & N., 1845
- Frullania apiculata var. goebelii Schiffner, 1893
- Frullania apiculata var. guianensis Lindenberg & Gottsche, 1851
- Frullania apiculata var. laxa Nees In G., L. & N., 1845
- Frullania apollinarii Stephani, 1911
- Frullania aposinensis Hattori & Lin, 1985
- Frullania appalachiana Schuster, 1983
- Frullania appendistipula Hattori, 1972
- Frullania appendistipula var. spinifera Hattori, 1974
- Frullania arecae (Sprengel) Gottsche, 1863
- Frullania arecae var. spiniloba (Stephani) Yuzawa, 1991
- Frullania armata Herzog & Clark In Clark, 1954
- Frullania armatifolia Verdoorn, 1932
- Frullania armitiana Stephani, 1911
- Frullania armitiana var. inflexula Hattori, 1988
- Frullania armitiana var. longe-Attenuata (Hattori) Hattori, 1980
- Frullania arsenii Stephani, 1924
- Frullania asagrayana Montagne, 1842
- Frullania astrolabea Stephani, 1910
- Frullania aterrima (Hooker & Taylor) Hooker & Taylor In G., L. & N., 1845
- Frullania aterrima var. lepida Hodgson, 1949
- Frullania atrata (Swartz) Montagne, 1839
- Frullania atrata var. flaccida (Weber) Nees In G., L. & N., 1845
- Frullania atrata var. mexicana Nees In G., L. & N., 1845
- Frullania atrosanguinea Taylor Ex Spruce, 1884
- Frullania attenuata Stephani, 1911
- Frullania auriculata Hattori, 1985
- Frullania azorica Sim-Sim, Sergio, Mues & Kraut, 1995

B

- Frullania baileyana Stephani, 1910
- Frullania bakeri Stephani, 1916
- Frullania baladina Gottsche Ex Stephani, 1894
- Frullania baladina var. edentata Hattori, 1984
- Frullania baltica Grolle, 1985
- Frullania baumannii Hattori, 1977
- Frullania beauverdii Stephani, 1916
- Frullania bella Stephani, 1911
- Frullania belmorensis Stephani In Stephani & Watts, 1914
- Frullania benjaminiana Inoue In Hattori, 1975
- Frullania bergmanii Hattori, 1974
- Frullania berthoumieui Stephani, 1894
- Frullania beyrichiana (Lehmann & Lindenberg In Lehmann) Lehmann & Lindenberg In G., L. & N., 1845
- Frullania bhutanensis Hattori, 1971
- Frullania bicornistipula Spruce, 1884
- Frullania blastopetala Hattori, 1984
- Frullania blepharozia Spruce, 1884
- Frullania bogotensis Stephani, 1910
- Frullania bolanderi Austin, 1869
- Frullania bonariensis Reiner, 1988
- Frullania bonincola Hattori, 1978
- Frullania borbonica Lindenberg In G., L. & N., 1845
- Frullania boveana Massalongo, 1885
- Frullania brachycarpa Spruce, 1889
- Frullania brasiliensis Raddi, 1822
- Frullania brasiliensis var. cylindrica (Gottsche In Lehmann) Spruce, 1884
- Frullania brasiliensis var. cylindrica F. Lindigii (Gottsche) Spruce, 1884
- Frullania breuteliana Gottsche In G., L. & N., 1845
- Frullania brevicalycina Stephani, 1894
- Frullania brittoniae Evans, 1897
- Frullania brotheri Stephani, 1894
- Frullania brunnea (Sprengel) Drège, 1843
- Frullania buchtienii Herzog, 1942
- Frullania bullata Stephani, 1910

C

- Frullania caduca Hattori, 1980
- Frullania caespitans Beauverd In Stephani, 1924
- Frullania caffraria Stephani, 1894
- Frullania caffraria F. Anomala Vanden Berghen, 1976
- Frullania calcarata Ångström, 1873
- Frullania caldensis Ångström, 1876
- Frullania caledonica Gottsche Ex Stephani, 1894
- Frullania californica (Austin Ex Underwood) Evans, 1897
- Frullania campanulata Sande Lacoste, 1853
- Frullania campanulata var. caduca Verdoorn, 1930
- Frullania campanulata var. malesiaca (Verdoorn) Hattori, 1975
- Frullania canaliculata Gottsche Ex Stephani, 1910
- Frullania capensis Gottsche In G., L. & N., 1845
- Frullania capillaris Stephani, 1911
- Frullania carrii Kamimura & Hattori In Hattori & Kamimura, 1973
- Frullania casparyi Grolle, 1985
- Frullania cataractarum Stephani, 1911
- Frullania caulisequa (Nees In Martius) Montagne, 1839
- Frullania cavallii Gola, 1907
- Frullania cesatiana De Notaris, 1865
- Frullania changii Hattori & Gao, 1985
- Frullania chenii Hattori & Lin, 1985
- Frullania chevalieri (Schuster) Schuster, 1992
- Frullania chiapasana Stephani, 1910
- Frullania chilcootiensis Stephani, 1887
- Frullania chilensis Stephani, 1894
- Frullania chiovendae Gola, 1914
- Frullania chodatii Beauverd In Stephani, 1924
- Frullania ciliata Lindenberg & Gottsche In G., L. & N., 1847
- Frullania cinchonae Gottsche In G., L. & N., 1845
- Frullania clandestina (Nees & Montagne) Nees In G., L. & N., 1845
- Frullania clavata (Hooker & Taylor) Taylor In G., L. & N., 1845
- Frullania claviloba Stephani, 1911
- Frullania clemensiana Verdoorn, 1932
- Frullania cobrensis Gottsche Ex Stephani, 1894
- Frullania colliculosa von Konrat, Braggins, Hentschel & Heinrichs, 2010
- Frullania compacta Gottsche Ex Stephani, 1911
- Frullania complicata Stephani, 1911
- Frullania confertiloba Stephani, 1910
- Frullania consociata Stephani, 1910
- Frullania contracta Stephani, 1911
- Frullania controversa Beauverd In Stephani, 1924
- Frullania convoluta Lindenberg & Hampe In Hampe, 1851
- Frullania convoluta var. ampliata Herzog, 1953
- Frullania cordaeana Lindenberg In G., L. & N., 1845
- Frullania cordistipula (Reinwardt, Blume & Nees) Nees In G., L. & N., 1845
- Frullania cordistipula var. (Beta) mutica Nees In G., L. & N., 1845
- Frullania cordistipula var. (Gamma) regularis Nees In G., L. & N., 1845
- Frullania cordistipula var. dentistipula Hattori, 1986
- Frullania cornuta Stephani, 1911
- Frullania crassitexta Stephani, 1910
- Frullania crawfordii Stephani, 1894
- Frullania crenulifolia Jack & Stephani, 1892
- Frullania crinoidea Spruce Ex Stephani In Stephani, 1911
- Frullania crispiloba Stephani, 1894
- Frullania crispiplicata Yuzawa & Hattori Ex Konstantinova, Potemkin & Schijakov, 1992
- Frullania cristata Hattori, 1981
- Frullania cuencensis Taylor, 1846
- Frullania cuneatistipula Stephani, 1924
- Frullania cuneiloba Nees In G., L. & N., 1845
- Frullania curviramea Stephani, 1911
- Frullania curvirostris Colenso, 1889
- Frullania curvistipula Stephani, 1911
- Frullania curvistipula var. falcatidenta Hattori, 1982
- Frullania curvistipula var. lamii Verdoorn, 1930
- Frullania curvistipula var. latistipula Hattori, 1978
- Frullania cuspidifolia Stephani, 1911
- Frullania cuspiloba Stephani, 1910
- Frullania cyparioides (Schwägrichen) Schwaegrichen In G., L. & N., 1845

D

- Frullania darwinii Gradstein & Uribe In Uribe, 2004
- Frullania davurica Hampe In G., L. & N., 1845
- Frullania davurica F. Dorsoblastos (Hattori) Hattori & Lin, 1985
- Frullania davurica F. Microphylla (Massalongo) Hattori & Lin, 1985
- Frullania davurica var. chichibuensis (Kamimura) Hattori, 1976
- Frullania davurica var. concava Chang In Gao & Chang, 1981
- Frullania debilis Stephani Ex Hattori, 1974
- Frullania decidua Spruce, 1884
- Frullania deflexa Mitten, 1862
- Frullania degelii Arnell, 1959
- Frullania densifolia Subsp. Andamana Hattori Ex Singh In Nath & Asthana, 2001
- Frullania densiloba Stephani Ex Evans, 1906
- Frullania dentata Hattori, 1974
- Frullania dentata var. secernens Hattori, 1988
- Frullania dentifera Hattori & Streimann, 1985
- Frullania dentiloba Hattori, 1975
- Frullania deplanata Mitten In Hooker, 1855
- Frullania deppii Gottsche Ex Lehmann, 1844
- Frullania depressa Mitten, 1863
- Frullania dilatata Subsp. (Dilatata 1982) (L.) Dumortier, 1835
- Frullania dilatata Subsp. (Dilatata 1982) F. Fuscovirens Jorgensen, 1934
- Frullania dilatata Subsp. (Dilatata 1982) var. anomala Corbiere, 1889
- Frullania dilatata Subsp. (Dilatata 1982) var. macrotus Nees, 1838
- Frullania dilatata Subsp. (Dilatata 1982) var. subtilissima Nees, 1838
- Frullania dilatata Subsp. Asiatica Hattori, 1982
- Frullania diptera (Lehmann & Lindenberg) Drège, 1843
- Frullania dispar Nees In G., L. & N., 1845
- Frullania diversitexta Stephani, 1897
- Frullania donnellii Austin, 1879
- Frullania dulimensis Uribe, 2006
- Frullania durifolia Stephani, 1894
- Frullania dusenii Stephani In Dusen, 1905
- Frullania duthiana Stephani, 1910
- Frullania duthiana var. laevis Hattori In Ohashi, 1975
- Frullania duthiana var. szechuanensis Hattori & Gao, 1985

E

- Frullania eboracensis (Subsp. Eboracensis 1992) Gottsche Ex Lehmann, 1844
- Frullania eboracensis Subsp. Virginica (Gottsche In Lehmann) Schuster, 1992
- Frullania echinantha Hattori, 1974
- Frullania echinatella Hattori, 1988
- Frullania ecklonii (Sprengel) Sprengel In G., L. & N., 1845
- Frullania ecklonii F. Robustior Gottsche, 1863
- Frullania ecklonii F. Tenerior Sprengel, 1847
- Frullania ecklonii var. huitamalcensis Gottsche, 1863
- Frullania ecklonii var. rufescens Sprengel, 1847
- Frullania ecuadoriensis Stephani, 1911
- Frullania elegans Lehmann, 1857
- Frullania elephantum Hattori, 1977
- Frullania engelii Hattori, 1983
- Frullania epiphylla Subsp. Fijiensis Hattori, 1985
- Frullania eplicata Stephani, 1911
- Frullania ericoides (Nees In Martius) Montagne, 1839
- Frullania ericoides F. Ericoides (Nees) Verdoorn Ex Piippo, 1990
- Frullania ericoides var. planescens (Verdoorn) Hattori, 1984
- Frullania erostrata Hattori, 1974
- Frullania errans Verdoorn, 1930
- Frullania errans var. angulistipula Hattori, 1972
- Frullania esenbeckiana Beauverd Ex Stephani, 1924
- Frullania evelynae Hattori & Thaithong, 1978
- Frullania evoluta Mitten, 1861
- Frullania expansa Stephani, 1897
- Frullania eymae Hattori, 1975
- Frullania eymae var. crispidentata Hattori & Streimann, 1985

F

- Frullania falciloba Taylor Ex Lehmann, 1844
- Frullania fallax Gottsche In G., L. & N., 1845
- Frullania falsicornuta Hattori, 1986
- Frullania falsisinuata Hattori & Piippo, 1986
- Frullania falsisinuata F. Parvistylata (Hattori) Hattori & Piippo, 1986
- Frullania falsisinuata var. crispidentata Hattori & Piippo, 1986
- Frullania fauriana Stephani, 1894
- Frullania fauriana F. Emarginata Kamimura, 1952
- Frullania fengyangshanensis Zhu & So, 1997
- Frullania ferdinandi-Muelleri Stephani, 1910
- Frullania fertilis var. major Massalongo, 1885
- Frullania flammea Taylor Ex Spruce, 1884
- Frullania flexicaulis Spruce, 1884
- Frullania flexuosa Hattori, 1983
- Frullania fragilifolia (Taylor) Taylor In G., L. & N., 1845
- Frullania franciscana Howe, 1894
- Frullania fuegiana Stephani, 1910
- Frullania fugax (Hooker & Taylor) Taylor In G., L. & N., 1845
- Frullania fulfordiae Hattori, 1987
- Frullania fusco-Virens Stephani, 1910
- Frullania fusco-Virens var. gemmipara (Schuster & Hattori In Hattori) Hattori & Lin, 1985

G

- Frullania gabonensis Vanden Berghen, 1976
- Frullania gaoligongensis Bai & Gao, 1999
- Frullania gaudichaudii (Nees & Montagne) Nees & Montagne In G., L. & N., 1845
- Frullania gaudichaudii F. Hasseltii (Sande Lacoste) Verdoorn, 1930
- Frullania gemmulosa Hattori & Thaithong In Hattori, Thaithong & Kitagawa, 1977
- Frullania gibbosa (Nees) Nees In Montagne, 1840
- Frullania gibbosa var. major Gottsche, 1863
- Frullania gigantea Stephani, 1911
- Frullania giraldiana Massalongo, 1897
- Frullania giraldiana var. handelii (Verdoorn) Hattori, 1972
- Frullania globosa Hattori & Streimann, 1985
- Frullania glomerata (Lehmann & Lindenberg In Lehmann) Lehmann & Lindenberg Ex Montagne, 1838
- Frullania gracilicaulis Hattori, 1977
- Frullania gracilis Subsp. (Gracilis 1978) (Reinwardt, Blume & Nees) Gottsche In G., L. & N., 1845
- Frullania gracilis Subsp. (Gracilis 1978) var. brevior Nees In G., L. & N., 1845
- Frullania gracilis Subsp. (Gracilis 1978) var. vittata Hattori, 1986
- Frullania gracilis Subsp. Zennoskei Hattori & Thaithong, 1978
- Frullania gradsteinii Yuzawa, Mues & Hattori, 1987
- Frullania granatensis Gottsche, 1864
- Frullania grandifolia Stephani, 1911
- Frullania grandilobula Hattori & Piippo, 1986
- Frullania grandistipula Lindenberg In G., L. & N., 1845
- Frullania griffithsiana Gottsche In G., L. & N., 1846
- Frullania grolleana Hattori, 1972
- Frullania grossiclava Stephani, 1910
- Frullania grossifolia Stephani, 1911
- Frullania guadalupensis Gottsche Ex Stephani, 1911
- Frullania gualaquizana Stephani, 1911
- Frullania guatemalensis Stephani, 1911

H

- Frullania haeckeriana Lindenberg In G., L. & N., 1846
- Frullania haematocysta Spruce, 1884
- Frullania hainanensis Hattori & Lin, 1986
- Frullania hamata Stephani, 1911
- Frullania hamaticoma Stephani, 1889
- Frullania hamatiloba Stephani, 1910
- Frullania hamatiloba F. Grosse-Appendiculata Hattori, 1944
- Frullania hamatiloba var. latistipula Hattori, 1975
- Frullania hamatosetacea Grolle In Grolle & Meister, 2004
- Frullania hamiflora Herzog & Clark In Clark & Schultz, 1953
- Frullania handelii Verdoorn In Handel-Mazzetti, 1930
- Frullania handel-Mazzettii Hattori, 1981
- Frullania hariotana Stephani, 1911
- Frullania harpantha Herzog, 1942
- Frullania hasskarliana Lindenberg In G., L. & N., 1845
- Frullania hasskarliana var. gracilis Hattori, 1986
- Frullania hasskarliana var. integribractea (Verdoorn) Hattori, 1975
- Frullania hasskarliana var. parvidentata Hattori, 1986
- Frullania hattoriana Godfrey & Godfrey, 1980
- Frullania hattoriantha Udar & Nath, 1981
- Frullania hattorii Konrat & Braggins, 2003
- Frullania hawaiiensis Miller, 1953
- Frullania hebridensis Stephani, 1911
- Frullania hedrantha Hattori & Kamimura, 1973
- Frullania helleri Stephani, 1910
- Frullania herzogiana Stephani, 1911
- Frullania herzogii Hattori, 1955
- Frullania heteromorpha Schiffner, 1889
- Frullania hicksiae Hattori, 1984
- Frullania hicksiae F. Litoralis Hattori, 1988
- Frullania higuchii Yuzawa & Hattori In Yuzawa & Koike, 1994
- Frullania himalayensis Stephani, 1910
- Frullania hinoi Kamimura, 1982
- Frullania hiroshii Hattori, 1980
- Frullania hirtiflora Spruce, 1884
- Frullania holostipula Hattori & Griffin Iii, 1978
- Frullania hottana Hattori, 1976
- Frullania howeana Stephani In Stephani & Watts, 1914
- Frullania huerlimannii Hattori, 1976
- Frullania huerlimannii var. dioica Hattori, 1984
- Frullania humbertii Vanden Berghen, 1976
- Frullania humilis Spruce, 1890
- Frullania hypoleuca Nees In G., L. & N., 1843
- Frullania hypoleucula Hattori, 1984

I

- Frullania imerinensis Stephani, 1911
- Frullania immersa Stephani, 1896
- Frullania incisoduthiana Hattori In Mizutani, 1979
- Frullania incisoduthiana var. parva Hattori In Mizutani, 1979
- Frullania incisostipula Stephani, 1924
- Frullania inconstans Verdoorn, 1930
- Frullania inconstans F. Integrior Verdoorn, 1930
- Frullania inconstans var. grossedentata Kamimura & Hattori, 1973
- Frullania incumbens Mitten In Hooker, 1855
- Frullania incurva Hattori, 1988
- Frullania inflata Gottsche In G., L. & N., 1845
- Frullania inflata var. communis Schuster, 1985
- Frullania inflata var. dioica Hattori & Thaithong, 1978
- Frullania inflexa Mitten, 1861
- Frullania inflexiloba Hattori, 1984
- Frullania inouei Hattori, 1980
- Frullania integristipula (Nees) Nees In G., L. & N., 1845
- Frullania integristipula var. emarginata Verdoorn, 1929
- Frullania intermedia Subsp. (Intermedia 1980) F. Billardieriana (Nees & Montagne In Montagne) Verdoorn, 1930
- Frullania intermedia Subsp. (Intermedia 1980) var. non-Apiculata Hattori, 1975
- Frullania intermedia Subsp. (Intermedia) (Reinwardt, Blume & Nees) Nees In G., L. & N., 1845
- Frullania intermedia Subsp. Morokensis (Stephani) Hattori, 1980
- Frullania intermixta Colenso, 1889
- Frullania intumescens (Lehmann & Lindenberg In Lehmann) Lehmann & Lindenberg In G., L. & N., 1845
- Frullania involuta Hampe Ex Stephani, 1911
- Frullania involvens Hattori & Kamimura, 1973
- Frullania iriomotensis Hattori, 1980
- Frullania irregularis Hattori & Piippo, 1986
- Frullania iwatsukii Hattori, 1972

J

- Frullania jackii Subsp. (Jackii 1959) Gottsche In Gottsche & Rabenhorst, 1863
- Frullania jackii Subsp. (Jackii 1959) F. Depauperata Grolle, 1970
- Frullania jacobsii Hattori, 1986
- Frullania jacquinotii Gottsche Ex Stephani, 1910
- Frullania jelskii Loitlesberger, 1894
- Frullania johnsonii Stephani, 1894
- Frullania junghuhniana Gottsche In G., L. & N., 1845
- Frullania junghuhniana var. bisexualis Hattori, 1976
- Frullania junghuhniana var. tenella (Sande Lacoste) Grolle & Hattori In Hattori, 1982
- Frullania junghuhniana var. tenella F. Monoica (Hattori) Hattori, 1986

K

- Frullania kagoshimensis Subsp. (Kagoshimensis 1985) Stephani, 1910
- Frullania kagoshimensis Subsp. (Kagoshimensis 1985) var. minor Kamimura, 1961
- Frullania kagoshimensis Subsp. Hunanensis (Hattori) Hattori, 1985
- Frullania kalimantanensis Hattori, 1986
- Frullania kalimantanensis Piippo & Hattori In Piippo & Tan, 1992
- Frullania kashyapii Verdoorn, 1932
- Frullania kitagawana Hattori, 1984
- Frullania klotzschii Nees Ex Stephani, 1911
- Frullania koponenii Hattori, 1978
- Frullania kunzei (Lehmann & Lindenberg In Lehmann) Lehmann & Lindenberg In G., L. & N., 1845
- Frullania kunzei var. maritima Schuster, 1991

L

- Frullania laetevirens Hampe In G., L. & N., 1845
- Frullania laevi-Periantha Bai & Gao, 2000
- Frullania lancistyla Stephani, 1910
- Frullania larjiana Singh & Singh, 2005
- Frullania laticaulis Spruce, 1890
- Frullania latiflora Spruce, 1884
- Frullania latogaleata Herzog, 1948
- Frullania laxiflora Spruce, 1884
- Frullania laxiflora var. crossii Spruce, 1884
- Frullania leana Austin, 1869
- Frullania leeuwenii Verdoorn, 1930
- Frullania lepida Hattori & Piippo, 1986
- Frullania letestui Vanden Berghen, 1976
- Frullania levieri Stephani, 1910
- Frullania libera Nees In G., L. & N., 1845
- Frullania lindbergiana Gottsche, 1863
- Frullania lindenbergii Gottsche Ex Lehmann, 1844
- Frullania lindenbergii var. (Beta ?) Fusca Gottsche In G., L. & N., 1847
- Frullania lindeniana Stephani, 1911
- Frullania lindmanii Stephani, 1897
- Frullania linii Hattori, 1981
- Frullania lobato-Hastata Stephani, 1911
- Frullania lobulata (Hooker) Hooker & Nees In G., L. & N., 1845
- Frullania longipinna Stephani, 1910
- Frullania longistipula Stephani In Renauld & Cardot, 1891
- Frullania longistipula var. apiculata Demaret & Vanden Berghen, 1950
- Frullania longistyla Yuzawa & Hattori, 1988
- Frullania loricata Pearson, 1891
- Frullania loricata var. laxa Pearson, 1891
- Frullania ludoviciae Stephani, 1908
- Frullania lushanensis Hattori & Lin, 1985

M

- Frullania macgregorii Stephani, 1894
- Frullania macgregorii var. rostellula (Hattori) Hattori, 1982
- Frullania macrocephala (Lehmann & Lindenberg In Lehmann) Lehmann & Lindenberg In G., L. & N., 1845
- Frullania macrophylla Hattori, 1980
- Frullania macularis Taylor, 1846
- Frullania madagascariensis Gottsche, 1882
- Frullania madens Stephani, 1924
- Frullania madothecoides Spruce, 1884
- Frullania magellanica (Sprengel) Weber & Nees In G., L. & N., 1845
- Frullania magellanica var. diminutiva Herzog, 1938
- Frullania mammilligera Grolle, 2003
- Frullania mammillosa Hattori, 1977
- Frullania matafaoica Miller, 1981
- Frullania mathanii Stephani, 1911
- Frullania mauritiana Austin, 1869
- Frullania maymyoensis Svihla, 1958
- Frullania mcveanii Hattori, 1973
- Frullania media (Hodgson) Hattori, 1983
- Frullania megalostipa Spruce, 1884
- Frullania meijeri Hattori, 1974
- Frullania meridana Stephani, 1911
- Frullania meyeniana Lindenberg In G., L. & N., 1845
- Frullania meyeniana var. dioica Hattori, 1977
- Frullania microauriculata Verdoorn, 1929
- Frullania microauriculata var. rotundior Verdoorn, 1929
- Frullania microcaulis Gola, 1923
- Frullania microcephala Gottsche, 1863
- Frullania microphylla (Gottsche In Gottsche & Rabenhorst) Pearson, 1894
- Frullania microphylla F. Corticicola Schiffner, 1936
- Frullania microphylla var. deciduifolia Grolle, 1970
- Frullania microrhyncha Clark & Svihla, 1950
- Frullania microscopica Pearson, 1922
- Frullania minor Subsp. (Minor 1975) var. integribracteola Hattori, 1975
- Frullania minor Subsp. Recurviloba Hattori, 1975
- Frullania mirabilis Jack & Stephani In Stephani, 1892
- Frullania miradorensis Lindenberg & Gottsche In G., L. & N., 1847
- Frullania mizutanii Kamimura & Hattori, 1973
- Frullania moniliata Subsp. Breviramea (Stephani) Verdoorn, 1930
- Frullania moniliata Subsp. Moniliata Crandall-Stotler, Geissler & Stotler, 1987
- Frullania moniliata Subsp. Moniliata F. Minshanensis (Hattori) Crandall-Stotler Et Alii, 1987
- Frullania moniliata Subsp. Moniliata var. elongatistipula (Verdoorn) Crandall-Stotler Et Alii, 1987
- Frullania moniliata Subsp. Moniliata var. vietnamica (Hattori) Crandall-Stotler Et Alii, 1987
- Frullania monocera (Hooker & Taylor) Taylor In G., L. & N., 1845
- Frullania monocera var. depauperata Hattori, 1984
- Frullania monocera var. schiffneri (Verdoorn) Hattori, 1979
- Frullania monoica Stephani, 1900
- Frullania montagnei Gottsche In G., L. & N., 1845
- Frullania montana Stephani, 1910
- Frullania moritziana Lindenberg & Gottsche In G., L. & N, 1847
- Frullania moritziana var. (Beta) Mexicana Gottsche, 1863
- Frullania morobensis Hattori & Streimann, 1985
- Frullania motoyana Stephani, 1911
- Frullania mucronata (Lehmann & Lindenberg In Lehmann) Lehmann & Lindenberg
- Frullania mucronata var. submutica Lehmann & Lindenberg In G., L. & N. 1845 In G., L. & N., 1845
- Frullania multilacera Subsp. (Multilacera 1987) Stephani, 1911
- Frullania multilacera Subsp. (Multilacera 1987) var. lacerissima Hattori, 1975
- Frullania multilacera Subsp. Gracilior Hattori, 1987
- Frullania multilaceroides Hattori, 1987
- Frullania muscicola Stephani, 1894
- Frullania mutilata Stephani, 1911

N

- Frullania nadeaudii Stephani, 1911
- Frullania neocaledonica Engel In Engel & Merrill, 1999
- Frullania neosheana Hattori, 1979
- Frullania nepalensis (Sprengel) Lehmann & Lindenberg In G., L. & N., 1845
- Frullania neurota Taylor, 1846
- Frullania nicholsonii Hodgson, 1949
- Frullania nigricaulis (R., B. & N.) Nees In G., L. & N., 1845
- Frullania nigricaulis var. elongata Verdoorn, 1930
- Frullania nisquallensis Sullivant, 1849
- Frullania nivimontana Hattori, 1982
- Frullania nobilis Stephani, 1894
- Frullania nobilis var. cochleata (Stephani) Hattori In Hattori & Streimann, 1985
- Frullania nodulosa (Reinwardt, Blume & Nees) Nees In G., L. & N., 1845
- Frullania notarsii Stephani, 1911
- Frullania novocurvirostris Hattori, 1981
- Frullania novoguineensis Schiffner, 1890

O

- Frullania oahuensis Hampe In G., L. & N., 1843
- Frullania oakesiana Subsp. (Oakesiana 1992) Austin, 1870
- Frullania oakesiana Subsp. Takayuensis (Stephani) Schuster, 1992
- Frullania obovata Hattori, 1982
- Frullania obscurifolia Mitten, 1879
- Frullania ocanniensis Stephani, 1924
- Frullania ocellata Kamimura & Hattori, 1973
- Frullania odontostipa Spruce, 1890
- Frullania okinawensis Kamimura, 1982
- Frullania onraedtii Vanden Berghen, 1976
- Frullania orbicularis Austin, 1869
- Frullania orientalis Sande Lacoste, 1855
- Frullania orinocensis Spruce, 1883
- Frullania ornithocephala (Reinwardt, Blume & Nees) Nees In G., L. & N., 1845
- Frullania ornithocephala F. Magnilobula Hattori, 1976
- Frullania ornithocephala F. Retusa Hattori, 1976
- Frullania ornithocephala F. Teres (Sande Lacoste) Verdoorn, 1929
- Frullania ornithocephala var. maior Nees, 1845
- Frullania ornithocephala var. minor Nees, 1845
- Frullania ornithocephala var. pilosa Verdoorn, 1929
- Frullania ornithocephala var. tuberculosa Hattori, 1974
- Frullania osculatiana Notaris, 1855
- Frullania osumiensis (Hattori) Hattori In Iwatsuki & Hattori, 1956
- Frullania osumiensis var. dentata Kamimura, 1970

P

- Frullania pachyderma Hattori, 1978
- Frullania pallide-Virens Stephani, 1911
- Frullania pallidula Hattori, 1988
- Frullania pancheri Gottsche Ex Stephani, 1894
- Frullania papillata Stephani, 1911
- Frullania papillilobula Hattori, 1975
- Frullania papuana Verdoorn, 1930
- Frullania papulosa Stephani, 1911
- Frullania paradoxa Lehmann & Lindenberg In G., L. & N., 1845
- Frullania paradoxa F. Cornistipula Herzog, 1952
- Frullania parhami (Schuster) Schuster, 1992
- Frullania pariharii Hattori & Thaithong, 1978
- Frullania pariharii F. Intermedia Hattori & Thaithong, 1978
- Frullania parvifolia Stephani, 1910
- Frullania parvistipula Stephani, 1910
- Frullania patagonica Stephani, 1910
- Frullania patula Mitten In Hooker, 1855
- Frullania pauciramea Stephani, 1911
- Frullania pauciramea var. pauciramella Hattori & Piippo, 1986
- Frullania paucirameoides Hattori & Piippo, 1986
- Frullania pearceana Stephani, 1911
- Frullania pedicellata Stephani, 1897
- Frullania pentapleura Subsp. (Pentapleura 1988) Taylor, 1846
- Frullania peruviana Gottsche In G., L. & N., 1846
- Frullania phalangiflora Stephani, 1916
- Frullania philippinensis Stephani, 1911
- Frullania physantha Mitten Mitten, 1861
- Frullania pilibracteola Hattori, 1977
- Frullania piliflora Stephani, 1911
- Frullania piliflora var. appendiculata Herzog, 1951
- Frullania pilistipula Stephani, 1911
- Frullania piptophylla Hattori, 1980
- Frullania piptophylla var. minor Hattori, 1986
- Frullania piptophylloides Hattori, 1980
- Frullania pittier I Stephani, 1892
- Frullania plana Sullivant, 1849
- Frullania planifolia Stephani, 1910
- Frullania platycalyx Herzog, 1952
- Frullania platyphylla Colenso, 1889
- Frullania pluricarinata Gottsche, 1864
- Frullania pocsantha Thaithong & Hattori, 1977
- Frullania polyclada Colenso, 1889
- Frullania polyptera Taylor, 1846
- Frullania polyptera var. angustata (Mitten) Hattori, 1975
- Frullania polysticta Lindenberg In G., L. & N., 1845
- Frullania ponapensis Hattori & Koike In Koike, 1994
- Frullania pringlei Fulford & Sharp, 1990
- Frullania probosciphora Taylor, 1846
- Frullania prominula Hattori & Streimann, 1985
- Frullania propaginea Hattori & Streimann, 1985
- Frullania pseudericoides Hattori, 1982
- Frullania pseudericoides Hattori, 1986
- Frullania pseudomeyeniana Hattori, 1986
- Frullania pseudomonocera Hattori, 1986
- Frullania pseudoschensiana Hattori, 1980
- Frullania pseudoschensiana var. darjeelingensis Hattori, 1981
- Frullania ptychantha Montagne, 1843
- Frullania pulchella Herzog, 1954
- Frullania pullei Verdoorn, 1930
- Frullania pulogensis Stephani, 1911
- Frullania punctata Reimers, 1931
- Frullania purpurea Stephani, 1911
- Frullania pusilla Mitten, 1871
- Frullania pycnantha (Hooker & Taylor) Taylor In G., L. & N., 1845
- Frullania pycnoclada Grolle In Grolle & Meister, 2004
- Frullania pyricalycina Stephani, 1910

Q

- Frullania queenslandica Stephani, 1910
- Frullania quillotensis (Nees & Montagne) Nees & Montagne In Montagne In Alcide D'orbigny, 1839
- Frullania quillotensis F. Flaccida Herzog, 1954
- Frullania quillotensis F. Leiantha Herzog, 1954

R

- Frullania rabenhorstii Stephani, 1911
- Frullania ramuligera (Nees) Montagne, 1842
- Frullania recurvistipula Hattori, 1975
- Frullania reflexistipula Sande Lacoste, 1853
- Frullania reflexistipula var. novocaledonica Hattori, 1977
- Frullania reflexistipula var. squarrosa Hattori & Piippo, 1986
- Frullania regularis Schiffner, 1890
- Frullania reicheana Stephani, 1910
- Frullania reimersii Verdoorn, 1930
- Frullania remotidens Hattori, 1872
- Frullania remotifolia Stephani, 1911
- Frullania remotiloba Stephani, 1894
- Frullania repanda Gottsche, 1864
- Frullania repandistipula Subsp. (Repandistipula 1975) Sande Lacoste, 1853
- Frullania repandistipula Subsp. Queenslandica Hattori, 1987
- Frullania repandistipula Subsp. Spinibractea Hattori, 1975
- Frullania reptans var. integristipula Nicholson, 1925
- Frullania retusa Mitten, 1861
- Frullania retusa var. gymnantha Hattori & Thaithong, 1978
- Frullania retusa var. hirsuta Hattori & Thaithong, 1978
- Frullania rhystocolea Herzog Ex Verdoorn In Handel-Mazzetti, 1930
- Frullania rhytidantha Hattori, 1980
- Frullania rigescens Spruce, 1884
- Frullania rigida Stephani, 1910
- Frullania ringens Spruce, 1884
- Frullania riojaneirensis (Raddi) Ångström, 1876
- Frullania riparia Hampe Ex Lehmann, 1838
- Frullania rizalli Piippo & Hattori, 1992
- Frullania rostellata Mitten In Hooker, 1867
- Frullania rostrata (Hooker & Taylor) Hooker & Taylor In G., L. & N., 1845
- Frullania rubella Gottsche Ex Stephani, 1889
- Frullania rubella var. elongata (Stephani) Hattori, 1983
- Frullania rudolfiana Hattori, 1972
- Frullania rupicola Stephani, 1924

S

- Frullania sabahana Hattori, 1976
- Frullania sabaliana Schuster, 1983
- Frullania sabanetica Gottsche, 1864
- Frullania sachapatensis Stephani, 1911
- Frullania sackawana Stephani, 1897
- Frullania sackawana var. minor Kamimura, 1982
- Frullania saipanensis Hattori & Koike In Koike, 1994
- Frullania sarawakensis Hattori, 1976
- Frullania scalaris Hattori, 1977
- Frullania scandens Montagne, 1843
- Frullania schaefer-Verwimpii Yuzawa & Hattori, 1989
- Frullania schensiana Massalongo, 1897
- Frullania schiffneri Verdoorn, 1929
- Frullania schimperi Nees In G., L. & N., 1845
- Frullania schimperi var. laciniata Vanden Berghen, 1976
- Frullania schumannii (Caspary) Grolle, 1981
- Frullania schusteri Hattori, 1988
- Frullania schusteriana Hattori, 1972
- Frullania scottiana Hattori, 1987
- Frullania sebastianopolitana var. (Delta) Gottsche, 1864
- Frullania selwyniana Pearson, 1890
- Frullania semienana Gola, 1914
- Frullania semivillosa Lindenberg & Gottsche In G., L. & N., 1847
- Frullania semivillosa var. (Beta) Glabra Lindenberg & Gottsche In G., L. & N., 1847
- Frullania sergiae Sim-Sim, Fontihna, Mues & Lion, 2000
- Frullania seriata Gottsche Ex Stephani, 1889
- Frullania seriatifolia Stephani, 1894
- Frullania serrata Subsp. (Serrata 1982) Gottsche In G., L. & N., 1845
- Frullania serrata Subsp. (Serrata 1982) F. Crispulodentata Verdoorn, 1929
- Frullania serrata Subsp. (Serrata 1982) F. Vogelkopensis Hattori, 1982
- Frullania serrata Subsp. (Serrata 1982) var. ceramensis Hattori, 1986
- Frullania serrata Subsp. (Serrata 1982) var. hamatispina (Hattori) Hattori, 1982
- Frullania serrata Subsp. (Serrata 1982) var. oceanica Verdoorn, 1937
- Frullania serrata Subsp. (Serrata 1982) var. pertenuis (Nees) Gottsche In G., L. & N., 1845
- Frullania serrata Subsp. Grolleana Grolle & Piippo, 1984
- Frullania serrata Subsp. Spinistipula (Hattori) Hattori, 1982
- Frullania setacea Hattori, 1988
- Frullania setigera Stephani, 1894
- Frullania shanensis Svihla, 1957
- Frullania sharpantha Udar & Kumar, 1983
- Frullania sharpii Hattori, 1974
- Frullania sheana Hattori, 1979
- Frullania simmondsii Stephani In Stephani & Watts, 1914
- Frullania sinensis Stephani In Levier, 1906
- Frullania sinosphaerantha Hattori & Lin, 1985
- Frullania sinuata Subsp. Sinuata 1975 Sande Lacoste, 1853
- Frullania sinuata Subsp. Sinuata F. Parvistylata Hattori In Grolle & Piippo, 1984
- Frullania socotrana Mitten In Balfour, 1888
- Frullania solanderiana Colenso, 1889
- Frullania spathulistipa Stephani, 1910
- Frullania speciosa Herzog, 1949
- Frullania spegazzinii Reiner, 1988
- Frullania sphaerantha Hattori, 1980
- Frullania sphaerocephala Spruce, 1884
- Frullania sphaerolobulata Lin In Lin & Chen, 1997
- Frullania spicata (Lehmann & Lindenberg In Lehmann) Lehmann & Lindenberg In G., L. & N., 1845
- Frullania spinifera Taylor, 1846
- Frullania spinigastria Hattori, 1979
- Frullania spiniplica Hattori, 1972
- Frullania spinistipula Stephani, 1911
- Frullania spongiosa Stephani, 1894
- Frullania squamuligera Spruce, 1884
- Frullania squarrosula (Hooker & Taylor) Taylor In G., L. & N., 1845
- Frullania standaerti Stephani, 1910
- Frullania steereana Hattori, 1987
- Frullania stenostipa Spruce, 1884
- Frullania streimannii Hattori, 1983
- Frullania stylifera (Schuster) Schuster, 1992
- Frullania subcaduca Hattori, 1974
- Frullania subclavata Stephani, 1910
- Frullania subdentata Stephani, 1911
- Frullania subdentata F. Longistipula Hattori, 1978
- Frullania subdilatata Massalongo In Levier, 1906
- Frullania subhampeana Hodgson, 1949
- Frullania subincumbens Hattori, 1987
- Frullania sublignosa Stephani, 1894
- Frullania submultilacera Hattori & Koike In Koike, 1994
- Frullania subnigricaulis Hattori, 1973
- Frullania subnigricaulis var. subtruncata Hattori, 1975
- Frullania subocellata Hattori, 1986
- Frullania subpedicellata Hattori, 1980
- Frullania subpilibracteola Hattori, 1977
- Frullania subpyricalycina Herzog, 1954
- Frullania subrostrata Hattori, 1972
- Frullania subsquarrosa Hattori, 1972
- Frullania subtilissima Lindenberg In G., L. & N., 1845
- Frullania subtropica Stephani, 1910
- Frullania subtruncata Stephani, 1910
- Frullania subvalida Hattori & Thaithong, 1978
- Frullania supradecomposita (Lehmann & Lindenberg In Lehmann) Lehmann & Lindenberg In G., L. & N., 1845
- Frullania svihlana Hattori, 1983

T

- Frullania tagawana (Hattori, Thaithong & Kitawana) Hattori In Hattori & Lin, 1985
- Frullania taiheizana Horikawa, 1934
- Frullania tamarisci (L.) Dumortier, 1835
- Frullania tamarisci var. atlantica Schiffner, 1936
- Frullania tamarisci var. atrovirens Carrington, 1863
- Frullania tamarisci var. commutata Nees In G., L. & N., 1845
- Frullania tamarisci var. cornubica Carrington In Carrington & Pearson, 1878
- Frullania tamarisci var. laxa Nees In G., L. & N., 1845
- Frullania tamarisci var. mediterranea (De Notaris) Nees In G., L. & N., 1845
- Frullania tamarisci var. robusta Lindberg, 1875
- Frullania tamarisci var. sardoa (De Notaris) De Notaris, 1865
- Frullania tamarisci var. schiffneri Nicholson, 1933
- Frullania tamsuina Stephani, 1910
- Frullania taradakenis Stephani, 1910
- Frullania taxodiocola Schuster, 1983
- Frullania teneriffae (Weber) Nees, 1838
- Frullania teneriffae F. Explanata (Macvicar) Bisang, Schumacker, Sérgio & Grolle, 1988
- Frullania teneriffae var. germana (Taylor) Bisang, Schumacker, Sérgio & Grolle, 1988
- Frullania tenuirostris Stephani, 1911
- Frullania ternatensis Gottsche In G., L. & N., 1846
- Frullania ternatensis var. non-Appendiculata Hattori, 1974
- Frullania tetraptera Nees & Montagne In Montagne, 1838
- Frullania thiersiae Hattori, 1988
- Frullania tixieri Hattori, 1976
- Frullania tjibodensis Hattori & Thaithong, 1977
- Frullania togashiana Hattori, 1975
- Frullania tongariroense Colenso, 1889
- Frullania trianae Gottsche, 1864
- Frullania tricarinata Sande Lacoste, 1856
- Frullania trichodes Mitten, 1862
- Frullania trigona Clark, Jovet-Ast & Frye, 1947
- Frullania trinervis (Lehmann & Lindenberg) Drège, 1843
- Frullania triquetra Lindenberg & Gottsche In G., L. & N., 1847
- Frullania trollii Herzog, 1942
- Frullania truncata Caspary, 1887
- Frullania truncatistyla von Konrat et al., 2011
- Frullania tubercularis Hattori & Lin, 1985
- Frullania tunguraguana Clark & Frye, 1952
- Frullania turfosa Lindenberg & Gottsche In G., L. & N., 1847
- Frullania tuyamae Hattori & Thaithong, 1978

U

- Frullania udarii Nath & Singh, 2006
- Frullania umbonata Mitten Ex Stephani, 1911
- Frullania undulata Kamimura, 1961
- Frullania usambarana Schiffner Ex Stephani, 1894
- Frullania usambarana var. reducta Vanden Berghen, 1976
- Frullania usamiensis Stephani, 1897
- Frullania utriculata Stephani, 1894

V

- Frullania vaga Mitten In Seemann, 1871
- Frullania vaginata (Swartz) Nees In G., L. & N., 1846
- Frullania valdiviensis Jack & Stephani In Stephani, 1894
- Frullania valida Stephani, 1910
- Frullania valparaisiana Lehmann, 1857
- Frullania vandenberghenii Pocs In Bizot & Pocs, 1979
- Frullania van-Zantenii Kamimura & Hattori, 1973
- Frullania variabilis Stephani, 1910
- Frullania varians Caspary, 1887
- Frullania variegata Stephani, 1894
- Frullania venusta Hattori, 1974
- Frullania verdoorniana Hattori, 1973
- Frullania victoriensis Stephani, 1910
- Frullania vitalii Yuzawa & Hattori, 1988
- Frullania vittata Hattori, 1974
- Frullania vittata F. Denticulata Hattori, 1980
- Frullania vittiana Hattori, 1987

W

- Frullania wagneri Stephani, 1910
- Frullania wairua Konrat & Braggins, 2005
- Frullania wangii Hattori & Lin, 1985
- Frullania warnckeana Hattori, 1974
- Frullania warnckeana var. dentosa Hattori, 1977
- Frullania weberbaueri Stephani, 1911
- Frullania winteri Stephani, 1910
- Frullania winteri var. vanderhammenii (Haarbrink) Yuzawa, 1991

Y

- Frullania yorkiana Stephani, 1911
- Frullania yuennanensis Stephani, 1894
- Frullania yuennanensis var. siamensis (Hatt. et al.) Hattori & Lin, 1985
- Frullania yusawae Kamimura, 1970
- Frullania yuzawana Hattori, 1981

Z

- Frullania zangii Hattori & Lin, 1985
- Frullania zennoskeana Hattori, 1984

== Extinct species ==
- †Frullania baerlocheri Heinrichs et al., 2012 Burmese amber, Myanmar, Cenomanian
- †Frullania cretacea Hentschel et al., 2009 Burmese amber, Myanmar, Cenomanian
- †Frullania partita Li et al., 2020 Burmese amber, Myanmar, Cenomanian
- †Frullania pinnata Heinrichs et al., 2017 Burmese amber, Myanmar, Cenomanian
