= Frullania nisquallensis =

Scientific classification
- Kingdom: Plantae
- Division: Marchantiophyta
- Class: Jungermanniopsida
- Order: Frullaniales
- Family: Frullaniaceae
- Genus: Frullania
- Species: F. nisquallensis

Binomial name
- Frullania nisquallensis Sull.

Species of liverwort

Frullania nisquallensis, commonly known as hanging millipede liverwort, is a reddish-brown species of liverwort in the family Frullaniaceae. It is found in western Washington and British Columbia, including Vancouver Island. The plant grows in mats, sometimes in mats that hang from tree branches (particularly those of alders, or maples), or growing close to the substrate. The leaves are small (1 mm long) and flat, with the lower leaves being slightly smaller than those growing higher up the stem.

== Secondary metabolites ==
This species contains the tridepside compound tenuiron, and the sesquiterpenes (-)-frullanolide and costunolide, the latter of which has been shown to be damaging to DNA.
