= Frullania colliculosa =

Scientific classification
- Kingdom: Plantae
- Division: Marchantiophyta
- Class: Jungermanniopsida
- Order: Frullaniales
- Family: Frullaniaceae
- Genus: Frullania
- Species: F. colliculosa

Binomial name
- Frullania colliculosa von Konrat, Braggins, Hentschel & Heinrichs, 2010

Species of liverwort in New Zealand

Frullania colliculosa is a species of liverwort in the order Porellales, native to New Zealand. The species was first described by Matt Von Konrat, Jörn Hentschel, Jochen Heinrichs, John E. Braggins and Tamás Pócs in 2010.

== Etymology ==
The species epithet colliculosa refers to the small rounded cells found on the perianth.

== Description ==
The species is olive-green in colour, and has leaf lobules that are almost black in colour when compared to the smooth leaf lobes.

== Distribution and habitat ==
Frullania colliculosa is endemic to New Zealand, found on tree trunks and twigs typically at higher elevations.
