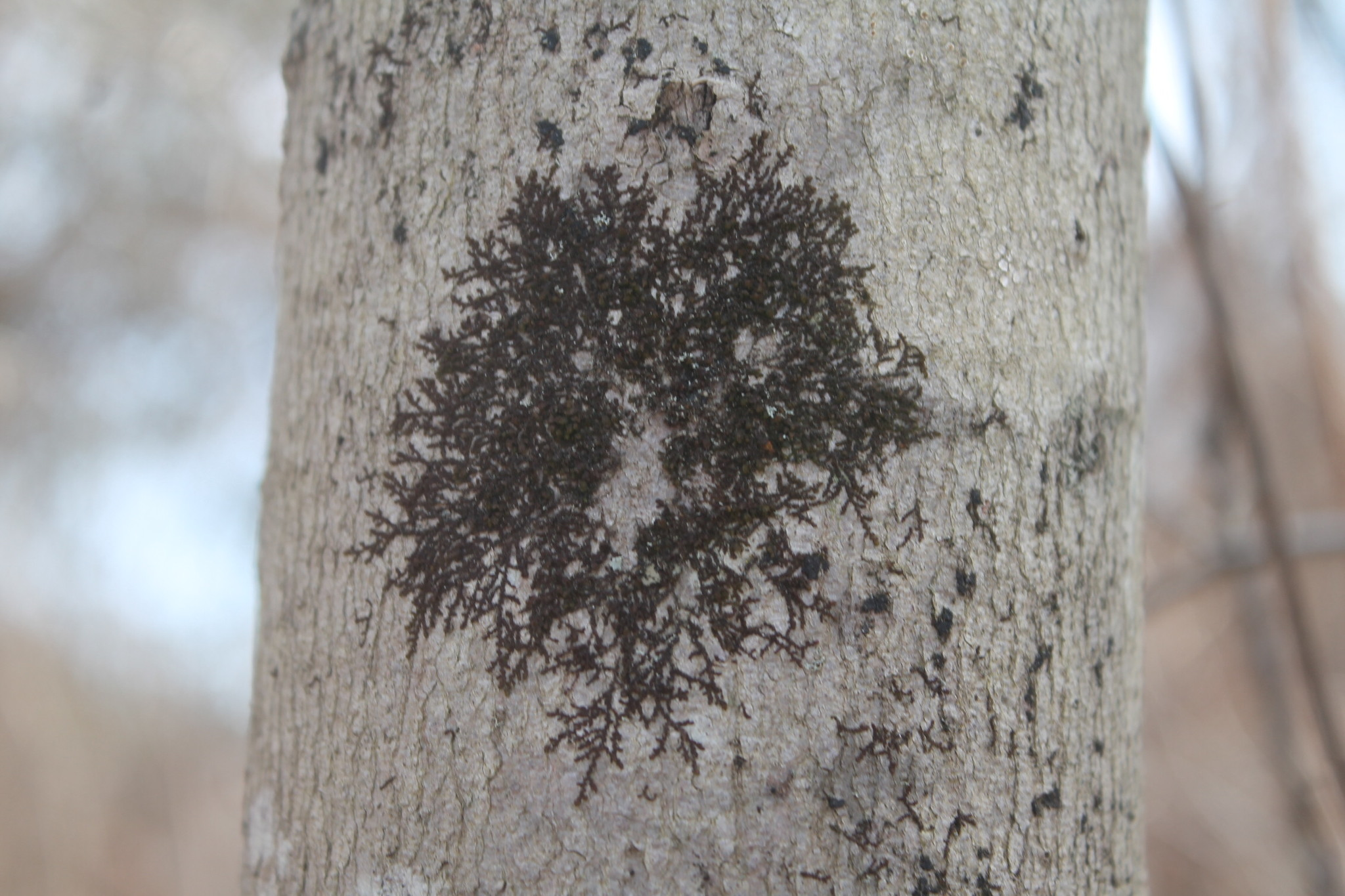

Scientific classification
- Kingdom: Plantae
- Division: Marchantiophyta
- Class: Jungermanniopsida
- Order: Frullaniales
- Family: Frullaniaceae
- Genus: Frullania
- Species: F. eboracensis

Binomial name
- Frullania eboracensis Gottsche

= Frullania eboracensis =

Species of plant

Frullania eboracensis, the New York scalewort, is a species of liverwort in the family Frullaniaceae. New York Scalewort can be distinguished from other species of scalewort by its morphology. In particular, the small size (leafy shoots only 0.8–1 mm. across), lower leaf lobes that are about as long as they are across, lower leaf lobes that are about one-third to one-half the size of upper leaf lobes, underleaves (0.15 mm. across) that are only a little wider than their stems (0.10 mm. across). The underleaves of New York Scalewort have toothless or nearly toothless lateral margins, and perianths that have smooth to slightly roughened keels along their sides (rather than tuberculate keels). Despite some distinctive morphology, microscopy is often necessary to confidently distinguish New York Scalewort from other species of Frullania, and the cells of the leaves have diagnostic irregular, jagged edges and cell walls are swollen at intervals.

== Range and habitat ==
New York Scalewort is widely-distributed in eastern North America and adjacent areas of southern Canada. Habitats include tree bark, particularly trees on rocky bluffs, along wooded slopes, in upland and lowland woodlands, along streams and ponds, and in swamps. Additionally, they can be found on exposed tree roots, fallen tree logs, and planks of wooden fences in damp shaded places. New York Scalewort is found primarily on the bark of deciduous trees, including oak, maple, ash, elm, eastern red cedar, hackberry, cottonwood, beech, and musclewood. The presence of New York Scalewort is most obvious on trees with gray bark like red maple, beech, holly and some oaks. Usually, New York Scalewort is found on the tree trunks of natural, older, mature trees rather than branches or exposed root, or on younger or cultivated trees.

== Ecology ==
New York scaleworts are dioecious, forming male and female reproductive organs on different plants. Male plants produce their reproductive organs on short lateral branches that have several pairs of leaf-like bracts. These bracts resemble the leaves, except they are somewhat smaller in size. Female plants produce their reproductive organs at the tips of stems. The female reproductive organs are contained in bud-like perianths (one perianth per stem tip); preceding and partly surrounding the base of each perianth, there are about 3 pairs of bracts. This leafy liverwort can reproduce asexually by forming gemmae (miniature buds) along the margins of its leaves, and new plants can develop when the gemmae become detached from the leaves.

Rotifers sometimes live in the helmet-shaped lower lobes of leaves, but it is unknown whether this is beneficial or harmful to the plant. Some birds, including the prothonotary warbler use the leaves to a minor extent in the construction of their nests.

== Etymology ==
The common name derives from an old Latin word (Eboracum) for York, England and refers to the state of New York, where New York Liverwort was first collected.

== Taxonomy ==
Frullania eboracensis contains the following subspecies:

- Frullania eboracensis subsp. eboracensis
- Frullania eboracensis subsp. virginica
