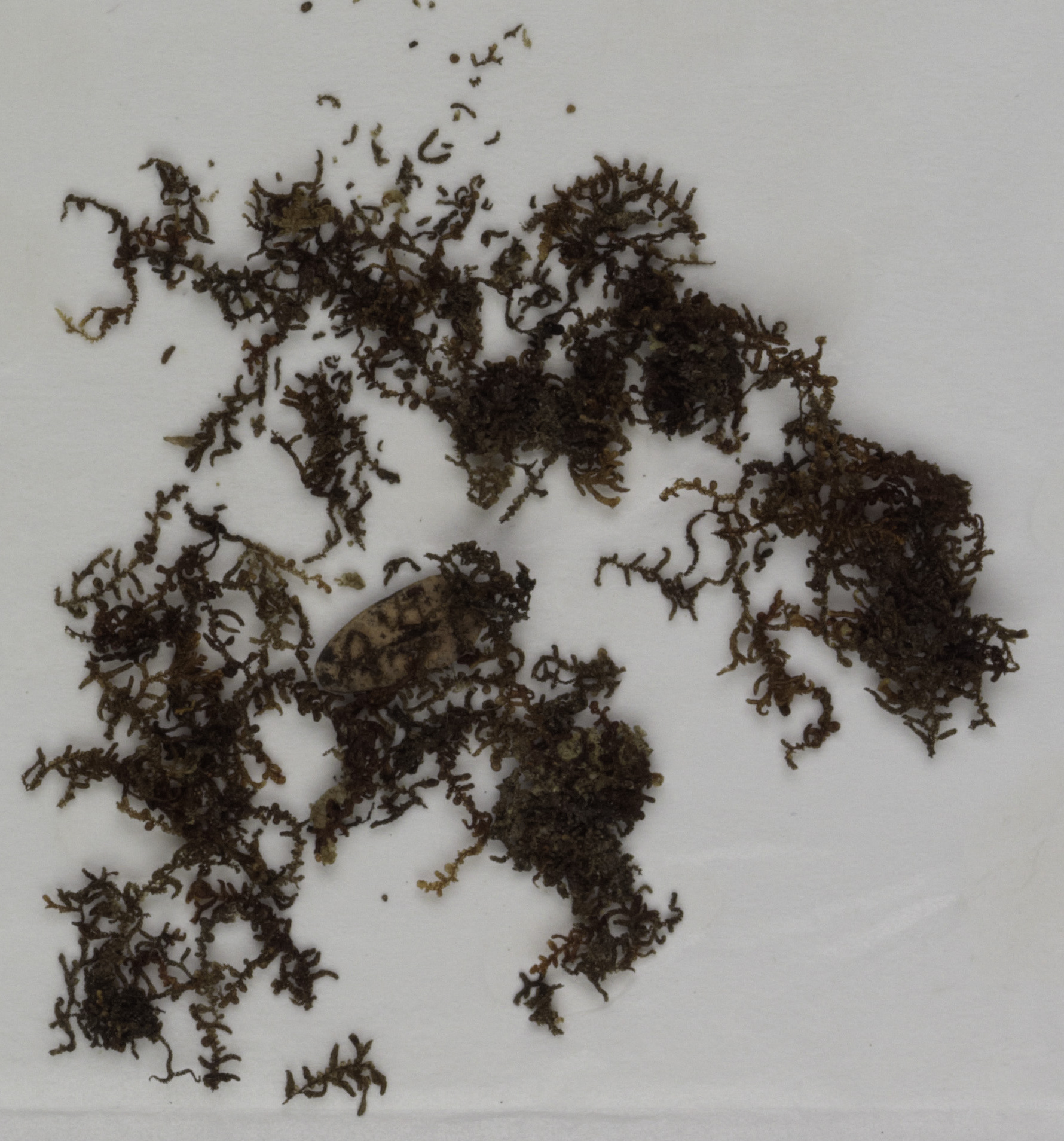
- Herbarium specimen of Frullania hattorii from the Auckland War Memorial Museum herbarium

Scientific classification
- Kingdom: Plantae
- Division: Marchantiophyta
- Class: Jungermanniopsida
- Order: Frullaniales
- Family: Frullaniaceae
- Genus: Frullania
- Species: F. hattorii

Binomial name
- Frullania hattorii von Konrat & Braggins

= Frullania hattorii =

Species of liverwort

Frullania hattorii is a species of liverwort in the order Porellales, native to Tasmania, Australia. The species was first described by Matt von Konrat and John E. Braggins in 2003.

== Etymology ==
The species was named after Japanese botanist Sinske Hattori, who identified many species of Australian Frullania in the 1970s and 1980s.

== Genetics ==
Frullania hattorii forms a clade with the New Zealand species Frullania subrostrata, and is more distantly related to the New Zealand species Frullania aterrima. Genetically, Frullania hattorii is placed within the subgenus Diastaloba I, which includes species from the Seychelles, Papua New Guinea, Thailand, Australia, New Zealand, Fiji and Sumatra.

== Description ==
The species is olive-green in colour, and has a mammillose dorsal leaf-lobe surface. This form of leaf lobe ornamentation is not found in other Frullania species.

== Distribution and habitat ==
Frullania hattorii is likely endemic to Tasmania, and is found growing on tree trunks and twigs.
