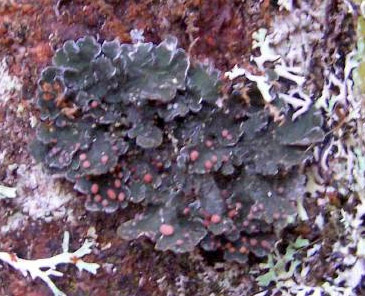
- Erioderma pedicellatum

Scientific classification
- Domain: Eukaryota
- Kingdom: Fungi
- Division: Ascomycota
- Class: Lecanoromycetes
- Order: Peltigerales
- Family: Pannariaceae
- Genus: Erioderma; Fée (1825)

Type species
- Erioderma polycarpum Fée (1825)

Synonyms
- Malmella C.W.Dodge (1933)

= Erioderma =

Genus of lichens

Erioderma is a genus of lichen-forming fungi in the family Pannariaceae. They are commonly called mouse ears or felt lichens, and are small, pale brown to olive-brown foliose cyanolichens with a fuzzy upper surface that have the cyanobacteria Scytonema as their photobiont. Most species are found in the tropics of Central and South America, although three species are found in coastal regions of North America where they generally grow on mossy branches in humid sites. All North American species are rare. Species of Erioderma can resemble Pannaria, Leioderma, or small Peltigera, but their fuzzy upper surface and lack of veins on their lower surface distinguishes them from these lichens.

== Species ==
As of October 2021, Species Fungorum accepts 24 species of Erioderma.

- Erioderma barbellatum P.M.Jørg. & Arv. (2002)
- Erioderma borbonicum P.M.Jørg. & van den Boom (2009)
- Erioderma borneense P.M.Jørg. & Sipman (2001)
- Erioderma confusum P.M.Jørg. & Sipman (2002)
- Erioderma coriaceum P.M.Jørg. & Sipman (2002)
- Erioderma cyathophorum P.M.Jørg. & Arv. (2002)
- Erioderma divisum P.M.Jørg. & Arv. (2002)
- Erioderma glabrum P.M.Jørg. (2001)
- Erioderma gloriosum P.M.Jørg. & Arv. (2002)
- Erioderma granulosum P.M.Jørg. & Arv. (2001)
- Erioderma laminisorediatum P.M.Jørg. & Arv. (2001)
- Erioderma latilobatum P.M.Jørg. & Sipman (2002)
- Erioderma leylandii (Taylor) Müll.Arg. (1888)
- Erioderma marcellii P.M.Jørg. & Arv. (2001)
- Erioderma nilsonii P.M.Jørg. & Arv. (2001)
- Erioderma papyraceum P.M.Jørg. & Arv. (2002)
- Erioderma pedicellatum (Hue) P.M.Jørg. (1972)
- Erioderma pellitum P.M.Jørg. & Sipman (2002)
- Erioderma peruvianum P.M.Jørg. & Arv. (2002)
- Erioderma polycarpum Fée (1825)
- Erioderma pycnidiiferum P.M.Jørg. & Arv. (2002)
- Erioderma reticulatum P.M.Jørg. & Arv. (2002)
- Erioderma rigidum P.M.Jørg. (2001)
- Erioderma sinuatum P.M.Jørg. & Arv. (2002)
- Erioderma sorediatum D.J.Galloway & P.M.Jørg. (1975)
