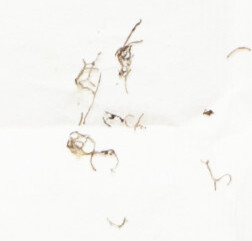
- Herbarium specimen of Frullania truncatistyla from the Te Papa herbarium

Scientific classification
- Kingdom: Plantae
- Division: Marchantiophyta
- Class: Jungermanniopsida
- Order: Frullaniales
- Family: Frullaniaceae
- Genus: Frullania
- Species: F. truncatistyla

Binomial name
- Frullania truncatistyla von Konrat et al., 2011

= Frullania truncatistyla =

Species of liverwort in New Zealand

Frullania truncatistyla is a species of liverwort in the order Porellales. The species was first described by Matt von Konrat, Jörn Hentschel, Jochen Heinrichs and John E. Braggins in 2011, and is native to New Zealand.

== Etymology ==
The epithet truncatistyla was chosen by researchers to describe the truncate stylus of the species, likely a unique feature of this liverwort within the Frullania genus.

== Description ==
Frullania truncatistyla is a particularly small species of liverwort, growing up to a width of 500 μm (0.020 in). The species forms patches of varying colours, from olive-green, copper-brown to black. The species is morphologically similar to Frullania knightbridgei and Frullania rostrata.

== Distribution and habitat ==
Frullania truncatistyla is endemic to New Zealand, and has been found on the North Island, South Island and Stewart Island. The holotype of the species was found the bark of a rimu tree in a poorly drained mossy forest.
