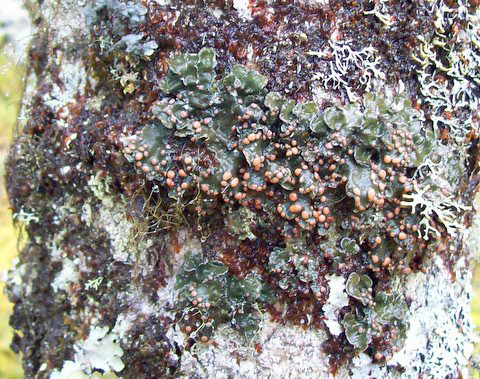

Conservation status
- Critically Endangered (IUCN 3.1)

- Imperiled (NatureServe)

Scientific classification
- Kingdom: Fungi
- Division: Ascomycota
- Class: Lecanoromycetes
- Order: Peltigerales
- Family: Pannariaceae
- Genus: Erioderma
- Species: E. pedicellatum

Binomial name
- Erioderma pedicellatum (Hue) P.M.Jørg. (1972)

Synonyms
- Pannaria pedicellata Hue (1911)

= Erioderma pedicellatum =

Species of lichen

Erioderma pedicellatum is a medium-sized, foliose lichen in the family Pannariaceae, commonly called the boreal felt lichen. It grows on trees in damp boreal forests along the Atlantic coast in Canada, as well as in southcentral Alaska, the Kamchatka Peninsula, and Norway.

== Description ==
Erioderma pedicellatum is a foliose cyanolichen with lobes 2–5 cm across, and occasionally reaching 12 cm in diameter. It has a distinctively fuzzy upper surface that is greyish-brown when dry, and slate-blue when moist. Its underside is white, and its edges usually curl upwards, giving it the appearance of having a white fringe. It differs from the two other North American species of Erioderma by lacking soredia, and by having small, reddish-brown apothecia on its upper surface.

== Taxonomy and naming ==
Erioderma pedicellatum was first collected in 1902 from Campobello Island, Charlotte County, New Brunswick, Canada, by William Gilson Farlow. It was originally identified as a species of Pannaria and named Pannaria pedicellata by French botanist Auguste-Marie Hue. It remained in this genus until 1972 when it was reexamined by the Norwegian botanist Per Magnus Jørgensen and placed in the genus Erioderma as Erioderma pedicellatum. It is an unusual species within that genus, both because of its laminal (upper surface) apothecia (lacking in other Erioderma) and its boreal distribution. Erioderma pedicellatum has also been incorrectly called E. boreale.

== Biology and ecology ==
Erioderma pedicellatum grows on mossy trunks and branches of trees on slopes in areas that have a constant supply of moisture, and are rich in Sphagnum moss. It is usually found on balsam fir, occasionally on black spruce, and rarely on white spruce, red maple, or white birch. It does not appear to grow directly on bare bark, and is usually found growing in association with the epiphytic liverwort Frullania asagrayana. Old growth balsam fir boreal forests in wet areas of eastern Canada regenerate by gap replacement, which creates many forest stands of different ages, while still maintaining a full or partial canopy. It appears that this diversity in forest stands age is necessary for a viable population of E. pedicellatum. Natural dispersal of E. pedicellatum is evidently possible within these old-growth forests, but there are no known examples of E. pedicellatum establishing in stands previously clear-cut.

A healthy, mature specimen of E. pedicellatum can grow at a rate of 11 to 14 mm per year, and populations of this lichen have a generation time of about 30 years. The species sexually reproduces. However, as with most lichen, considerable information in understanding E. pedicellatum biology is missing, especially information about its life stages.

Scytonema cyanobacteria photobionts of this lichen make it particularly sensitive to acid rain and other atmospheric pollutants. It requires relatively cool and moist oceanic climates, and an open canopy. It deteriorates rapidly on dead trees, or if habitat succession occurs that reduces, or increases light availability. Altered micro-climatic conditions caused by extensive logging also causes E. pedicellatum to deteriorate.

=== Symbiosis ===
Erioderma pedicellatum, like all lichens, is a symbiotic, in this instance between an ascomycete fungus and cyanobacteria of the genus Scytonema, and is therefore capable of fixing nitrogen. E. pedicellatum may also be part of second symbiosis with the epiphytic liverwort Frullania asagrayana.

The symbiosis between the free-living Scytonema and the germinating ascomycete spores of E. pedicellatum is hypothesized to begin within the water sacs of Frullania asagrayana, where the fungal hyphae assimilates a cyanobacterium, and needs to develop for 5 to 10 years before it reaches a visible size. The liverwort may also benefit from the nitrogen that is being fixed by the cyanolichen growing within it. This complex relationship means that the ecological balance between E. pedicellatum and its cyanobacterial symbiont (Scytonema), its host tree, and (potentially) its liverwort nursemaid (Frullania asagrayana), is very delicate and easily impacted by logging, air pollution, and other factors. More information is needed to fully understand the symbiosis within E. pedicellatum.

== Distribution ==
Erioderma pedicellatum is distributed in the Northern Hemisphere. It can be found on both sides of the Atlantic and Pacific coastal regions.

=== Atlantic populations ===
Erioderma pedicellatum was once prevalent in Norway, Sweden, and the provinces of New Brunswick, Nova Scotia, and Newfoundland in Atlantic Canada. In Europe, it was first discovered in three nearby sites in the boreal rainforests of Norway (1938–39) and in five forested canyons in Värmland, Sweden (1941), but logging soon led to its extinction from all known European sites. However, during later intensive searches for this lichen, a few individuals were found in two new sites and one old site, and a few thousand individuals were found in one site in Rendalen, eastern Norway.

In Canada, it is no longer found in New Brunswick, and as of 2009 there were fewer than 200 individuals known in Nova Scotia. In Newfoundland, it is estimated that there are between 15,000 and 20,000 individuals. The remaining habitat in Newfoundland is therefore critical for the global survival of this species. Lockyer's Waters and Hall's Gullies on the Avalon Peninsula to the southeast, and Bay d'Espoir to the south, are three of the Newfoundland's most prolific rare lichen habitats, and are important for the conservation of E. pedicellatum. The lichen was recorded as new to Quebec in 2022.

=== Pacific populations ===
Recently, populations were discovered in Denali area of Alaska, and in the Kamchatka Peninsula of Russia, increasing the known range of the species, and is the first time the species has been observed in the Pacific region. While little is known about the population in Russia, the Alaskan population has been projected to be able to increase the global population to about 100,000 individuals based on statistical modeling (i.e. projecting the population size based on the known number of individuals counted in a certain area of the site, quantifying known variables, and the actual size of the site.) However, more research is needed on the Alaskan population to determine its population stability, as well as whether it is genetically distinct from the Atlantic populations, since the Alaskan population were found on white spruce twigs, a different type of tree usually associated with E. pedicellatum in Canada. The Canadian populations were also found mostly on trunks, as opposed to twigs.

== Conservation status ==
Lichen conservation is a growing field. E. pedicellatum is currently listed as endangered by the Committee on the Status of Endangered Wildlife in Canada (COSEWIC) and critically endangered by the International Union for Conservation of Nature (IUCN) since its last assessment in 2003.

=== Protection ===
Two of the main populations of E. pedicellatum in Newfoundland are currently within protected areas: Jipujijkuei Kuespem Provincial Park, and the Lockyer's Waters interim protected area, which was established specifically to protect this lichen. The Bay du Nord Wilderness Area in Newfoundland also includes some populations of the lichen. The Hall's Gullies site is more in jeopardy, as it remains a designated cutblock (area allowed to be forested) under the current Forest Management Operating Plan. It has been noted that populations of this lichen can decline even in protected areas, which has been linked to air pollution and introduced herbivores, such as moose.

The Atlantic population of the E. pedicellatum is protected in Canada under the Federal Species at Risk Act (SARA), and is the focus of an ongoing recovery strategy. Efforts are being made, through land purchases and agreements with landowners, to formally protect areas of forest that are home to this rare species. Furthermore, conservationists are engaging with private and government forest managers to encourage their participation in the mapping of E. pedicellatum habitat and the implementation of management plans that will prevent further habitat loss.

For the Alaskan population, in the United States, E. pedicellatum appears not to be listed on the United States Fish and Wildlife Service's Threatened and Endangered Species List. However, the population is in the Denali National Park and Preserve, a protected area, and efforts have been made by researchers to not give away its location within the site so that they will not be tampered with.

=== Threats and efforts ===
The biggest threat to E. pedicellatum is deforestation and habitat loss. Through statistical modeling, it has been shown that E. pedicellatum has an increased chance of death when growing next to areas with deforestation. The habitat of E. pedicellatum was shown to be cut down faster than it can grow back, which is of concern given E. pedicellatum's narrow habitat niche. Current models predict that the Atlantic E. pedicellatum population will continue to decrease substantially over the next 25 years.

Most current efforts in studying the status and conservation efforts of E. pedicellatum are through statistical modeling to predict its population and habitat quality. Through statistical modeling, more information has been developed on the habitat of E. pedicellatum, including how it prefers older, established forests with poor soil drainage. However, statistical modeling has disadvantages, including making broad assumptions based on missing knowledge in lichen ecology.

Efforts have been made to further understanding the effects of air quality. Air quality is shown to have a major impact on E. pedicellatum, most likely due to it being a cyanolichen. In particular, acid rain is a major concern to E. pedicellatum because its habitat is already acidic. Research has also been conducted looking at impacts from invasive gastropods, which were shown to possibly be grazing on E. pedicellatum in Nova Scotia. More research is needed on their impacts.

Researchers are trying to understand the genetic differences between each segmented population of E. pedicellatum. Currently, initial genetic analysis hypothesizes that the Pacific populations of E. pedicellatum are more diverse than the Atlantic population. However, research is still needed on how the populations interact with one another, specifically through gene flow.

In Norway, the responses of transplanted thalli of Erioderma pedicellatum have been studied to assess the feasibility of increasing its distribution; the conclusion was that reintroduction of E. pedicellatum into the boreal rainforest is possible, but challenging, since well-lit branches of Picea abies with high base cation availability in humid canopy layers are rare.
