= Frullania hodgsoniae =

Scientific classification
- Kingdom: Plantae
- Division: Marchantiophyta
- Class: Jungermanniopsida
- Order: Frullaniales
- Family: Frullaniaceae
- Genus: Frullania
- Species: F. hodgsoniae

Binomial name
- Frullania hodgsoniae von Konrat, Braggins, Hentschel & Heinrichs, 2010

Synonyms
- Frullania aterrima var. lepida E.A.Hodgs., 1949; Frullania aterrima var. rostrata S.Hatt, 1983; Frullania subrostrata S.Hatt, 1972; Neohattoria rostrata R.M.Schust, 1970; Schusterella rostrata S.Hatt., Sharp & Mizut., 1972

Species of liverwort in New Zealand

Frullania hodgsoniae is a species of liverwort in the order Porellales, native to New Zealand. The species was first described by Matt Von Konrat, Jörn Hentschel, Jochen Heinrichs, John E. Braggins and Tamás Pócs in 2010.

== Taxonomy ==
Frullania hodgsoniae was originally described as Frullania aterrima var. lepida by Amy Hodgson in 1949, and later identified as Neohattoria rostrata by Rudolf M. Schuster in 1970. By 1983 the Frullania genus had been revised by Sinske Hattori, who placed this as a subspecies of F. aterrima.

The species was reinstated as a species in 2010 due to morphological and chemical differences from other Frullania species. A new species name was chosen that referenced Amy Hodgson; her original epithet could not be used as a different Frullania lepida already existed, and because Schuster's 1970 identification of the species had been recognised as invalid in 1989, due to Schuster citing two collections as the type specimen.

== Description ==
The species is small and olive-green in colour. It can be distinguished from Frullania hattorii by projections on the underside of the leaf lobes and a 3-keeled perianth, and from Frullania aterrima due to its initial branching appendages, which have three explanate segments.

== Distribution and habitat ==
Frullania hodgsoniae appears to be endemic to New Zealand, and is found on tree trunks and twigs typically at higher elevations.
