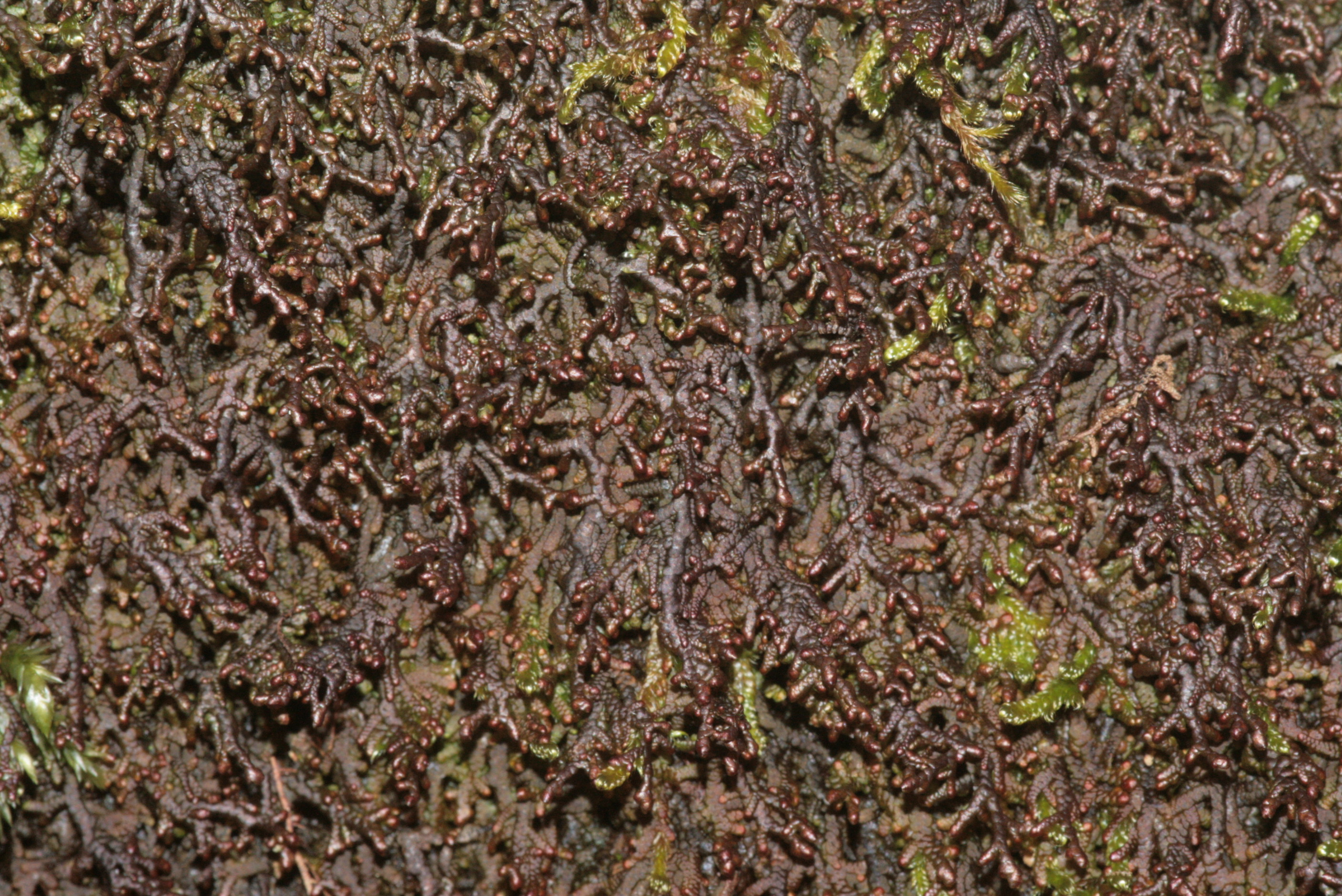

Scientific classification
- Kingdom: Plantae
- Division: Marchantiophyta
- Class: Jungermanniopsida
- Order: Frullaniales
- Family: Frullaniaceae
- Genus: Frullania
- Species: F. tamarisci

Binomial name
- Frullania tamarisci (L.) Dumort.

= Frullania tamarisci =

Species of liverwort

Frullania tamarisci is a species of liverwort belonging to the family Frullaniaceae.

It has cosmopolitan distribution.
