= Frullania intermedia =

Scientific classification
- Kingdom: Plantae
- Division: Marchantiophyta
- Class: Jungermanniopsida
- Order: Frullaniales
- Family: Frullaniaceae
- Genus: Frullania
- Species: F. intermedia

Binomial name
- Frullania intermedia (Reinw., Blume & Nees) Dumort.

Subspecies
- See text

Species of liverwort

Frullania intermedia is a liverwort species in the genus Frullania.

== Subspecies ==
- Frullania intermedia subsp. (Intermedia 1980) F. Billardieriana (Nees & Montagne In Montagne) Verdoorn, 1930
- Frullania intermedia subsp. (Intermedia 1980) var. non-Apiculata Hattori, 1975
- Frullania intermedia subsp. (Intermedia) (Reinwardt, Blume & Nees) Nees In G., L. & N., 1845
- Frullania intermedia subsp. morokensis (Stephani) Hattori, 1980
