= Philippia =

Formerly recognized genus of flowering plants

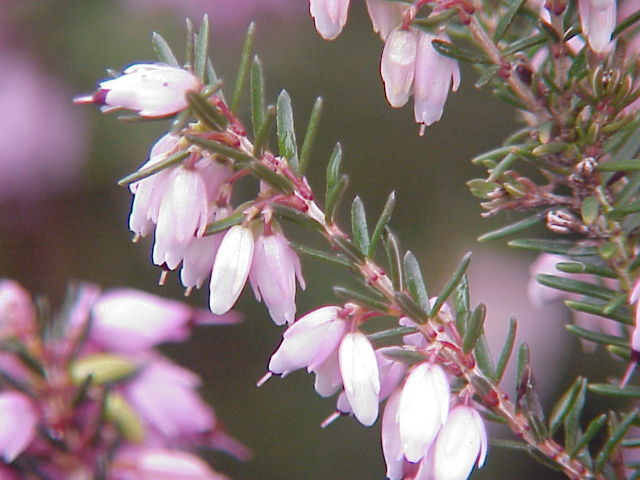
Species: Erica herbacea Family: Ericaceae

Philippia is a formerly accepted genus of plant in the family Ericaceae, now treated as a synonym of Erica. Its species ranged from southern to tropical Africa, Madagascar, and the Mascarene Islands. Philippia was a characteristic Afromontane genus in southern and eastern Africa, found in montane forests and shrublands. The genus name Philippia is in honor of Rodolfo Amando (or Rudolph Amandus) Philippi (1808–1904), who was a German–Chilean paleontologist and zoologist.
