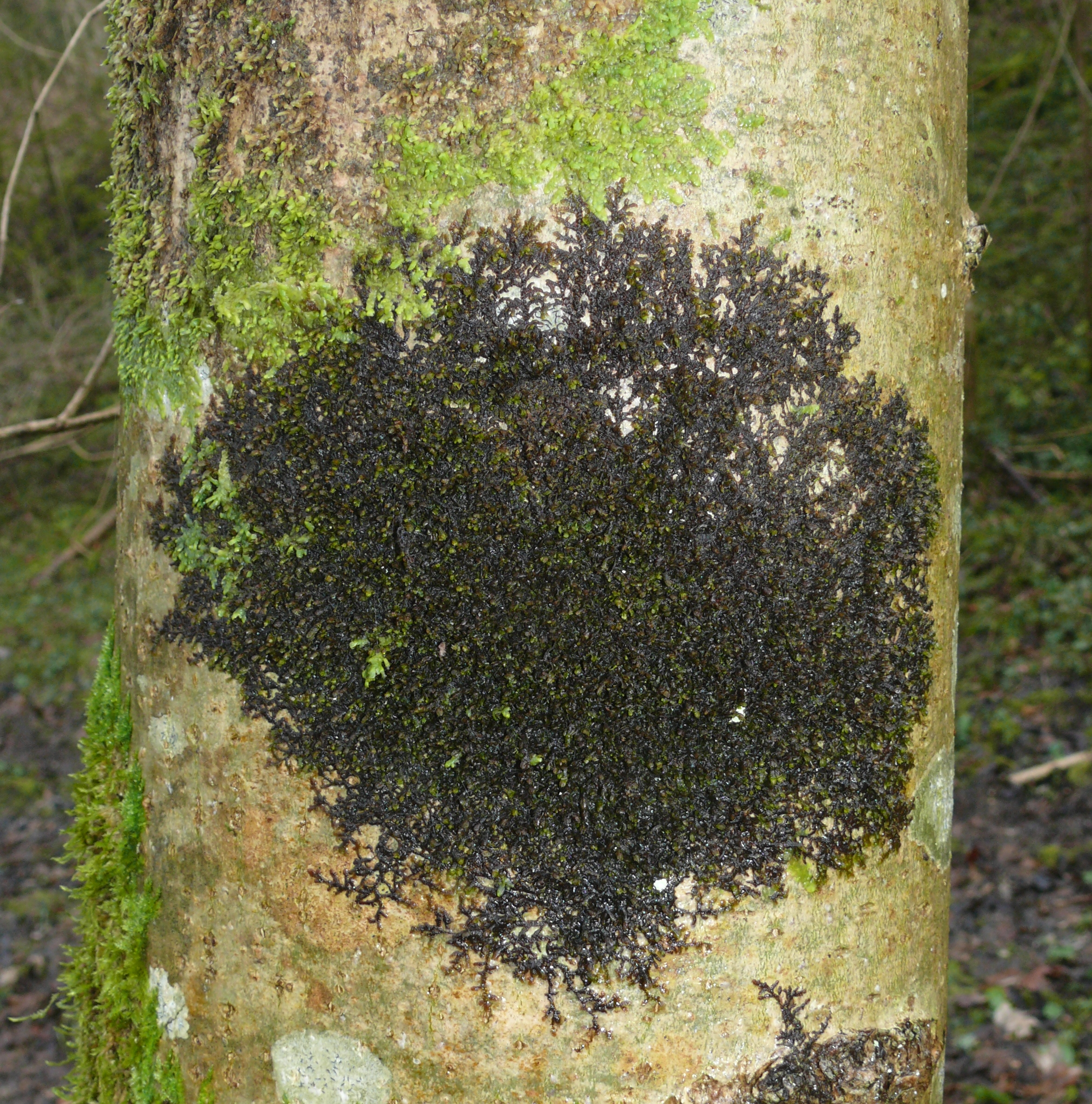
- Frullania dilatata on a tree trunk

Scientific classification
- Kingdom: Plantae
- Division: Marchantiophyta
- Class: Jungermanniopsida
- Order: Frullaniales
- Family: Frullaniaceae
- Genus: Frullania
- Species: F. dilatata

Binomial name
- Frullania dilatata (L.) Dumort.

= Frullania dilatata =

Species of liverwort

Frullania dilatata, the dilated scalewort, is a species of liverwort in the family Frullaniaceae.

It is found in Ireland, Germany, the United Kingdom.

== Subspecies ==
- Frullania dilatata subsp. (dilatata 1982) (L.) Dumortier, 1835
- Frullania dilatata subsp. (dilatata 1982) f. fuscovirens Jorgensen, 1934
- Frullania dilatata subsp. (dilatata 1982) var. anomala Corbiere, 1889
- Frullania dilatata subsp. (dilatata 1982) var. macrotus Nees, 1838
- Frullania dilatata subsp. (dilatata 1982) var. subtilissima Nees, 1838
- Frullania dilatata subsp. asiatica Hattori, 1982
